= Edinburgh Festival Fringe 1959 =

The 1959 Edinburgh Festival Fringe was the 13th edition of what would become the world's largest arts festival, the Edinburgh Festival Fringe, running from 24 August to 12 September. This year is notable for the formation of the Fringe Society, a co-operative group that organised enhanced facilities for member groups and patrons, such as a club, a centralised box office, and map of the central Edinburgh area with markers for venues.

== Festival Fringe Society ==
Companies and participants collaborated together to create a Fringe Society for the first time, to provide a variety of facilities for member groups and patrons. The pamphlet includes details of a club, an information bureau, a centralised box office, full information about presentations of member groups, and a map of the central Edinburgh area. The Fringe Society was optional to join for member groups, as it operated as a cooperative to represent communal wants rather than controlling the festival.

== Programme ==
An overview of all three weeks of the 1959 ‘What’s On’ Festival ‘Fringe’ programme.

=== Drama ===
- Regent Hall, Abbeymount: The Oresteia by Aeschylus. Presented by Cardiff University players.
- Edinburgh Academy, Henderson Row: Shakespeare’s Macbeth. Presented by Elizabethan Theatre Group.
- Moray House Theatre, St. John’s Land: Summertime - Ugo Betti’s Idyll in Three Acts. Presented by The Pedagogues.
- Cathedral Hall, Albany Street: The Burdies - a translation into Scots by Douglas Young of Aristophanes’ Lyrical Comedy The Birds. Presented by The Reid Gouns.
- Adam House, Chambers Street: The Firstborn by Christopher Fry. Presented by Edinburgh University Dramatic Society.
- Y.M.C.A Theatre, South St. Andrew Street: Mr. Bolfry by James Bridie. Presented by Edinburgh People’s Theatre.
- Cranston Street Hall, Canongate: Why the Chicken by John McGrath. Presented by Oxford Theatre Group.
- Epworth Hall, Nicolson Square: Salome by Oscar Wilde and The Beauty from Samos by Mernander. Presented by Sheffield University Union.
- Y.M.C.A Theatre, South St. Andrew Street: Subject to Love - a dramatisation of stories by Checkhov, Dickens, Henry James, Mansfield, Maupassant and Schnitzler. Presented by Rosalinde Fuller.
- Little Theatre, The Pleasance: Graham Came by Cleish by James L. Dow. Presented by the Scottish Community Drama Association.

=== Puppetry ===
- Scottish Tourist Board Hall, Rutland Place: Duncan and Macduff and Windows of Heaven by Morna Gillespie. Presented by Pan Puppets.
- Puppet Theatre, Belgrave Mews: Jinty and the Traveller by Morna Elmhirst. Presented by The Lee Puppets.
- The Gartshore Hall: A varied programme including the Chesner Miracle Play of Abraham and Isaac, a Bas Ballad and Shakespeare’s King John as well as original material. Presented by The Barry Smith Puppets.

=== Late Night Entertainment ===
- Cranston Street Hall, Canongate: Better Never by Stanley Daniels. Presented by the Oxford Theatre Group.
- Central Hall, Tollcross: Blood Will Out by Dorothy Rose Gribble. Presented by Plantagenet Productions.
- Kintore Rooms, 74 Queen Street
- Free Gardeners’ Hall
- Central Hall, Tollcross
- Epworth Hall, Nicolson Square
- Gartshore Hall, George Street
- Gartshore Hall
- Freemason’s Hall, Boardroom
- Central Hall, Tollcross: One Woman Theatre by Elspeth Douglas Reid

=== Operetta ===
- Scottish Tourist Board Hall, Rutland Place: an Evening Concert including Up the River by Herve, and The Sleeping Queen by Balfe. Presented by The Operetta Singers.

=== Drama ===
- Canongate Kirk, The Kirk of Holyroodhouse: performances of Everyman given by students of the College of Dramatic Art, Royal Scottish Academy of Music.

=== Other Events ===
- Royal High School Hall, Regent Road: An Edinburgh Fancy. Presented by the Edinburgh Branch of the Royal Scottish Country Dance Society.
- Princess Margaret to attend Fashion Show held in the Upper Library Hall, the Old College, University of Edinburgh.
- Fashion show in Adam House, Chambers Street - a show of Ronald Paterson’s Autumn Collection of new designs to assist the funds of the Marie Curie Memorial Foundation in Scotland.
- ‘Scotland Today’ at 100 Princes Street - a series of daily lectures and film shows on various aspects of Scottish life and scenery. Presented by The Overseas League.
- French Institute, 13 Randolph Crescent
- Cathedral Church of St. Mary, Palmerston Place: Cathedral Evensong, Recital of Organ Music, Orchestral Music, and Church Music.
