= William Grant, Lord Grant =

Scottish advocate, Unionist politician and judge

The Right Honourable Lord Grant TD PC

Lord Justice Clerk
- In office 25 September 1962 – 19 November 1972
- Nominated by: himself
- Appointed by: Elizabeth II
- Preceded by: Lord Thomson
- Succeeded by: Lord Wheatley

Lord Advocate
- In office 6 April 1960 – 25 September 1962
- Nominated by: Harold Macmillan
- Appointed by: Elizabeth II
- Preceded by: William Rankine Milligan
- Succeeded by: Ian Shearer

Member of Parliament for Glasgow Woodside
- In office 26 May 1955 – 25 September 1962
- Preceded by: William Gordon Bennett
- Succeeded by: Neil Carmichael

Solicitor General for Scotland
- In office 13 January 1955 – 6 April 1960
- Nominated by: Winston Churchill
- Appointed by: Elizabeth II
- Preceded by: William Rankine Milligan
- Succeeded by: David Anderson

Personal details
- Born: 19 June 1909 Dufftown, Moray, Scotland
- Died: 19 November 1972 (aged 63) – Lynchat, Scottish Highlands
- Party: Unionist
- Spouse: Margaret Milne
- Children: 3
- Education: University of Edinburgh
- Profession: Advocate

William Grant, Lord Grant, TD, PC (19 June 1909 – 19 November 1972) was a Scottish advocate, a Unionist politician, and a judge. Born to the Grant's distillery family who created Glenfiddich whisky, he was one of Scotland's Great Officers of State for the last 12 years of his life.

A classical scholar and talented orator who nonetheless lost his first two election campaigns, Grant sat in the House of Commons from 1955 to 1962. Throughout that period he was a Law Officer: first Solicitor General for Scotland, then Lord Advocate.

He left Parliament in 1962 to become Lord Justice Clerk, the second most senior judge in Scotland. His work included chairing the eponymous Grant Committee, a major inquiry into the working of Scotland's sheriff courts.

While still in office, Grant died in a traffic collision in the Scottish Highlands; the crash left two other men dead and a young family seriously injured. Grant had been drink driving.

== Early life and family ==
Grant was born on 19 June 1909 in Dufftown, Banff, the son of Edward Grant. His mother was a former Miss Kennedy, who Edward had married in 1908. His grandfather William Grant (1839–1923) was the founder of the distillers William Grant & Sons, producers of Glenfiddich whisky.

Edward had been a solicitor for the Caledonian Railway in Glasgow, before returning to Dufftown to work for the family's Balvenie distillery. He died in September 1911, aged 34, when William was two years old.

Janet Roberts, a granddaughter of the distillery founder and therefore presumably Grant's first cousin, was Scotland's oldest person when she died in 2012 aged 110.

== Education and Second World War ==
Schooled at Fettes College in Edinburgh, Grant won a scholarship in classics to Oriel College, Oxford, where he graduated with a first-class degree. He then studied law at the University of Edinburgh, graduating with an LLB with distinction.

He was admitted as an advocate on 2 November 1934. As an officer of the Territorial Army, he was mobilised at the outset of World War II, and served in the Royal Artillery, reaching the rank of major. In 1943 or 1944 he became Deputy Assistant Adjutant General at the War Office.

== Career ==
Returning to the bar after demobilisation in 1945, Grant rebuilt his legal practice, focusing on trusts, wills, inheritance and company law. In 1949 he became standing junior counsel to the Ministry of Pensions in Scotland. With a reputation for fast work and effective presentation, he took silk in 1951.

He lectured in law at the University of Edinburgh and from 1950 to 1954 he chaired the National Health Service Tribunal for Scotland. In the same period, he was also a senior advocate depute.

=== Politics and law officer ===
In the early 1950s, Grant was twice an unsuccessful parliamentary candidate for the Labour-held constituency of Edinburgh East. At the 1951 general election, aided by the lack of a Liberal Party candidate, he reduced the majority of the sitting Member of Parliament (MP) and current Lord Advocate, John Wheatley, by nearly half. However at the by-election in April 1954 after Wheatley became a judge, Labour increased its majority to over 5,000, reversing a swing to the government in the previous six by-elections that year.

Still without a parliamentary seat, Grant was appointed in January 1955 as Solicitor General for Scotland. He succeeded William Rankine Milligan who had been promoted to Lord Advocate to replace James Latham Clyde, who had been raised to the bench as a Senator of the College of Justice in the place of Lord Cooper.

He took office as Milligan's deputy in the last months of Winston Churchill's premiership. Grant was later selected as the Unionists' prospective parliamentary candidate for the Unionist-held seat of Glasgow Woodside. At the general election in May 1955, Grant's oratory drew over a thousand people to his eve-of-poll rally on 25 May in Hillhead, with hundreds more turned away. Two girls fainted in the excitement, which the Glasgow Herald newspaper suggested set "a minor record for 1955 political meetings". He held the seat for the Unionists, with an increased majority, assisted by favourable boundary changes.

Grant and Milligan were retained in office both in the 1955–57 government of Churchill's successor, Anthony Eden, and in the post-1957 government of Harold Macmillan. Grant became a privy counsellor in the Queens's 1958 Birthday Honours.

At the general election in October 1959, Grant was re-elected in Glasgow Woodside. When Milligan was appointed as a judge in 1960, Grant was promoted to fill the vacancy as Lord Advocate.

=== Lord Advocate ===
His successor as Solicitor General, David Anderson, was not an MP. This left Grant as the government's only spokesperson in the Commons on Scottish legal matters.

As Lord Advocate, Grant held ultimate authority to decide whether any prosecution should proceed. One of the cases which he declined to bring was a charge of obscenity against the publishers of Lady Chatterley's Lover, following the unsuccessful prosecution in England. In November 1960, Grant announced in the Commons that the book was "tedious" and that he would not prosecute. The Labour MP Emrys Hughes congratulated Grant for his "extreme common sense", and a subsequent High Court challenge to his decision failed.

However, Grant was no liberal. In Winnipeg in 1961, he opposed recent British moves to restrict capital punishment, describing them as mistaken and a threat to public safety.

In 1962, Grant led the defence in the Scottish courts of a claim for about £60 million (£1.12 billion in 2025) in damages by the Glasgow-based Burmah Oil Company against the government of the United Kingdom. During the Japanese conquest of Burma in 1941 and 1942, the company's assets in Rangoon had been destroyed under a "scorched earth" policy by retreating British forces. Having been advised in the late 1940s to sue the government of Burma, the company's company's 12 years of litigation had failed to establish liability against Burma. The trial judge, Lord Kilbrandon, ruled in favour of the oil company. His judgment was overturned by the First Division of the Inner House of the Court of Session, which was in turn overruled by the law lords in Burmah Oil Co Ltd v Lord Advocate. Burmah Oil's legal victory was retrospectively nullified by the War Damage Act 1965.

=== Lord Justice Clerk ===
Following the death in April 1962 of the Lord Justice Clerk, George Thomson, it was expected that the government would follow the usual practice of appointing the Lord Advocate to the judicial vacancy. The decision was in fact usually made by the Lord Advocate, who traditionally appointed himself, with a substantial rise in salary. (In 1967, then Lord Advocate Gordon Stott was elevated to the judiciary, and later joked "I appointed myself, and a jolly good judge I turned out to be").

However, after the office had been vacant for more than three months, the Labour MP James Hoy raised the issue at Prime Minister's Questions on 31 July, suggesting that the delay was due to government fears of losing a by-election. (At the 1959 election, Grant had a majority of only 2,084 in his Woodside constituency, down from 4,303 in 1955. Woodside was by then considered a marginal seat.).

Prime Minister Harold Macmillan declined a challenge from opposition leader Hugh Gaitskell to explain the reasons for the delay, but promised that a new Justice Clerk would be in place before the Scottish courts resumed on 2 October. On 25 September, a week before the courts opened, Grant was raised to the bench with the judicial title Lord Grant. The Glasgow Woodside by-election was held on 22 November. As expected, it was won by the Labour candidate Neil Carmichael.

As a judge, Grant gravitated towards criminal cases. He also undertook a lot of the court's administrative duties.

==== Grant Committee ====
In 1963, the Secretary of State for Scotland Michael Noble appointed Grant as chairman of a committee of inquiry into Scotland's sheriff courts. The committee included David Brand QC, several solicitors, and others.

The Committee on the Sheriff Court, known as the Grant Committee, reported in July 1967, recommending a major reorganisation of the courts to end the long delays in criminal cases. Its recommendations included an increase in the number of full-time sheriffs, the abolition of juries in civil cases in the sheriff courts, increasing the maximum sentence imposed by sheriffs from two years to three, and broadening the recruitment base for sheriffs to include solicitors and academic lawyers.

The report led to the Sheriff Courts (Scotland) Act 1971.

=== Other interests ===
Grant was the first chairman of the Edinburgh Festival Fringe Society as well as a director of Scottish Opera.

== Personal life ==
In 1934, Grant became engaged to Margaret Katharine Milne, a native of Aberdeen. They married in 1936, and lived in Moray Place in the New Town of Edinburgh.

The couple had two sons and a daughter, and a reputation for generous hospitality.

== Death ==
Lord Grant died on 19 November 1972 as a result of a road accident near Lynchat, about 3 miles north of Kingussie in Inverness-shire. He was 63 years old.

Driving home alone from Brora in Sutherland, his BMW had overtaken a car transporter on a double bend, and collided with a car traveling in the opposite direction, carrying a young family home to Alness. The crash killed the driver of the other car, and seriously injured his wife and their three children, aged between three and seven years. All four survivors were taken to hospital in Inverness. A male passenger in their car was killed along with the driver.

The fatal accident inquiry in May 1973 heard that blood tests showed Lord Grant to have recently consumed the "equivalent [of] two pints of beer or two large whiskies". (Note: Approximately 50 ml (40 g) of ethanol.) No alcohol was found in the blood of the other driver.

The injured widow testified that her husband had been driving at less than 25 miles per hour (40 km/h). The Inverness Constabulary estimated the impact speed to have been between 100 miles per hour (160 km/h) and 140 miles per hour (230 km/h).

== Works ==
- The Sheriff Court: Report by the Committee appointed by the Secretary of State (Cmnd.3248). Edinburgh: H.M.S.O. 1967.

== Notes ==
Parliament of the United Kingdom
| Preceded by William Gordon Bennett | Member of Parliament for Glasgow Woodside; 1955–1962 | Succeeded by Neil Carmichael |
Legal offices
| Preceded by William Rankine Milligan | Solicitor General for Scotland; 1954–1960 | Succeeded by David Anderson |
| Preceded by William Rankine Milligan | Lord Advocate; 1960–1962 | Succeeded by Ian Shearer |
| Preceded by Lord Thomson | Lord Justice Clerk; 1962–1972 | Succeeded by Lord Wheatley |
