= 1982 Glasgow Hillhead by-election =

UK parliamentary by-election

- 25 March 1982

Glasgow Hillhead parliamentary seat
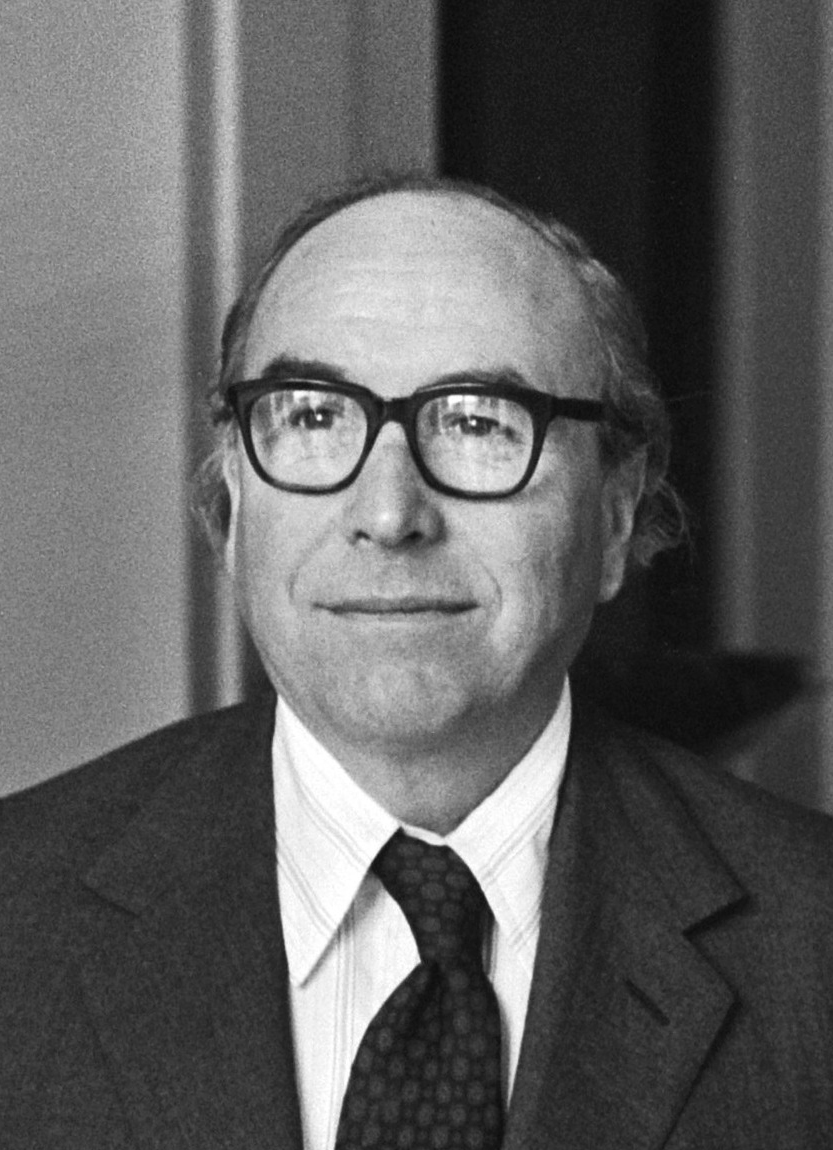

| | First party | Second party |
|---|---|---|
| Candidate | Roy Jenkins | Gerry Malone |
| Party | SDP | Conservative |
| Popular vote | 10,106 | 8,068 |
| Percentage | 33.4% | 26.6% |
| Swing | New party | ▼14.4% |
| | Third party | Fourth party |
| Candidate | David Wiseman | George Leslie |
| Party | Labour | SNP |
| Popular vote | 7,846 | 3,416 |
| Percentage | 25.9% | 11.3% |
| Swing | ▼8.5% | ▲1.2% |
MP before election
Tam Galbraith
Conservative
Subsequent MP
Roy Jenkins
SDP

The 1982 Glasgow Hillhead by-election was held on 25 March 1982. The by-election was caused by the death of the Conservative Party Member of Parliament for Glasgow Hillhead Tam Galbraith on 2 January 1982.

Hillhead had been held by the Conservatives at every election since its creation in 1918. Galbraith, who was Scotland's longest serving MP at the time of his death, himself had first won the seat since at a 1948 by-election and had been elected as its representative on further nine occasions. However, his majority had been gradually reduced, and even in the 1979 election which the Conservatives won, the Labour Party had continued to gain ground.

== Candidates ==
The Labour Party had suffered a split in 1981, with the Social Democratic Party (SDP) formed by the "Gang of Four" prominent figures: David Owen, Bill Rodgers, Shirley Williams and Roy Jenkins. The SDP had several Parliamentary seats held by defectors from Labour, and one by a defector from the Conservatives, while Williams had won the 1981 Crosby by-election for the party, leaving Jenkins as the final "Gang of Four" member without a seat in the House of Commons. He contested the 1981 Warrington by-election, coming a close second, and remained keen to fight a winnable seat. Within days of Galbraith's death, Denis Sullivan, the chairman of the SDP in Scotland, indicated that the majority of the party in Scotland wished Jenkins to be their candidate at the by-election.

In early January 1982, The Evening Times speculated that the Conservatives may try to force an early contest. A poll before 15 February would use an old electoral register, and would potentially allow the Conservatives to capitalise on divisions within the Alliance as to which of its two constitute parties would run a candidate.

Labour's candidate for the seat in 1979, Richard Mowbray, had defected to the SDP. Coupled with a largely middle class electorate and a third place in 1979 for the Liberal Party, who had since agreed an electoral pact - termed the 'Alliance' - with the SDP, the party considered Hillhead to be a target seat. Sullivan stated that, while they regretted the death of Galbraith, the SDP welcomed the chance of giving Scots the opportunity to show support for the Alliance and indicated he thought the SDP could do well, comparing the situation to the previous year's Croydon North West by-election won by the Alliance. That contest had seen the Liberal Bill Pitt record the first by-election win for the Alliance in a seat where the Liberal's had finished in clear third place in 1979. The victorious Pitt had said that that result showed that there were "no longer any safe seats for Tory or Labour in the country." Liberal leader David Steel had declared his belief that the Alliance was "now unstoppable" following the Croydon result, but at the same time an opinion poll had suggested the Alliance was only polling 16% of the vote in Scotland, while Labour was on 52%.

Jenkins was so unfamiliar with Glasgow as a parachute candidate, he later wrote, that on arrival its skyline was "as mysterious to me as the minarets of Constantinople" to Russian troops during the Russo-Turkish War. His candidacy was not immediately assured; the Hillhead Liberal association had already selected a candidate, Chic Brodie, and had been actively campaigning in the constituency since the last election. Brodie had previously been in dispute with the SDP when he refused to withdraw as a council candidate in an election to Kyle and Carrick District Council. He initially criticised the fact that the SDP and Liberals were 'haggling only hours' after Galbraith had died, but did say he would act in the best interests of the Alliance. The issue was further complicated by the fact that it was reported that some Liberals wanted to use the situation to force the SDP to let their candidate, Alan Blair, contest Greenock at the next election instead of Dickson Mabon, the sitting MP who had defected from Labour to the SDP.

Although the Hillhead SDP declared on 5 January that they wanted Jenkins as their candidate, he was reported to be nervous about contesting a seat "a long way from his usual stomping grounds". The following day, an opinion poll by National Opinion Polls suggested that if Jenkins stood he would get 33% of the vote to Labour's 31% and the Conservatives' 22%, and thus win a narrow victory. However the same poll indicated that if an alternate Alliance candidate stood, Labour would win the seat. It was reported on 6 January that the 35 members of the north area executive of the SDP in Glasgow had unanimously backed Jenkins to stand as the Alliance candidate in the by-election and had informed the Liberals of their view. The north area SDP executive's chairman Ian McDonald stated that it was up to the Liberals to respond, but the executive anticipated "that they will agree with our decisions" and that they would have a "joint candidate". However the general secretary of the Liberal Party in Scotland was tight lipped about any agreement saying that his party felt it was "improper to get involved in speculation about plans for a by-election before Sir Thomas Galbraith has had a decent burial", adding that the party would meet to consider the matter on Friday 8 January and hoped to speak to the SDP on the same day.

While David Steel was reported to be prepared to back Jenkins if he wanted to stand for the SDP, he also believed that if Brodie stood, he had a good chance of winning. It was only after a "tense and uncomfortable" discussion at Jenkins' house, involving various Liberal and SDP figures, that a resolution was agreed which safeguarded the nomination of Jenkins as the Alliance candidate.

The Conservatives hoped to hold the seat, but were behind in the polls. Mooted candidates for the party included the early favourite, Len Turpie, a lawyer and leader of the Conservative Group on Strathclyde Regional Council. Turpie was also the husband of the chair of the local Conservative Association. Another name mentioned as potential Conservative candidate was Anna McCurley. Ultimately the Conservatives ran Gerry Malone, a local lawyer. Malone called for cuts in welfare and the reintroduction of hanging.

Labour faced a struggle to win the seat, but hoped their lead in the polls would translate to a by-election victory. They stood David Wiseman, a local councillor and community worker who had previously been known for his research into the Loch Ness Monster. He was also known as a Bennite.

The Scottish National Party (SNP) had contested the seat for many years, and in recent elections had won around 10% of the vote. They stood George Leslie, a local vet, and campaigned for Scottish independence, with a particular focus on Jenkins' background in England and Wales. The Ecology Party, then little-known, stood Nicolette Carlaw, who focused her campaign on nuclear disarmament and stated that, if she was not standing, she would call on her supporters to vote for Leslie, as he looked after her cats.

An organisation named the "Social Democratic Party", founded by Donald Kean in Manchester in 1979 and unconnected with the organisation Jenkins represented, stood Douglas Parkin. As a dummy candidate, Parkin changed his name by deed poll to "Roy Harold Jenkins" in an attempt to confuse voters who wished to vote for the better-known candidate, whose full name was "Roy Harris Jenkins".

Jack Glass, a Protestant pastor and founder of the local Zion Sovereign Grace Baptist Church, stood in opposition to a planned visit to Scotland by the Pope, whom he described as the antichrist, while veteran by-election candidate Bill Boaks stood as "Public Safety Democratic Monarchist White Resident".

== Campaign ==
Within days of Galbraith's death, The Glasgow Herald predicted that the by-election contest to succeed him would be 'one of the most fiercely contested in Scotland this century'. The campaign was lively and closely fought. Some newspapers initially thought that Jenkins was not keen to represent a Scottish constituency and would struggle to win the seat. Polls consistently showed Jenkins with a narrow lead of around 1% over Malone, leaving Wiseman in third position.

During the campaign, Wiseman stated that a vote for any candidate other than him was "a vote for the Tories and a signal of support for high unemployment, inflation and policies of 'poverty' and 'despair'". He argued that the SDP's policies were similar to those of the Conservative Wets and when asked if he was sorry that Jenkins had left Labour replied that "His views are not are not those of a Socialist party... his views and policies are those of a Tory party."

Labour sent big name politicians, including Tony Benn and party leader Michael Foot, to address large public meetings in the constituency. During the campaign, a meeting at the main hall of Victoria Park School in Scotstoun that was addressed by Benn attracted an audience of over 1500 people and two overspill halls were also packed. Foot meanwhile attracted an audience of 1000 at a meeting in Hillhead just before the poll where he mocked his former cabinet colleague Jenkins. Foot stated that while Jenkins now backed devolution he could have known him "over a long period as a strong opponent of devolution and especially a Scottish Assembly". Foot also claimed that Jenkins had been "such a poor MP" for Stetchford that Labour had lost the seat in the by-election in 1977 following Jenkins' departure from parliament.

Labour also persuaded Wiseman to remove the earring he always wore. Jenkins brought the other members of the Gang of Four to campaign, Williams describing the by-election as "the last chance for Britain to find a democratic, moderate but radical alternative to revolution." Jenkins was absent from the final weekend of campaigning, prompting questions about his health.

Malone argued that the trade union movement was to blame for "the country's economic decline" as it had evolved away from its human origins into "a political monster". He linked Jenkins to this development via his role in the Wilson Government's failure to implement the trade union reform plans advanced in the In Place of Strife white paper in 1969. Malone was supported by John Nott, Geoffrey Howe and Edward Heath, and the Conservative government announced a major investment into Glasgow's Queen's Dock. Malone later said that Jenkins' supporters used the issue of his Roman Catholic faith to dissuade the mostly Protestant voters from supporting him.

The SDP took "Roy Harold Jenkins" to court, claiming that his attempt to confuse voters constituted a corrupt practice under the Representation of the People Act. They failed to convince the court. However, the SDP was permitted to draw attention to the position of their candidate on the ballot paper, and did so in a wide variety of ways. Among these was placing volunteers near polling stations on the day of the election, wearing sandwich boards reading "The real Roy Jenkins is number 5". One of these volunteers was Charles Kennedy, who in 1999 became leader of the Liberal Democrats.

On 20 March, a new Scottish opinion poll by System Three suggested that Labour's support in Scotland was increasing, while the Conservatives and the Alliance were falling back. This was thought to be particularly unhelpful to the Conservatives, who had fallen into fourth place in Scotland, in their bid to retain Hillhead. However it was noted in The Glasgow Herald that the poll was based on research at the end of February and early March, and crucially before the budget which was thought to have increased support for the Conservative Government.

A System Three poll of voting intentions for the by-election appeared in The Glasgow Herald two days before the election and predicted that the SDP would win the contest with 31% of the vote, followed by the Conservatives on 27%, Labour on 26% and the SNP on 13%. The SDP lead in this poll was larger than other polls had suggested, but at 4% it was thought to be within the margin of error. Labour, the Conservatives and the SNP all rejected the poll's findings, with the Conservatives saying that their canvas returns "showed them to be well ahead".

However, the day before the election the Evening Times reported that a Gallup poll showed Wiseman in a winning position on a predicted vote share of 33.5%, ahead of Malone on 27% and Jenkins on 26%. This was reflected in bookmakers odds which now made Labour the favourite to win the seat. This poll, which went against the findings of the earlier polls, was rejected by David Reid, the Conservative agent who did not believe it possible Labour were so far ahead. Reid predicted that anyone of the three main candidates would win in what would be a close contest and stated he would be "a very surprised man" if the result was not so close as to produce a recount. The SDP also stated the poll was at odds with their canvassing, while the SNP claimed that their predicted 12.5% vote share was wrong and they would "do a lot better than that" in the actual vote. Wiseman's agent Jimmy Allison stated the poll was significant, but even he doubted that Labour was that far ahead.

== Result ==
The final result proved to be almost identical to the System Three opinion poll that had been carried out for The Glasgow Herald, and published on 23 March, with the SDP polling around 2% more than predicted and the SNP about 2% less than the poll suggested (with the figures for the Conservatives and Labour being almost exactly as the poll suggested). Jenkins won with just over one third of the votes cast. Malone took second place, just ahead of Wiseman, the share of the vote for both parties falling, while Leslie slightly increased the SNP share, but fell short of the 12.5% threshold in order to retain his deposit. The other candidates won less than a thousand votes between them, Roy Harold Jenkins' intervention not influencing the final result. Boaks took only five votes, the lowest total ever recorded for a candidate in a by-election who had not withdrawn. Such was the public attention that turnout was actually up from the general election.

An editorial in The Glasgow Herald the morning after the election praised the conduct of both voters and candidates in the contest, noting that personal insults had been "largely avoided" and "public meetings well attended" with "thoughtful" questions being asked. It claimed that "the eyes of Britain" had been on Hillhead, and that the constituency "did not let its city down."

Glasgow Hillhead by-election, 1982
| Party | Candidate | Votes | % | ±% |
|---|---|---|---|---|
| SDP | Roy Jenkins | 10,106 | 33.4 | +19.0 |
| Conservative | Gerry Malone | 8,068 | 26.6 | −14.4 |
| Labour | David Wiseman | 7,846 | 25.9 | −8.5 |
| SNP | George Leslie | 3,416 | 11.3 | +1.2 |
| Protestant Crusade against the Papal Visit | Jack Glass | 388 | 1.3 | New |
| Social Democrat (1979) | Roy Harold Jenkins | 282 | 0.9 | New |
| Ecology | Nicolette Carlaw | 178 | 0.6 | New |
| Public Safety Democratic Monarchist White Resident | Bill Boaks | 5 | 0.0 | New |
| Majority | | 2,038 | 6.8 | N/A |
| Turnout | | 30,289 | 76.4 | +4.5 |
| SDP gain from Conservative | | Swing | +23.9 | |

== Previous result ==
General election 1979: Glasgow Hillhead
| Party | Candidate | Votes | % | ±% |
|---|---|---|---|---|
| Conservative | Tam Galbraith | 12,368 | 41.0 | +3.9 |
| Labour | Richard Mowbray | 10,366 | 34.4 | +6.2 |
| Liberal | Marshall Harris | 4,349 | 14.4 | +2.5 |
| SNP | G. Borthwick | 3,050 | 10.1 | −12.8 |
| Majority | | 2,002 | 6.6 | −2.3 |
| Turnout | | 30,133 | 71.9 | −0.5 |
| Conservative hold | | Swing | -1.2 | |

== Aftermath ==
The SDP now had 29 members of parliament, and the party had won three of four by-elections since its formation one year earlier. The Glasgow Herald argued that the Conservatives, despite losing the seat, would be able to claim that they had done well to finish second, while stating that the result "humiliates" Labour leader Michael Foot. The newspaper also predicted that the result threatened the Conservatives' hold on the vacant seat of Beaconsfield, where a by-election was pending. The Herald also stated that while the SNP had hoped the result would "put them back on the political map", its candidate had lost his deposit while the SDP had potentially become Scotland's third party.

Jenkins denied that the result was due to his personality and predicted it would see "a very strong revival in support for the SDP-Liberal alliance". He expressed surprise that Labour finished third, while Wiseman claimed that while he had not expected to win he had expected to come second. Cecil Parkinson, the Chairman of the Conservative Party, admitted the result was "a blow", but argued it also showed that voters were beginning to switch their support back to the Government. Foot was disappointed with the result, but noted that the SDP-Alliance had taken more support from the Conservatives than his party. He admitted that Labour's internal division was a cause of the party finishing in third place. Some anti-Bennite Labour backbenchers were secretly happy for the poor result, as it would help defeat the Bennites.

Jenkins received "a hero's reception" when he joined David Steel at the Scottish Liberal Party's conference at St Andrews the day after his victory, with delegates standing on chairs to acclaim him. Both argued that the Alliance now needed to take the votes of the SNP, with Steel calling on SNP supporters disillusioned with that party to back the Alliance to achieve Scottish home rule. Jenkins indicated that he thought the Alliance could form a government after the next election, but appealed to the Liberal delegates to show unity in the issue of deciding which party should fight which constituency. The same day Jenkins told a celebration dinner in Edinburgh "that the SDP had a great opportunity to become the majority party".

Having already agreed to serve under Jenkins in the Alliance, Steel urged the SDP to quickly choose a leader. Now in Parliament, Jenkins contested the SDP leadership election in July, winning narrowly. Following a disappointing result for the party in the 1983 general election, in which Jenkins retained the seat, he resigned the post. The 1983 contest saw the seat fought on new boundaries. According to notional results produced by the BBC and ITN, had these boundaries been in use in 1979 the seat would have returned a Labour candidate by a majority of just over 2,000 votes rather than result in a Conservative victory. Jenkins was challenged by Neil Carmichael, the sitting Labour MP for the abolished Glasgow Kelvingrove constituency and a former ministerial colleague of Jenkins.

Jenkins lost Hillhead at the 1987 general election to Labour's George Galloway on a 5.3% swing.

Malone won the Aberdeen South seat in 1983, and later sat for Winchester. Labour largely blamed their poor result on infighting within the party, and in particular its far-left members. Leslie stood again for the SNP in Hillhead in 1983 but saw his vote halve.

Despite the success of the Alliance in Hillhead, the next Scottish by-election, that at Coatbridge and Airdrie in June, saw their candidate, a Liberal, finish in last place and lose their deposit. The Glasgow Herald described that result as "a disastrous blow" for the Alliance and predicted it showed that the Liberals and SDP faced "an uphill struggle" in Scotland.
