= British Oxygen v Minister of Technology =

British Oxygen Co Ltd v Minister of Technology
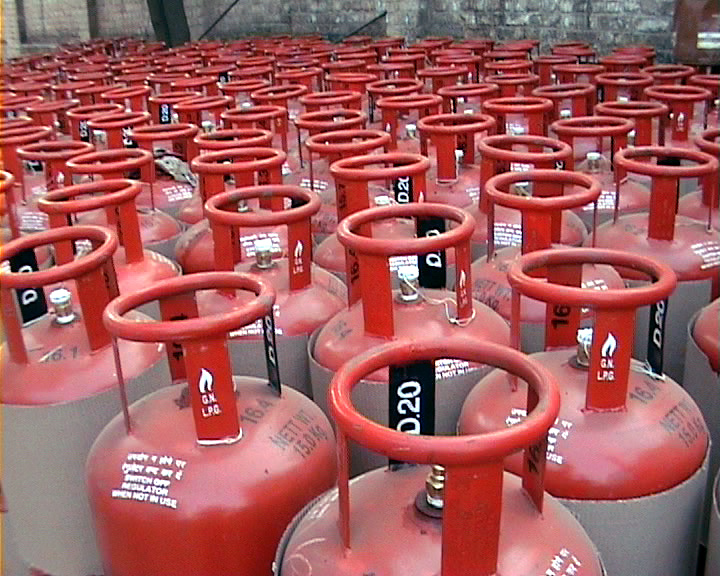
- Court: House of Lords
- Citations: [1970] UKHL 4, [1971] AC 610

Keywords
- Judicial review

British Oxygen Co Ltd v Minister of Technology [1970] UKHL 4 is a UK constitutional law case, concerning judicial review.

== Facts ==
British Oxygen claimed that it should be given grants by the Board of Trade for £4m it spent on gas cylinders costing £20 each, in its atmospheric gas and hydrogen manufacturing business. The Board had a discretionary power to give grants to help firms with capital expenditure under the Industrial Development Act 1966 s 13(1). Its policy was not to give grants for items under £25. British Oxygen Co. Ltd. argued that its application was turned down without properly considering its merits.

== Judgment ==
The House of Lords accepted that the department was entitled to make a rule or policy, if it was prepared to listen to arguments for the exercise of individual discretion. On the facts, it was entitled to refuse the application.

Lord Reid said the following:

There may be cases where an officer or authority ought to listen to a substantial argument reasonably presented urging a change of policy. What the authority must not do is to refuse to listen at all. But a Ministry or large authority may have had to deal already with a multitude of similar applications and then they will almost certainly have evolved a policy so precise that it could well be called a rule. There can be no objection to that, provided the authority is always willing to listen to anyone with something new to say...

Lord Dilhorne said the right might be described as one to ask that the policy is changed.

Lord Morris, Lord Wilberforce, and Lord Diplock agreed.

== See also ==
- United Kingdom constitutional law
