= Donald Macaulay, Baron Macaulay of Bragar =

British politician (1933–2014)

The Right Honourable The Lord Macaulay of Bragar QC
- The Lord Macaulay of Bragar

Member of the House of Lords
- Lord Temporal
- Life peerage 9 January 1989 – 12 June 2014

Personal details
- Born: 14 November 1933
- Died: 12 June 2014 (aged 80)

Donald Macaulay, Baron Macaulay of Bragar, QC (14 November 1933 – 12 June 2014) was a British Labour politician and member of the House of Lords.

He was educated at Clydebank High School and Glasgow University, where he read law. He became an advocate at the Scottish Bar in 1963 and a Queen's Counsel in 1975.

He contested Inverness at the 1970 general election. He served on the Bryden Committee on the visual identification of suspects following the Devlin Report of 1976.

He was created a life peer as Baron Macaulay of Bragar, of Bragar in the County of Ross and Cromarty on 9 January 1989. He served as Opposition spokesman for Scottish Legal Affairs in the 1990s.

Lord Macaulay died on 12 June 2014.
