= Glasgow Woodside =

Parliamentary constituency in the United Kingdom, 1950–1974

- Former burgh constituency for the House of Commons
- Subdivisions of Scotland: County of city of Glasgow

1950–1974
- Seats: One
- Created from: Glasgow St Rollox, Glasgow Maryhill and Glasgow Hillhead
- Replaced by: Glasgow Hillhead; Glasgow Maryhill

Glasgow Woodside was a parliamentary constituency of the House of Commons of the Parliament of the United Kingdom from 1950 until 1974.

The constituency was preceded by the Labour held St Rollox, which was composed of the Glasgow City Council wards of Cowcaddens and Woodside. The seat was extended to include North Kelvin Ward, which had been part of Glasgow Maryhill. The name was changed to reflect the new central area of the constituency, which was Woodside.

On the new boundaries, and following a national swing, Glasgow Woodside was narrowly gained by the Conservatives in 1950.

In 1955, Cowcaddens Ward was moved to Glasgow Central while Partick East Ward was gained from Glasgow Hillhead, culminating in an increased Conservative majority of over 4000 in that year.

Despite a national swing to the Tories in the 1959 general election, there was a swing to Labour in Scotland, and four Conservative held seats fell to Labour (Ayrshire Central, Glasgow Craigton, Glasgow Scotstoun and Lanark). The pro-Labour swing saw the Conservative majority in Glasgow Woodside cut in half.

In a 1962 by election, Glasgow Woodside fell to Labour (seeing the return of Neil Carmichael), and was retained by Labour in 1964 and 1966.

Despite winning 7 of the 9 council seats in the constituency, the Conservatives narrowly failed to regain the seat in 1970.

In February 1974, Glasgow Woodside was abolished in name. In fact post Feb 1974 Glasgow Kelvingrove became a combination of 100% of Glasgow Woodside and part of the old Glasgow Kelvingrove (the rest of which was absorbed by Glasgow Central). The Woodside MP Neil Carmichael became the MP for the new Kelvingrove, while the old Kelvingrove MP (Maurice Miller) stood in the new East Kilbride seat which had been formed from much of Lanark.

In 1983, Glasgow Kelvingrove was more or less equally divided between Glasgow Hillhead and Glasgow Maryhill. Neil Carmichael stood and lost against the SDP MP for Hillhead, Roy Jenkins.

== Boundaries ==
1950–1955: The North Kelvin and Woodside wards of the county of the city of Glasgow, and the part of the Partick (East) ward which is not included in the Hillhead constituency.

1955–1974: The North Kelvin, Partick East and Woodside wards of the county of the city of Glasgow.

== Members of Parliament ==
Election	Member	Party
1950	William Gordon Bennett	Unionist
1955	William Grant	Unionist
1962 by-election	Neil George Carmichael, later Baron Carmichael of Kelvingrove	Labour
1974 (Feb)	constituency abolished	

== Election results ==
=== Elections in the 1950s ===
General election 1950: Glasgow Woodside
Party	Candidate	Votes	%	±%
Unionist	William Gordon Bennett	17,075	48.7	
Labour Co-op	William Leonard	15,966	45.6	
Liberal	Thomas Ledbetter Woodside	2,005	5.7	
Majority		1,109	3.1	
Turnout		35,046		
Unionist win (new seat)				

General election 1951: Glasgow Woodside
Party	Candidate	Votes	%	±%
Unionist	William Gordon Bennett	18,533	53.4	+4.7
Labour Co-op	Richard McCutcheon	16,210	46.6	+1.0
Majority		2,343	6.8	+3.7
Turnout		34,743		
Unionist hold		Swing		

General election 1955: Glasgow Woodside
Party	Candidate	Votes	%	±%
Unionist	William Grant	19,846	56.1	+2.7
Labour	John McGinley	15,543	43.9	−2.7
Majority		4,303	12.2	+5.4
Turnout		35,389		
Unionist hold		Swing		

General election 1959: Glasgow Woodside
Party	Candidate	Votes	%	±%
Unionist	William Grant	16,567	49.3	−6.8
Labour	John McGinley	14,483	43.1	−0.8
Liberal	George Vincent McLaughlin (solicitor)	2,583	7.7	New
Majority		2,084	6.2	−6.0
Turnout		33,633		
Unionist hold		Swing		

=== Elections in the 1960s ===
1962 Glasgow Woodside by-election
Party	Candidate	Votes	%	±%
Labour	Neil George Carmichael	8,303	36.1	−7.0
Unionist	Norman Macleod Glen	6,936	30.1	−19.2
Liberal	Jack House	5,000	21.7	+14.0
SNP	A. Niven	2,562	11.1	New
Ind. Socialist	Guy Alfred Aldred	134	0.6	New
Socialist (GB)	Robert Vallar	83	0.4	New
Majority		1,368	6.0	N/A
Turnout		23,018		
Labour gain from Unionist		Swing		

General election 1964: Glasgow Woodside
Party	Candidate	Votes	%	±%
Labour	Neil George Carmichael	15,521	49.1	+13.0
Unionist	Norman Macleod Glen	11,954	37.8	+7.7
Liberal	Jack House	2,443	7.7	−14.0
SNP	David J. Stevenson	1,600	5.1	−6.0
Socialist (GB)	Robert Vallar	88	0.3	−0.1
Majority		3,567	11.3	+5.3
Turnout		31,606		
Labour gain from Unionist		Swing		

General election 1966: Glasgow Woodside
Party	Candidate	Votes	%	±%
Labour	Neil George Carmichael	13,540	50.6	+1.5
Conservative	Norman Macleod Glen	11,202	41.8	+4.0
SNP	Robert Fairlie	1,916	7.1	+2.0
Socialist (GB)	Robert Vallar	122	0.5	+0.2
Majority		2,338	8.8	−2.5
Turnout		26,780		
Labour hold		Swing		

=== Election in the 1970s ===
General election 1970: Glasgow Woodside
Party	Candidate	Votes	%	±%
Labour	Neil George Carmichael	10,785	47.4	−3.2
Conservative	Victor J MacColl	9,457	41.5	−0.3
SNP	David Rollo	1,912	8.4	+1.3
Ind. Conservative	G Ross MacKay	614	2.7	New
Majority		1,328	5.8	−3.0
Turnout		22,768		
Labour hold		Swing		
