= Neil Carmichael =

Neil Carmichael may refer to:

- Neil Carmichael, Baron Carmichael of Kelvingrove (1921–2001), British Labour Party politician, Member of Parliament (MP) in Glasgow 1962–1983
- Neil Carmichael (English politician) (born 1961), English businessman, academic, and MP for Stroud from 2010
