= Roughead =

Roughead is an English surname. Notable people with the surname include:

- Gary Roughead (b. 1951), a United States naval officer and Chief of Naval Operations
- Jarryd Roughead (b. 1987), an Australian rules football player
- Jordan Roughead (b. 1990), an Australian rules football player
- William Roughead (1870–1952), a Scottish lawyer and writer
