= 1962 Glasgow Woodside by-election =

1962 UK parliamentary by-election

The 1962 Glasgow Woodside by-election was held on 22 November 1962 when the incumbent Unionist MP, William Grant was appointed as Lord Justice Clerk. It was won by the Labour candidate Neil Carmichael, who retained the gain in the subsequent General Election.

== Campaign ==
The Glasgow Herald reported on the morning of the poll that the Unionist candidate Norman Glen thought he would poll around 40% of the poll, with Carmichael polling about 39% for Labour. Carmichael predicted he would win by about 2,000 votes, while the Liberal candidate Jack House predicted that the seat would be won by either Carmichael or himself with Glen coming third. However the newspaper also reported that opinion polling suggested a comfortable win for Labour.

== Result ==
Glasgow Woodside by-election, 1962
Party	Candidate	Votes	%	±%
Labour	Neil Carmichael	8,303	36.1	−7.0
Unionist	Norman Macleod Glen	6,936	30.1	−19.2
Liberal	Jack House	5,000	21.7	+14.0
SNP	A. Niven	2,562	11.1	New
Independent Socialist	Guy Aldred	134	0.6	New
Socialist (GB)	Robert Vallar	83	0.4	New
Majority		1,368	6.0	N/A
Turnout		23,018		
Labour gain from Conservative		Swing		
