= John Gray Wilson =

John Gray Wilson QC (10 October 1915 – 28 September 1968) was a Scottish advocate, writer and Liberal Party politician.

== Background ==
Wilson was the son of Alexander Robertson Wilson, writer (or solicitor) and town clerk of the then Royal and Ancient Burgh of Irvine, and Elizabeth Wylie Murray. He was born in Irvine. He was named for a great-grandfather, John Gray, who was town clerk of Ayr, and joint secretary of the first Burns festival there in 1844; an uncle 'John Gray Wilson' had died at the age of 14. The John Gray Wilson of this article, the Sheriff, was educated at Irvine Royal Academy; the Edinburgh Academy, where he was Dux (leading scholar) in 1935; and, as an Open Classics Scholar, at Oriel College, Oxford where he graduated B.A. In the long vacation of 1936 he contracted polio, which left him with a weakened leg and chest, and contributed to his early death. After Oxford, he attended Edinburgh University where he received the degree of Bachelor of Laws. In 1943 he married Nan MacAuslan, herself active in the liberal Party and later awarded a PhD by the University of Edinburgh for a Thesis on the Social Anthropology of the Faculty of Advocates. They had three sons.

== Professional career ==
Wilson was an Edinburgh advocate, having been admitted to the Faculty of Advocates in 1942. In 1949 he was appointed Standing Junior Counsel to the Department of Agriculture for Scotland. He contributed to the Law Reports in The Scotsman and The Times. In 1956 he became a Scottish QC. In 1958 he became Sheriff-substitute of Renfrewshire at Paisley. In 1963 he became Sheriff-substitute of the Lothians and Peebles at Edinburgh. He maintained an interest in academic law, acting as external examiner for the Faculties of Law at Aberdeen and Edinburgh Universities, and holding a post as visiting lecturer at Witswatersrand, South Africa, in the 1950s.

== Interests ==
Wilson was a cultured man of wide interests. He belonged to The Scottish Arts Club, where he was flattered to be known as 'the Shirra' (a colloquial Scots form of 'Sheriff'), as one of his admired writers, Sir Walter Scott, Sheriff-Depute of Selkirkshire, had been before him. He was widely read in literature, both English and Scots, as well as the Classics on which he had been educated. An accomplished amateur painter in both water-colour and oils, he was on a painting holiday in Dubrovnik when he died at his easel. He was also interested in drama, taking part in various performances until late in his life, and directing several, including the domestic pantomimes he wrote for the Harpic Players (because they were 'clean round the bend'), a group of friends and neighbours.

== Publications ==
- In 1953 he published the Trial of Jeannie Donald in the "Notable British Trials" Series (William Hodge & Co.).
- In 1959 he wrote The Trial of Peter Manuel: the Man who Talked too much (Secker & Warburg), dealing with the nature of psychopathic murderers as well as the biography of the killer and the legal problems raised in the trial, which, followed by an appeal and the execution of Manuel, had taken place the previous year (1958).
- In 1960, he published Not Proven (Secker & Warburg), accounts of four trials which resulted in that verdict: those of Christina Gilmour in 1843, for the murder of her husband John, by arsenic; Madeleine Hamilton Smith, in 1857 for the murder, by arsenic, of Pierre l'Angelier in 1857; Alfred John Monson in 1893 for attempted murder and murder - "In each case the alleged victim was Windsor Dudley Cecil Hambrough. The two crimes were said to have been committed within a few hours of one another"; and John Donald Merrett in 1927, for the murder of his mother by pistol. The book is introduced by a chapter discussing the verdict, "Bastard Verdict?", using Sir Walter Scott's term of 1827.
- His magnum opus, which he did not live to finish, is The Law of husband and wife in Scotland. This was first published in 1974, in Edinburgh, by W Green and Son, 1974, under the auspices of the Scottish Universities Law Institute, having been completed after Sheriff Wilson's death by Eric M. Clive (later Professor of Scots Law in the University of Edinburgh), who writes in the Preface: "it is a work of successive rather than joint authorship. Of the book as it now [i.e. first edition] appears, Chapters 3, 4, 16-19 and 25 (as well as most of the section on Canon law in Chapter 1 and the section on evidence of adultery in Chapter 23) were written by Sheriff Wilson." This text is now in its fourth edition (1997), having passed through a second edition in 1982 and a third in 1992.
- In 2016, his son (John) Mark Wilson published a novel whose manuscript he left at his death, The Old Innocent, based on the Sandyford murder case of 1862. The novel is a first person narrative related by James Fleming, who was accused of the murder during her trial by Jessie McLachlan, who was convicted. It is clear that Sheriff Wilson thought Fleming (called 'The Old Innocent' by The Glasgow Herald, the only newspaper on his side in a cause célèbre) to be the murderer. The novel (ISBN 978-0-9956076-1-3; Berwick, fantasyPrints) is largely told in Glasgow Scots, and to an extent the character of Fleming has affinities with that of the central character of Holy Willie's Prayer, Robert Burns's biting satire on the hypocrisy he saw in the Scottish Kirk. Wilson, born in Irvine always felt kinship with Burns, who had lived there in 1781-2.

== Political career ==
Wilson was a strong supporter of a devolved Scottish Parliament and was a founding member of the Scottish Covenant Association. He was a member of the national executive of the Liberal Party. He was strongly in favour of reform of electoral procedures by the use of proportional representation. He was Liberal candidate for the Hillhead division of Glasgow at the 1945 General Election.

General Election 1945: Glasgow Hillhead
| Party | Candidate | Votes | % | ±% |
|---|---|---|---|---|
| Unionist | James Scott Cumberland Reid | 14,909 | 58.6 | |
| Labour | Hugh Turner McCalman | 8,545 | 33.6 | |
| Liberal | John Gray Wilson | 2,003 | 7.8 | |
| Majority | | 6,364 | 25.0 | |
| Turnout | | | 66.0 | |
| Unionist hold | | Swing | | |

He was Liberal candidate for the North division of Aberdeen at the 1950 General Election.

General Election 1950: Aberdeen North
| Party | Candidate | Votes | % | ±% |
|---|---|---|---|---|
| Labour | Hector Samuel Hughes | 31,594 | 60.4 | |
| Unionist | A Tennant | 15,705 | 30.0 | |
| Liberal | John Gray Wilson | 3,574 | 6.8 | |
| Communist | R Cooney | 1,391 | 2.7 | |
| Majority | | 15,889 | 30.4 | |
| Turnout | | | 82.9 | |
| Labour hold | | Swing | | |

He did not stand for parliament again. He continued to be active in the Liberal Party and in 1953 served as Chairman of the Scottish Liberal Party.
