= Glasgow Hillhead =

Parliamentary constituency in the United Kingdom, 1918–1997

- Former burgh constituency for the House of Commons
- Subdivision: City of Glasgow (1975–1996)

1918–1997
- Seats: One
- Created from: Partick
- Replaced by: Glasgow Kelvin

Glasgow Hillhead was a parliamentary constituency represented in the House of Commons of the Parliament of the United Kingdom from 1918 until 1997. It elected one Member of Parliament (MP) using the first-past-the-post voting system.

== Boundaries ==
1918–1950: "That portion of the city which is bounded by a line commencing at a point in the municipal boundary at its intersection with the centre line of the River Kelvin, thence southeastward, southward and southwestward along the centre line of the River Kelvin to the centre line of the North British Railway (Stobcross Branch), thence north-westward along the centre of the said North British Railway to its intersection with the municipal boundary, thence northeastward along the municipal boundary to the point of commencement".

1950–1955: The Kelvinside and Partick (West) wards of the county of the city of Glasgow, and part of the Partick (East) ward.

1955–1974: The Kelvinside and Partick West wards of the county of the city of Glasgow, and part of the Whiteinch ward.

1974–1983: The Glasgow wards of Kelvinside, Partick West, and Whiteinch.

1983–1997: The City of Glasgow District electoral divisions of Kelvindale/Kelvinside, Partick/Anderston, and Scotstoun/Broomhill.

== History ==
Along with Glasgow Cathcart, Hillhead was one of two safe Conservative Party seats in Glasgow for several decades. However, Labour reduced the Conservatives' majorities in both constituencies in the 1970s; Labour even won Cathcart in 1979 (making it the only seat the Conservative Party lost in its electoral victory that year), while Hillhead remained Conservative with a narrow majority. In the subsequent by-election of 1982, the Conservatives lost their last seat in Glasgow not to Labour, but to the year-old SDP, with the former Labour cabinet minister Roy Jenkins becoming the new MP for the constituency. Jenkins retained the seat for the SDP in the 1983 general election, but lost the seat to George Galloway of the Labour Party in 1987.

== Members of Parliament ==
Election	Member	Party
1918	Sir Robert Horne	Conservative
1937 by-election	James Reid	Conservative
1948 by-election	Tam Galbraith	Conservative
1982 by-election	Roy Jenkins	SDP
1987	George Galloway	Labour
1997	constituency abolished	

== Election results ==
=== Elections in the 1910s ===
General election 1918: Glasgow Hillhead
Party		Candidate	Votes	%	±%
C	Unionist	Robert Horne	12,803	75.4	
	Labour	John Izett	4,186	24.6	
Majority			8,617	50.8	
Turnout			16,989	63.4	
Registered electors			26,798		
	Unionist win (new seat)				
C indicates candidate endorsed by the coalition government.

=== Elections in the 1920s ===
General election 1922: Glasgow Hillhead
Party	Candidate	Votes	%	±%
Unionist	Robert Horne	12,272	62.7	−12.7
Liberal	Edwin James Donaldson	7,313	37.3	New
Majority		4,959	25.4	−25.4
Turnout		19,585	75.5	+12.1
Registered electors		25,951		
Unionist hold		Swing		

General election 1923: Glasgow Hillhead
Party	Candidate	Votes	%	±%
Unionist	Robert Horne	9,757	51.0	−11.7
Labour	John L. Kinloch	5,059	26.4	New
Liberal	Edwin James Donaldson	4,331	22.6	−14.7
Majority		4,698	24.6	−0.8
Turnout		19,147	73.2	−2.3
Registered electors		26,165		
Unionist hold		Swing	+1.5	

General election 1924: Glasgow Hillhead
Party	Candidate	Votes	%	±%
Unionist	Robert Horne	14,572	67.7	+16.7
Labour	John L. Kinloch	6,957	32.3	+5.9
Majority		7,615	35.4	+10.8
Turnout		36,101	78.2	+5.0
Registered electors		27,522		
Unionist hold		Swing	+5.4	

General election 1929: Glasgow Hillhead
Party	Candidate	Votes	%	±%
Unionist	Robert Horne	17,395	63.3	−4.4
Labour	William Sloan Cormack	10,065	36.7	+4.4
Majority		7,330	26.6	−8.8
Turnout		27,460	74.9	−3.3
Registered electors		36,660		
Unionist hold		Swing	−4.4	

=== Elections in the 1930s ===
General election 1931: Glasgow Hillhead
Party	Candidate	Votes	%	±%
Unionist	Robert Horne	21,279	73.84	+10.5
Labour	Charles Aloysius O'Donnell	7,539	26.16	−10.5
Majority		13,740	47.68	+21.1
Turnout		28,818	80.0	+5.1
Unionist hold		Swing		

- O'Donnell endorsed by constituency party but not by borough party

General election 1935: Glasgow Hillhead
Party	Candidate	Votes	%	±%
Unionist	Robert Horne	18,367	68.20	
Labour	James McCullock	8,566	31.80	
Majority		9,801	36.40	−11.28
Turnout		26,933	73.24	−6.8
Unionist hold		Swing		

1937 Glasgow Hillhead by-election
Party	Candidate	Votes	%	±%
Unionist	James Reid	12,539	56.52	−11.68
Labour	Gilbert McAllister	7,539	33.98	+2.18
SNP	John MacCormick	1,886	8.50	New
Independent	David J. Black	221	1.00	New
Majority		5,000	22.54	−13.85
Turnout		22,185		
Unionist hold		Swing		

=== Elections in the 1940s ===
General election 1945: Glasgow Hillhead
Party	Candidate	Votes	%	±%
Unionist	James Reid	14,909	58.6	−9.6
Labour	Hugh Turner McCalman	8,545	33.6	+1.8
Liberal	John Gray Wilson	2,003	7.8	New
Majority		6,364	25.0	−11.4
Turnout		25,457	66.0	−7.2
Unionist hold		Swing		

1948 Glasgow Hillhead by-election
Party	Candidate	Votes	%	±%
Unionist	Tam Galbraith	16,060	68.4	+9.8
Labour	Thomas Alexander MacNair	7,419	31.6	−2.0
Majority		8,641	36.8	+11.8
Turnout		23,479		
Unionist hold		Swing		

=== Elections in the 1950s ===
General election 1950: Glasgow Hillhead
Party	Candidate	Votes	%	±%
Unionist	Tam Galbraith	23,181	60.73	+2.1
Labour	George Thomson	12,920	33.85	+0.2
Liberal	Pamela Gibson	2,072	5.43	−2.4
Majority		10,261	26.88	+1.9
Turnout		38,173	82.17	+16.2
Registered electors		46,455		
Unionist hold		Swing	+0.9	

General election 1951: Glasgow Hillhead
Party	Candidate	Votes	%	±%
Unionist	Tam Galbraith	24,654	64.86	+4.13
Labour	Hyman Shapiro	13,359	35.14	+1.29
Majority		11,295	29.72	+2.84
Turnout		38,013	82.21	+0.04
Registered electors		46,238		
Unionist hold		Swing	+1.42	

General election 1955: Glasgow Hillhead
Party	Candidate	Votes	%	±%
Unionist	Tam Galbraith	20,106	67.57	+2.71
Labour	Jane B. Davidson	9,648	32.43	−2.71
Majority		10,458	35.14	+5.42
Turnout		29,754	79.92	−9.29
Registered electors		40,802		
Unionist hold		Swing	+2.71	

General election 1959: Glasgow Hillhead
Party	Candidate	Votes	%	±%
Unionist	Tam Galbraith	20,094	68.32	+0.75
Labour	Thomas B. Duncan	9,317	31.68	−0.75
Majority		10,777	36.64	+1.49
Turnout		29,411	77.08	−2.84
Registered electors		38,154		
Unionist hold		Swing	+0.75	

=== Elections in the 1960s ===
General election 1964: Glasgow Hillhead
Party	Candidate	Votes	%	±%
Unionist	Tam Galbraith	16,993	64.0	−4.3
Labour	Thomas B. Duncan	9,572	36.0	+4.3
Majority		7,421	28.0	−8.6
Turnout		26,565	74.7	−2.4
Registered electors		35,580		
Unionist hold		Swing	−4.4	

General election 1966: Glasgow Hillhead
Party	Candidate	Votes	%	±%
Conservative	Tam Galbraith	15,899	62.9	−1.1
Labour	William Boyle	9,384	37.1	+1.1
Majority		6,515	25.8	−2.2
Turnout		25,283	73.5	−1.2
Registered electors		34,388		
Conservative hold		Swing	−1.1	

=== Elections in the 1970s ===
General election 1970: Glasgow Hillhead
Party	Candidate	Votes	%	±%
Conservative	Tam Galbraith	14,674	61.3	−1.6
Labour	Vince Cable	7,303	30.5	−6.6
SNP	George Wotherspoon	1,957	8.2	New
Majority		7,371	30.8	+5.0
Turnout		23,934	69.5	−4.0
Conservative hold		Swing		

General election February 1974: Glasgow Hillhead
Party	Candidate	Votes	%	±%
Conservative	Tam Galbraith	14,378	44.0	−17.3
Labour	D. Welsh	7,997	24.4	−6.1
Liberal	Louise Steedman	6,644	20.3	New
SNP	Keith Sydney Bovey	3,702	11.3	+3.1
Majority		6,381	19.6	−11.2
Turnout		32,721	78.8	+9.3
Conservative hold		Swing		

General election October 1974: Glasgow Hillhead
Party	Candidate	Votes	%	±%
Conservative	Tam Galbraith	11,203	37.1	−6.9
Labour	D. Welsh	8,507	28.2	+3.8
SNP	G. Borthwick	6,897	22.9	+11.6
Liberal	Alan Rennie	3,596	11.9	−8.4
Majority		2,696	8.9	−10.7
Turnout		30,203	72.4	−6.4
Conservative hold		Swing		

General election 1979: Glasgow Hillhead
Party	Candidate	Votes	%	±%
Conservative	Tam Galbraith	12,368	41.0	+3.9
Labour	Richard Mowbray	10,366	34.4	+6.2
Liberal	Marshall Harris	4,349	14.4	+2.5
SNP	G. Borthwick	3,050	10.1	−12.8
Majority		2,002	6.6	−2.3
Turnout		30,133	71.9	−0.5
Conservative hold		Swing	−1.2	

=== Elections in the 1980s ===
1982 Glasgow Hillhead by-election
Party	Candidate	Votes	%	±%
SDP	Roy Jenkins	10,106	33.4	+19.0
Conservative	Gerry Malone	8,068	26.6	−14.4
Labour	David Wiseman	7,846	25.9	−8.5
SNP	George Leslie	3,416	11.3	+1.2
Protestant Crusade against the Papal Visit	Jack Glass	388	1.3	New
Social Democrat (1979)	Roy Harold Jenkins	282	0.9	New
Ecology	Nicolette Carlaw	178	0.6	New
Public Safety Democratic Monarchist White Resident	Bill Boaks	5	0.0	New
Majority		2,038	6.8	N/A
Turnout		30,289	76.4	+4.5
SDP gain from Conservative		Swing	+23.9	

General election 1983: Glasgow Hillhead
Party	Candidate	Votes	%	±%
SDP	Roy Jenkins	14,856	36.2	
Labour	Neil Carmichael	13,692	33.4	
Conservative	Murray Tosh	9,678	23.5	
SNP	George Leslie	2,203	5.4	
Ind. Conservative	John P. Davidson	249	0.6	
Ecology	Alastair Whitelaw	239	0.6	N/A
Animal Rights Campaign - Scottish Anti-Vivisection	John Frederick Robins	139	0.3	New
Majority		1,164	2.8	N/A
Turnout		41,056	71.9	
SDP gain from Labour		Swing		

The constituency's boundaries were significantly altered for the 1983 general election and it was estimated by the BBC and ITN that on the new boundaries Labour would have captured the seat with a majority of just over 2,000 votes in 1979, thus making this a notional SDP gain from Labour. Neil Carmichael was the sitting Labour MP for the Glasgow Kelvingrove constituency which had been abolished for this election.

General election 1987: Glasgow Hillhead
Party	Candidate	Votes	%	±%
Labour	George Galloway	17,958	42.9	+9.5
SDP	Roy Jenkins	14,707	35.1	−1.1
Conservative	Brian David Cooklin	6,048	14.5	−9.0
SNP	Bill Kidd	2,713	6.5	+1.1
Green	Alastair Whitelaw	443	1.1	+0.5
Majority		3,251	7.8	N/A
Turnout		41,869	72.4	+0.5
Labour gain from SDP		Swing		

=== Elections in the 1990s ===
General election 1992: Glasgow Hillhead
Party	Candidate	Votes	%	±%
Labour	George Galloway	15,148	38.5	−4.4
Liberal Democrats	Chris Mason	10,322	26.2	−8.9
Conservative	Aileen Bates	6,728	17.1	+2.6
SNP	Sandra White	6,484	16.5	+10.0
Green	Lizbeth R. Collie	558	1.4	+0.3
Revolutionary Communist	Helen Gold	73	0.2	New
Natural Law	Duncan Patterson	60	0.1	New
Majority		4,826	12.3	+4.5
Turnout		39,373	68.7	−3.7
Labour hold		Swing		
