= William Roughead (rugby union) =

Scotland international rugby union player

- Born: William Roughead; 19 September 1905 Edinburgh, Scotland
- Died: 22 April 1975 (aged 69) London, England
- Notable relative(s): William Roughead, father

Rugby union career
- Position: Hooker
Amateur team(s)
Years	Team	Apps	(Points)
- Edinburgh Academicals
- London Scottish
Provincial / State sides
Years	Team	Apps	(Points)
1929	Anglo-Scots		
International career
Years	Team	Apps	(Points)
1927–32	Scotland	12	(0)

William Roughead (19 September 1905 – 22 April 1975) was a Scotland international rugby union player.

== Rugby Union career ==
=== Amateur career ===
Roughead played for Edinburgh Academicals.

He also played for London Scottish.

=== Provincial career ===
He played for Anglo-Scots against Provinces District on 21 December 1929.

He captained the Anglo-Scots against Provinces in January 1931.

=== International career ===
He played for Scotland 12 times in the period 1927 to 1932.

He captained Scotland against Wales in February 1931, and it was noted that the game for the Scots was played 'under the shadow of a great loss' as former SRU President James Aikman Smith had just died.

== Business career ==
He became a literary agent. He compiled an Anthology of prose and verse by Hilaire Belloc.

== Family ==
His father William Roughead (1870-1952) was a lawyer and amateur criminologist. His mother was Janey Thomson More (1871-1940). They had 4 children: a daughter Winifred Carfrae Roughead (1901-1929), and sons John Carfrae Roughead (1902-1981), Francis More Roughead (1904-1947) and William.

His brother Francis More Roughead also played for Edinburgh Academicals.
