= Robert Horne, 1st Viscount Horne of Slamannan =

British politician (1871–1940)

The Right Honourable The Viscount Horne of Slamannan GBE PC KC
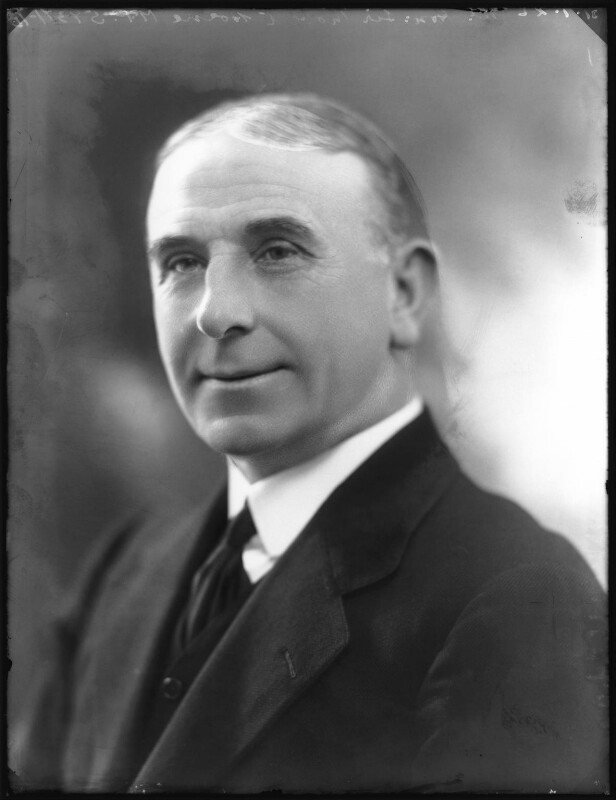
- Horne in 1922

Chancellor of the Exchequer
- In office 1 April 1921 – 19 October 1922
- Monarch: George V
- Prime Minister: David Lloyd George
- Preceded by: Austen Chamberlain
- Succeeded by: Stanley Baldwin

President of the Board of Trade
- In office 19 March 1920 – 1 April 1921
- Monarch: George V
- Prime Minister: David Lloyd George
- Preceded by: Sir Auckland Geddes
- Succeeded by: Stanley Baldwin

Minister of Labour
- In office 10 January 1919 – 19 March 1920
- Monarch: George V
- Prime Minister: David Lloyd George
- Preceded by: George Henry Roberts
- Succeeded by: Thomas James Macnamara

Member of Parliament for Glasgow Hillhead
- In office 14 December 1918 – 9 June 1937
- Preceded by: Constituency created
- Succeeded by: James Reid

Personal details
- Born: Robert Stevenson Horne; 28 February 1871 Slamannan, Stirlingshire
- Died: 3 September 1940 (aged 69)
- Party: Unionist
- Education: University of Glasgow
- Profession: Advocate

Robert Stevenson Horne, 1st Viscount Horne of Slamannan (28 February 1871 – 3 September 1940) was a Scottish businessman, advocate and Unionist politician. He served under David Lloyd George as Minister of Labour between 1919 and 1920, as President of the Board of Trade between 1920 and 1921 and as Chancellor of the Exchequer between 1921 and 1922. In 1937 he was ennobled as Viscount Horne of Slamannan.

== Background and education ==
Horne was born at Slamannan, Stirlingshire, the son of Reverend Robert Stevenson Horne, the village's Church of Scotland minister, and Mary, daughter of Thomas Lockhead. He was educated at George Watson's College in Edinburgh and the University of Glasgow, where he studied Law and was President of the Students' Representative Council.

== Career until 1918 ==
Horne then spent a year teaching philosophy at the University College of North Wales, before being elected to the Faculty of Advocates (Scottish Bar) in 1896. He became a successful advocate, specialising in commercial and shipping cases, and became a King's Counsel in 1910. He also served as Examiner in Philosophy (1896–1900) and Rector (1921–1924) at the University of Aberdeen. He was a board member of several companies including directorships of the Suez Canal Company, chairman of the Great Western Railway Company and director of several other companies and banks.

During the First World War, Horne became Director of Railways on the Western Front with the honorary rank of Lieutenant-Colonel in the Royal Engineers. In 1917 he joined the Admiralty as Assistant Inspector-General of Transportation, becoming Director of Materials and Priority in 1918, and Director of Labour and Third Civil Lord later the same year.

== Political career ==
Having unsuccessfully stood for Stirlingshire in both general elections of 1910, Horne was elected as Member of Parliament (MP) for Glasgow Hillhead in 1918. He served under David Lloyd George as Minister of Labour between 1919 and 1920, as President of the Board of Trade between 1920 and 1921 and as Chancellor of the Exchequer between 1921 and 1922. It was in that capacity that he was involved in the negotiations leading to the signing of the Anglo-Soviet Trade Agreement. Leonid Krasin pressurised Horne to support the treaty by threatening to cancel orders with textile mills in Yorkshire, as only the mills with Soviet orders were working full-time. When the treaty was signed, it was the first recognition by Britain of the Russian Soviet Federative Socialist Republic.

When the Lloyd George Coalition Government fell in 1922, Horne refused to join the new government of Bonar Law. Two years later, Stanley Baldwin offered to make Horne Minister of Labour once more, but Horne declined, preferring to concentrate on work in the City. Although he remained a Member of Parliament until 1937, he never again held ministerial office. He was appointed a Knight Commander of the Order of the British Empire (KBE) in 1918 for his war services, and raised to Knight Grand Cross (GBE) in the 1920 civilian war honours for his services as Minister of Labour. In 1919, he was also sworn of the Privy Council. He was ennobled as Viscount Horne of Slamannan, of Slamannan in the County of Stirling, on 9 June 1937.

== Personal life ==
Horne, a womanising bachelor, was famously referred to by Baldwin as a "Scots cad", a remark that has stuck. He died in September 1940, aged 69. The viscountcy became extinct with his death.

Parliament of the United Kingdom
New constituency	Member of Parliament for Glasgow Hillhead; 1918–1937	Succeeded by James Reid
Political offices
Preceded by George Henry Roberts	Minister of Labour; 1919–1920	Succeeded by Thomas James Macnamara
Preceded by Sir Auckland Geddes	President of the Board of Trade; 1920–1921	Succeeded by Stanley Baldwin
Preceded by Austen Chamberlain	Chancellor of the Exchequer; 1921–1922	Succeeded by Stanley Baldwin
Academic offices
Preceded by The Viscount Cowdray	Rector of the University of Aberdeen; 1921–1924	Succeeded by The Viscount Cecil of Chelwood
Peerage of the United Kingdom
New creation	Viscount Horne of Slamannan; 1937–1940	Extinct
