= William Gordon Bennett =

Sir William Gordon Bennett (19 February 1889 – 5 October 1982) was Unionist Party (Scotland) MP for Glasgow Woodside from 1950 to 1955.

Bennett saw military during the First World War, during which he was wounded. He was an officer in the Tank Corps at some point.

Bennett was a member of the Glasgow Royal Exchange and of the Glasgow Trades House. He was a magistrate and member of the Glasgow Corporation. He was president of the Scottish Unionist Association.

He contested Glasgow Shettleston in July 1945 before winning at Glasgow Woodside in 1950.

He was knighted in 1955 "for political and public services".

Parliament of the United Kingdom
New constituency	Member of Parliament for Glasgow Woodside; 1950 – 1955	Succeeded by William Grant
