= Sandyford murder case =

1862 British murder case

The Sandyford murder case (also known as the Sandyford Place Mystery) is a well-known 19th-century case from the United Kingdom. The murder in question is one of four notorious ones that took place in an infamous area of Glasgow known as the Square Mile of Murder, which lies around Charing Cross, "situated where Sauchiehall Street is coming to an end as a shopping centre and giving way to well-built terraces". The Sandyford case revolves around the brutal murder of one Jessie McPherson, a servant, at 17 Sandyford Place, Glasgow, Scotland, in July 1862. McPherson's friend Jessie McLachlan later stood trial, accused of having murdered McPherson.

The Sandyford case was the first Scottish police case in which forensic photography played a role, and the first case handled by the detective branch of the Glasgow Police.

The case was heard at the Glasgow Circuit Court between Wednesday 17 and Saturday 20 September 1862. During the trial, McLachlan resolutely declared her innocence, and accused the father of the woman's employer, one James Fleming, age 87, of having committed the crime, perhaps in a fit of passion when McPherson refused his amorous advances. The summing-up of the evidence, delivered by Judge Lord Deas, lasted for more than four hours and, after nineteen minutes' deliberation, the jury returned a unanimous guilty verdict. Before sentence was passed, a final statement was read on behalf of the prisoner, giving her detailed account of what had happened on the night of the murder. However, the Judge denounced it as a "tissue of wicked falsehoods" and sentenced her to death, which was to be carried out by hanging on 11 October 1862.

However, due to a public outcry, in an unprecedented action, a Court Commission was appointed to investigate the evidence in the case. The commission did not declare her innocent, but did commute her sentence to life imprisonment.

McLachlan served 15 years in Perth General Prison before being released on ticket-of-leave on 5 October 1877. She emigrated to the United States and married again. She died in Port Huron, Michigan, on New Year's Day in 1899.

The case is given a passing mention in the last chapter of E.C. Bentley's 1913 detective novel Trent's Last Case, in the thirteenth chapter of Dorothy Sayers' 1937 detective novel Busman’s Honeymoon, and in the third chapter of Gladys Mitchell's 13th Mrs Bradley crime novel, When Last I Died, published in 1941. It was recounted by Jack House in his 1961 book Square Mile of Murder, which was dramatised by the BBC in 1980. The murder, trial and aftermath are covered in scrupulous detail in Heaven Knows Who (1960) by Christianna Brand, otherwise known as a respected writer of mysteries. There are two references to this case in Seeing Is Believing (also published as Cross of Murder) a Sir Henry Merrivale novel by Carter Dickson (pen name of John Dickson Carr) first published by Morrow (US, 1941) and Heinemann (UK, 1942). In Chapter 20 there's quite a long account of the Sandyford Murder Mystery. The third episode of Scotland's Murder Mysteries, titled "Jessie McLachlan", details the case with notes from modern experts and is produced by STV Productions. The seventh episode of the fifth series of the BBC One series Murder, Mystery and My Family on 6 July 2021 also reinvestigated the case upholding the original decision.
