= Tam Galbraith =

Scottish politician (1917–1982)

The Right Honourable Sir Thomas Galbraith KBE
- Galbraith c. 1950

Parliamentary Secretary to the Ministry of Transport
- In office 3 May 1963 – 16 October 1964
- Prime Minister: Alec Douglas-Home
- Preceded by: John Hay
- Succeeded by: Stephen Swingler

Under-Secretary of State for Scotland
- In office 22 October 1959 – 8 November 1962
- Prime Minister: Harold Macmillan
- Preceded by: John Hope
- Succeeded by: Priscilla Buchan

Civil Lord of the Admiralty
- In office 18 January 1957 – 16 October 1959
- Prime Minister: Harold Macmillan
- Preceded by: Simon Wingfield Digby
- Succeeded by: Ian Orr-Ewing

Treasurer of the Household
- In office 13 June 1955 – 19 January 1957
- Prime Minister: Anthony Eden
- Preceded by: Cedric Drewe
- Succeeded by: Hendrie Oakshott

Comptroller of the Household
- In office 7 June 1954 – 13 June 1955
- Prime Minister: Winston Churchill; Anthony Eden
- Preceded by: Roger Conant
- Succeeded by: Hendrie Oakshott

Member of Parliament for Glasgow Hillhead
- In office 25 November 1948 – 2 January 1982
- Preceded by: James Reid
- Succeeded by: Roy Jenkins

Personal details
- Party: Conservative
- Other political affiliations: Unionist (until 1965)
- Nickname: Tam Galbraith

Military service
- Allegiance: United Kingdom
- Branch/service: Royal Navy Reserve
- Years of service: 1939–1946
- Rank: Lieutenant
- Battles/wars: World War II
- Born: 10 March 1917
- Died: 2 January 1982 (aged 64); Mauchline, Ayrshire, Scotland, UK
- Education: Christ Church, Oxford; University of Glasgow
- Spouse: Simone du Roy de Blicquy
- Children: 3 including Thomas Galbraith, 2nd Baron Strathclyde
- Father: Thomas Galbraith, 1st Baron Strathclyde

Sir Thomas Galloway Dunlop Galbraith (10 March 1917 – 2 January 1982), known as Tam Galbraith, was a Scottish Unionist politician.

== Early life ==
The eldest son and heir of Thomas Galbraith, 1st Baron Strathclyde, Galbraith was educated at Aytoun House, Glasgow; Wellington College; Christ Church, Oxford (MA), and at the University of Glasgow (LLB).

He served as a lieutenant in the Royal Naval Volunteer Reserve 1939–1946.

== Political career ==
Galbraith unsuccessfully contested Paisley in July 1945, and Edinburgh East at a by-election in October 1945 before being elected for Glasgow Hillhead at a by-election in 1948. Galbraith won the seat with an increased majority, although his Labour rival's vote share was only slightly reduced. In victory, Galbraith expressed pleasure that the campaign between the parties had been "clean" and "friendly". Commenting on the by-election, an editorial in The Glasgow Herald noted that he had increased the Unionist Party's majority by a third, which it argued was "a notable achievement by a young candidate succeeding one of the outstanding Unionist members of recent years." It also criticised the view that the result was disappointing for Conservative and Unionists due to the fact that the result was not as good as that achieved in the recent Edmonton by-election, where the Conservative vote had substantially increased while Labour's vote fell significantly.

He was Assistant Conservative Whip (1950), a Government Whip (1951–57), Civil Lord of the Admiralty (1957–59), Under-Secretary of State for Scotland (1959–62), and Parliamentary Secretary to the Ministry of Transport, (1963–64).

=== Vassall affair ===
During Galbraith's time at the Admiralty, questions were raised about his connection to the Soviet spy John Vassall, a former Admiralty employee, after letters from Galbraith were found in Vassall's possession. It was thought odd that a minister would communicate by post with an official of his own department, and there was considerable speculation of impropriety in the press. Given Vassall's known homosexuality, rumours began to circulate that Vassall and Galbraith were involved with each other and that Galbraith might have shielded Vassall from discovery.

The committee of civil servants originally established to probe the Vassall affair investigated the correspondence and declared it innocent, but the verdict was not universally accepted. Eventually the Prime Minister was compelled to open a wider inquiry, conducted by three jurists. This second inquiry determined that Vassall had not been helped or favoured by any of his seniors.

Vassall later denied in his memoirs that there had been any sexual relationship between the two men.

== Honours ==
Galbraith was President of the Scottish Georgian Society from 1970 to 1980 and was a Member of the Royal Company of Archers. He was knighted as a Knight Commander of the Order of the British Empire (KBE)) in the 1982 New Year Honours for Political and Public Service.

== Death and aftermath ==
Galbraith died at the start of 1982, while still a Member of Parliament. He had successfully fought ten elections and, with 33 years of service, was Scotland's longest-serving MP. Prime Minister Margaret Thatcher, in response to his death, said she was "deeply saddened by his death, especially so soon after his knighthood had been announced." The Glasgow Herald claimed he was known "as the quiet man of Scottish politics".

Galbraith's death triggered a high-profile by-election for the Hillhead seat which would have a major impact on British politics. In the immediate aftermath of the news that Galbraith had died, Denis Sullivan, the chairman of the newly established Social Democratic Party in Scotland, indicated that the majority of the party in Scotland wished one of the SDP's founders, and former Labour Chancellor of the Exchequer, Roy Jenkins, to be their candidate at the by-election. Jenkins ultimately won the contest, enabling him to emerge as the person who would lead the SDP–Liberal Alliance at the next general election.

== Marriage and family ==
Galbraith married Simone Clotilde Fernande Marie Ghislaine Blicquy on 11 April 1956. They had three children:

- (Anne Marie) Ghislaine du Roy Galbraith (born 14 December 1957)
- Thomas Galloway Dunlop du Roy de Blicquy Galbraith, 2nd Baron Strathclyde (born 22 February 1960)
- Charles William Du Roy De Blicquy Galbraith (born 20 May 1962)

Galbraith predeceased his father, the 1st Baron. His elder son succeeded as 2nd Baron in 1985 and was subsequently a Conservative junior Minister, Chief Whip in the Lords and Leader of the House of Lords.

Parliament of the United Kingdom
Preceded by James Reid	Member of Parliament for Glasgow Hillhead; 1948–1982	Succeeded by Roy Jenkins
Political offices
Preceded by Roger Conant	Comptroller of the Household; 1954–1955	Succeeded by Hendrie Oakshott
Preceded by Cedric Drewe	Treasurer of the Household; 1955–1957	Succeeded by Hendrie Oakshott
Preceded by Simon Wingfield Digby	Civil Lord of the Admiralty; 1957–1959	Succeeded by Ian Orr-Ewing
Preceded by John Hope	Under-Secretary of State for Scotland; 1959–1962	Succeeded by Priscilla Buchan
Preceded by John Hughes-Hallett	Parliamentary Secretary to the Ministry of Transport; 1963–1964	Succeeded by The Lord Lindgren
