= 1937 Glasgow Hillhead by-election =

UK parliamentary by-election

The 1937 Glasgow Hillhead by-election was held on 10 June 1937. The by-election was held due to the elevation to the peerage of the incumbent Conservative MP, Robert Horne. It was won by the Conservative candidate James Reid. Reid felt that his victory was a good result and said it showed that Glasgow retained confidence in the National Government. He also believed the drop in vote for his party was due to electors being on holiday and unable to return to Glasgow to vote and because an old electoral register was used. The turnout of 56% was the lowest that had yet been seen in Hillhead, being significantly lower than the previous low turnout of 63% set in 1918, while the Independent candidate, David J. Black's vote total was the lowest for any candidate who had contested a parliamentary election in Glasgow up until that point. Black, who styled himself a 'Liberal-Unionist', ran what was described by the Glasgow Herald as an 'unorthodox' campaign that 'was probably the only piquant touch in an otherwise matter-of-fact by-election'.

Glasgow Hillhead by-election, 1937
Party	Candidate	Votes	%	±%
Unionist	James Reid	12,539	56.52	−11.68
Labour	Gilbert McAllister	7,539	33.98	+2.18
SNP	John MacCormick	1,886	8.50	New
Independent	David J. Black	221	1.00	New
Majority		5,000	22.54	−13.85
Turnout		22,185		
Unionist hold		Swing		
