= Square Mile of Murder =

Area of west-central Glasgow, Scotland

The Square Mile of Murder relates to an area of west-central Glasgow, Scotland. The term was coined by the Scottish journalist and author Jack House, whose 1961 book of the same name was based on the fact that four of Scotland's most infamous murders were committed within an area of 1 square mile (2.6 km2).

== The area ==
Locations of the 'Square Mile' murders

The area stretches northwards from Blythswood Hill in the western end of Glasgow city centre to Sauchiehall Street and west towards the Charing Cross area. It is nowadays bisected by the M8 motorway.

== The murders and locations ==
The four murder cases took place between 1857 and 1908.

1. The case against Madeleine Smith was found to be not proven, that she laced her lover Pierre Emile L'Angelier's cocoa with arsenic (Blythswood Square).
2. The Sandyford murder case, in which Jessie McPherson was brutally struck forty times with a meat cleaver. Her friend Jessie McLachlan was accused and found guilty of the murder; McLachlan always maintained her innocence, accusing McPherson's employer's elderly father of the murder instead (Sandyford Place).
3. The serial killer Dr Edward William Pritchard, known as "The Human Crocodile". His three victims included his mother-in-law, Jane Taylor, and his wife, Mary Jane Pritchard, whom he poisoned, then had the coffin lid unscrewed so that he could kiss her (Berkeley Street, Sauchiehall Street).
4. Marion Gilchrist's death in 1908 was pinned on Oscar Slater, the subject of a major miscarriage of justice (West Princes Street).

== 21st century ==
In 2021, Esther Brown was murdered at her home on West Princes Street, one of the roads in the mile.

== Television adaptation ==
House's book was adapted as a six-part television series by the BBC in 1980. The cast included George Baker (as Madeleine Smith's father), Anthony Bate (as Pritchard), Simon Cadell, Neil Connery, Gregor Fisher, Rikki Fulton, John Grieve, James Hazeldine, and Tony Roper.
