= 1948 Glasgow Hillhead by-election =

UK parliamentary by-election

A 1948 by-election for the constituency of Glasgow Hillhead in the UK House of Commons was held on 25 November 1948, caused by the appointment as a Lord of Appeal in Ordinary of the incumbent Unionist MP James Reid. The result was a hold for the Unionist Party, with their candidate Tam Galbraith.

== Result ==
Glasgow Hillhead by-election, 1948
| Party | Candidate | Votes | % | ±% |
|---|---|---|---|---|
| Unionist | Tam Galbraith | 16,060 | 68.4 | +9.8 |
| Labour | T A MacNair | 7,419 | 31.6 | −2.0 |
| Majority | | 8,641 | 36.8 | +11.8 |
| Turnout | | 23,479 | | |
| Unionist hold | | Swing | | |

Despite a clear victory for their party some Scottish Unionist MPs were reportedly disappointed by the result given that the recent Edmonton by-election had seen the Conservative Party's vote substantially increased while Labour's vote fell greatly. Commenting on the by-election, an editorial in The Glasgow Herald rejected and criticised this assessment, noting that there was a lower turnout and opining that it was a "a notable achievement" that Galbraith had increased the Unionist Party's majority by a third, given that, in the newspaper's view, he was "a young candidate succeeding one of the outstanding Unionist members of recent years."

== Previous election ==
General election 1945: Glasgow Hillhead
| Party | Candidate | Votes | % | ±% |
|---|---|---|---|---|
| Unionist | James Reid | 14,909 | 58.6 | −9.6 |
| Labour | HT MacCalman | 8,545 | 33.6 | +1.8 |
| Liberal | John Gray Wilson | 2,003 | 7.8 | New |
| Majority | | 6,364 | 25.0 | −11.4 |
| Turnout | | 25,457 | 66.0 | −7.2 |
| Unionist hold | | Swing | | |
