= Jack House =

Scottish writer and broadcaster

John House (16 May 1906 – 11 April 1991) was a prolific and popular Scottish writer and broadcaster, with a significant attachment to the City of Glasgow.

== Early life ==
=== East end ===
House was born in Tollcross, then in the County of Lanark, just outside the Glasgow city boundary. This, together with the fact that both of his parents were born in England, would come as a surprise to those who knew him as "Mr Glasgow", so thoroughly did he identify himself with the culture and people of that city. He felt that Glasgow was a fairly autonomous "city state". That his father, also John, was a prosperous company secretary and Jack himself trained as an accountant would only add to the surprise, given Glasgow's "Red Clydeside" reputation.

The family rapidly moved to Dennistoun where Jack (and subsequently his four brothers and three sisters) attended Whitehill Secondary School. At his father's insistence he began training as an accountant. Accounting did not suit Jack's temperament, nor did it challenge his abilities, which lay towards writing, spinning yarns and acting.

=== Journalism ===
In 1928, he got a job as a reporter on the Glasgow Evening Citizen, where he was involved in a number of sensational stories – including a tragic blaze at the Glen Cinema in Paisley in which 80 children had perished. He also attended an early demonstration of mechanical television by John Logie Baird. Meanwhile, he continued to act – mostly light parts (in the Scottish National Players as well as for BBC Radio). He worked also for the city's other papers the Evening News and the Evening Times, being the last of the city's three evening papers, and contributed to The Bulletin, Glasgow Herald and the Scottish Field.

=== Army, acting, script writing and political activity ===
During the second world war he attained the rank of captain in the cinematographic unit, for which he wrote scripts (in the company of Peter Ustinov and David Niven).

He was well connected with the media classes of both Glasgow and Edinburgh,. He was also active politically, standing unsuccessfully in a 1962 by-election for the Liberal Party in the Glasgow Woodside constituency, where he then lived. He also campaigned against the Glasgow Inner Ring Road and the construction of Glasgow's peripheral housing estates, such as Easterhouse and Nitshill, which resulted in the decline of traditional inner-city districts, a phenomenon known as Counter urbanisation.

== Writer and bon viveur ==
=== Author ===
It is, though, as a writer that he is best known. He published 54 books, and possibly even more. Many of his books had been commissioned and some were obviously meant to be "fun" books. Several others had been commissioned by local authorities or tourist boards with a view to promoting their areas. Large companies – especially builders and whisky distillers – commissioned histories of their success from him, as did the locally renowned "Western Baths". All of these commissions are testimony to his engaging style, as well as an investigative prowess derived from his journalism.

He produced other substantial works closer to his personal interests, such as Heart of Glasgow. However, one of his biggest successes was Square Mile of Murder. In this he described and analysed several notorious 19th-century murders, and miscarriages of justice, in the middle-class districts in the west of the city. Among these were the cases of Madeleine Smith, (played, like the rest of the cast, with a perfect English accent by Ann Todd in David Lean's 1949 film Madeleine) and Oscar Slater.

He tried his hand as a novelist in House on the Hill, with limited success (although it was later dramatised by Scottish Television). However, his sparkling journalism never went out of fashion – despite the fact that he had always warned that he never let a concern for facts get in his way if there was a good story to be told. His "'Ask Jack" column in the Glasgow Evening Citizen gave lively answers (most of them true) to readers' questions on all aspects of the City. He was often on television, with STV and BBC Scotland, and formed a winning partnership with Sir James Fergusson in the long-running radio series Round Britain Quiz.

Pavement in the Sun is an attempt at autobiography.

=== Restaurant critic ===
He regularly acted as restaurant critic for that paper, where, as usual, his partisanship for the city over-ruled any more nuanced judgements. The view from one restaurant table looked down along the Great Western Road. "Like the Champs Elysées – only better!", was Mr Glasgow's considered verdict. He spent a great deal of time in the "Ubiquitous Chip" restaurant and there is a caricature of him – buck teeth and all – by Emilio Coia still hanging over his habitual table. The restaurant was close to Jack's last home – a flat in a classic Glasgow tenement. His substantial Edwardian flat in Beaumont Gate, was in Dowanhill, where he had always aspired to stay. This, like his birth and childhood homes was of striking red sandstone – a Glaswegian architectural/visual code for "extremely well-off".

== Final years ==
He married Jessie Lottimer Bennett Miller, herself an outstanding journalist (who died in 1974). They had no children.

He was awarded the St Mungo Prize Glasgow's top honour, in 1988, and Glasgow University awarded him an Honorary Doctorate of Laws. The St Mungo Prize is awarded to the individual who has done most in the previous three years to improve and promote the city of Glasgow.

He died in Glasgow Western Infirmary on 11 April 1991.

== Bibliography ==
- Baths: the story of the Western Baths, Hillhead from 1876 to 1990 by W.M. Mann; with additional material by Jack House. 1993
- Beatles quiz book compiled by Jack House. [With plates and illustrations, including portraits.] 1964
- Century of box-making. A history of Andrew Ritchie and Son Limited from 1850 to 1950. [With plates, including portraits.] 1955
- Cherchez La Femme. A simple sketch in Scots [in one act.] 1936
- Comics in kilts / illustrated by Bill Tait. 1945
- Down the Clyde. [With illustrations, including maps.] 1959
- Dumfries and Galloway. [With illustrations.] 1963
- Dunoon, 1868–1968 written by Jack House 1968
- Dunoon, on the Firth of Clyde. Official guide / written by Jack House. [With illustrations and maps.] (two editions – 1947 and 1953)
- Eight plays for Wolf Cubs / by Jack House and Theo Brown. (1928, reissued 1961)
- Family affair. The story of David Carlaw & Sons, Ltd. of Glasgow. [With illustrations, including portraits.] 1960
- Friendly adventure. The story of the City of Glasgow Friendly Society's first hundred years / by Jack House. [Illustrated.] 1962
- Getting around the Clyde. [With illustrations and a map.] 1946 and 1948
- Glasgow old and new [compiled by] Jack House 1974 (ISBN 0-7158-1078-2), revised 1983 (ISBN 0-86267-023-3), and again in 1988 (ISBN 0-550-22563-3)
- Glory of Scotland : The West / (colour photographs by W.S. Thomson.). 1962
- Heart of Glasgow / Jack House. 1965, 1972, 1978, 1982, 1991, 2005, 2011 (with preface by Jack McLean)
- House on the hill / Jack House, 1981
- How to clean an elephant, and other facts of life / by Jack House. 1948
- Kirkcaldy: the official guide / text by Jack House. Sketches by Joan Eardley. [With a map.] 1940
- Lang Toun / by Jack House. 1975
- Lochrin's hundred years. The story of William Bain & Company Ltd. of Coatbridge. [Illustrated.] 1959
- Macalaster & Alison : the insurance brokers, 1877–1977 / by Jack House. 1978
- Murder not proven? 1962, 1984, 1986, 1989
- Music Hall Memories – Recollections of Scottish Music Hall and Pantomime 1986
- Out from Oban. [With illustrations.] 1962
- Pavement in the sun. [An autobiography. Illustrated.] 1967
- Plumber in Glasgow : the history of the firm of Hugh Twaddle & Son, Ltd from 1848 to 1948 / by Jack House; with four drawings by Robert Eadie. 1948
- Portrait of the Clyde by Jack House 1969, 1975
- Pride of Perth the story of Arthur Bell & Sons Ltd, Scotch whisky distillers Jack House 1976
- Robert Paterson builder, 1827–1977 by Jack House 1977
- Romance of Long John / by Jack House. 1982
- Sailing down the Clyde : Glasgow to Kyles of Bute / by Jack House. 1969
- Scotland for fun : a quiz book / Jack House 1962, 1983
- Scott country. Around the Borders. [With illustrations, including a map.] 1962
- Skye and the Western Isles. [With illustrations, including maps.] 1962
- Spirit of White Horse / by Jack House. 1971
- Square mile of murder / Jack House; [An account of four famous Glasgow murder cases. With plates, including portraits. foreword by Robert Jeffrey; introduction by Donald R. Findlay]. (1961, 1975, 1984, 1988) 2002
- Stewarton by Jack House 1971
- Tale of two houses / Jack House. 1980
