= Edinburgh Festival Fringe Society =

The Edinburgh Festival Fringe Society is the organisation that supports the running of the Edinburgh Festival Fringe, the largest arts festival in the world. The Society was established in 1958 to provide a centralised information and box office service for the Fringe, which had grown in numbers since eight theatre companies had effectively "created" the Fringe by performing uninvited alongside the Edinburgh International Festival in 1947.

Phoebe Waller-Bridge, whose show Fleabag was performed at the Fringe in 2013, was named President of the Edinburgh Festival Fringe Society in 2021.

== History ==
The first formal discussions regarding the establishment of a central body for the Fringe took place in 1954. By that year, the Fringe was attracting around a dozen companies, and a meeting was held to discuss creating "a small organisation to act as a brain for the Fringe", or what The Scotsman called an "official unofficial festival".

However, it was not until 1958 when the idea of a Festival Fringe Society was properly established, by Michael Imison, director of Oxford Theatre Group. A constitution was drawn up, in which the policy of not vetting or censoring shows was set out, and the Society was officially launched at the Fringe of 1959.

On 22 May 1969 the Fringe Society was incorporated as a company limited by guarantee with a board of directors and Edinburgh solicitors' firm, Bell and Scott, Bruce and Kerr as Company Secretaries. William Grant, Lord Grant was the first chairman.

It is also a registered charity.

== Purpose ==
The Society performs no curatorial role for the Fringe. Rather, it formalises the process of event registration, promotion and ticket selling, while also acting in an advisory and advocacy capacity. A founding principle of the Fringe was that no single individual or committee should determine who can appear. It remains an open access arts festival, accommodating anyone with a desire to perform and a venue willing to host them.

The Society therefore has no artistic director, only administrators. For some years the lead (or only) official in the Fringe Society was known as the Fringe Administrator. Only in recent years has the term Chief Executive been used to describe the head of the Fringe Society.

The Society has a board of directors, which oversees the core Fringe staff. The first chair of the board was Lord Grant. In 1970, the actor Andrew Cruickshank became chair, to be succeeded in 1983 by Jonathan Miller, and then by Elizabeth Smith, Baroness Smith, widow of former Labour Leader John Smith. The current chair is Benny Higgins, who succeeded Professor Sir Timothy O'Shea 2021.

The first full-time Fringe chief was John Milligan, a former teacher who left in 1976 to run the Craigmillar Festival. He was succeeded by writer and historian Alistair Moffat, who left in 1981 to become Head of Arts at Scottish Television. In turn, he was replaced by Michael Dale, who departed in 1986 to become Head of Events for the Glasgow Garden Festival. He was succeeded by his deputy, Mhairi Mackenzie-Robinson, who left in 1993 to pursue a career in business. Hilary Strong served in the position until 1999, when she then became director of the Greenwich Theatre. She was followed by Paul Gudgin (2000–2007), Jon Morgan (2007–2008), and Kath Mainland (2008–2015). In November 2015, Mainland announced her decision to step down as chief executive in order to take on the role of executive director of the Melbourne Festival, and in early 2016 it was announced that her successor would be Shona McCarthy, who had headed up the 2013 Derry-Londonderry UK City of Culture. She took up the position in March 2016.

Membership of the Fringe Society is open to anyone.

The Society has three specified core objectives:

- providing support, advice and encouragement to all the amazing artists, producers and venues who create the Fringe each year, from help with choosing a venue or writing a press release, to advice on touring, free access to rehearsal space, and professional development activities and events
- assisting the audiences who come to Edinburgh by helping you navigate what’s on offer with comprehensive, accurate and up-to-date information and ticketing
- celebrating this wonderful and unique festival around the world

=== Vision and values ===
In 2022, the festival's 75th anniversary year, the Fringe Society consulted with stakeholders from across the festival – from artists to venues, residents to government bodies – to create a shared vision and set of values. The vision was “to give anyone a stage and everyone a seat”. Rooted in equality and inclusiveness, it was designed inspire all Fringe stakeholders to pull in the same direction.

Three values were also established to guide the behaviours and decisions of everyone involved with the Fringe; the Fringe Society said they will “live by them, champion them and uphold them where necessary”. The three values are:

• Celebrate performing arts

• Be open to all

• Look out for each other

== Premises ==
The Fringe Society is based at offices on the Royal Mile. It is designated as "Venue 1" in Fringe listings. The building also serves as the Fringe Shop and, during August, as a box office. The shop stocks Fringe memorabilia and copies of the brochure. The strip of the Royal Mile outside is closed to traffic during the Fringe, and becomes an area for street performers, often giving snippets of shows which can be seen in full elsewhere.

During August, the Society also operates Fringe Central (designated "Venue 2"), a hub for press and performers. In 2019, this was based at Appleton Tower on Crichton Street.

== Heads of the Festival Fringe Society ==
NB: The title of the lead officer of the Society has varied throughout its existence.

- 1970-76 John Milligan
- 1976-81 Alistair Moffat
- 1981-86 Michael Dale
- 1986-93 Mhairi Mackenzie-Robinson
- 1993-99 Hilary Strong
- 2000-07 Paul Gudgin
- 2007-08 Jon Morgan
- 2008-15 Kath Mainland
- 2016- Shona McCarthy

== Bibliography ==
- Dale, Michael (1988). Sore Throats and Overdrafts: An illustrated story of the Edinburgh Festival Fringe. Edinburgh: Precedent Publications. ISBN 0 9512 6502 4.
- Fisher, Mark (2012). The Edinburgh Fringe Survival Guide: How To Make Your Show A Success. London: Methuen. ISBN 978 1 408 13252 4.
- Moffatt, Alistair (1978). The Edinburgh Fringe. London: Johnston and Bacon. ISBN 0 7179 4245 7.
