= Social Democratic Party (UK, 1979) =

Former British political party formed in 1979

The Social Democratic Party was a minor centre-left political party founded in Manchester in 1979 by Donald Kean. The party fielded one candidate in Warrington at the 1979 UK general election who received 144 votes and came bottom of the poll. At the 1980 Glasgow Central by-election, Kean stood again, winning ten votes – one of the lowest totals polled in a British by-election since 1918. The following year, a group of high-profile Labour Party figures formed a new Social Democratic Party, gaining far more attention than Kean's group. He hoped to force the new party to change their name. By coincidence, there was the 1981 Warrington by-election and Kean stood against the new party with the slogan "Enforce Law, End Poverty, Create Jobs". The 1979 SDP's vote fell to 0.1% of the total.

The party's final candidacy came at the 1982 Glasgow Hillhead by-election, where Roy Jenkins, a leading figure in the newer SDP, was a candidate. Kean's SDP fielded Douglas Parkin, who changed his name to "Roy Harold Jenkins" by deed poll. The SDP took "Roy Harold Jenkins" to court, claiming that this attempt to confuse voters constituted a corrupt practice under the Representation of the People Act. They failed to convince the court; the SDP was permitted to draw attention to the position of their candidate on the ballot paper, and did so in a wide variety of ways. The better-known Roy Jenkins was able to win the seat, while Kean's party took 282 votes, their best result. Kean's SDP did not stand in any further elections.
