= Oscar Slater =

Victim of a miscarriage of justice in Scotland (1872–1948)

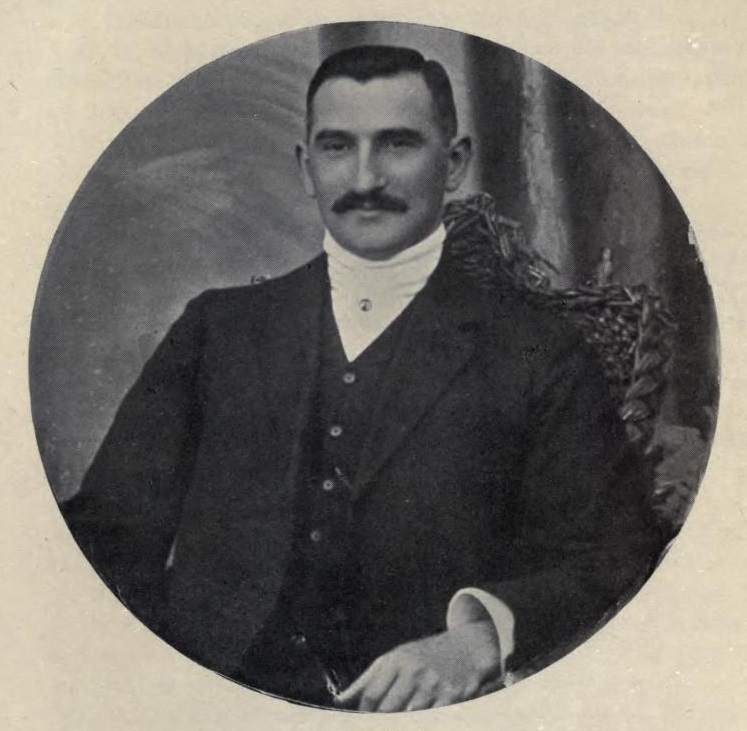
Oscar Slater 1908

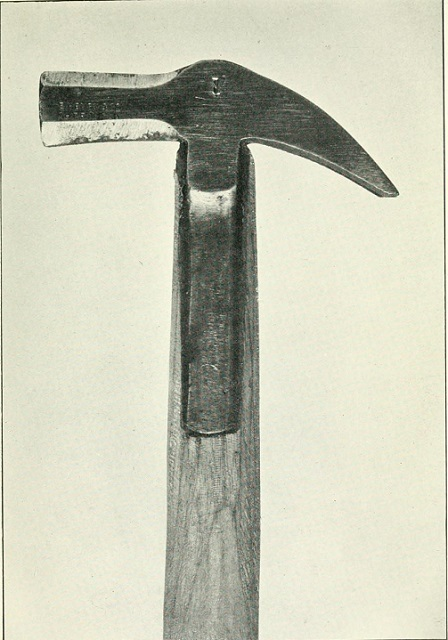
Oscar Slater's hammer

Oscar Joseph Slater (8 January 1872 – 31 January 1948) was the victim of a notorious miscarriage of justice in Scotland. Wrongly convicted of murder and sentenced to death, he was freed after almost two decades of hard labour at Scotland’s HM Prison Peterhead through the efforts of multiple journalists, lawyers, and writers, including Sherlock Holmes author Sir Arthur Conan Doyle.

== Early life ==
Slater was born Oskar Josef Leschziner in Oppeln, Upper Silesia, German Empire, to a Jewish family. Around 1893, possibly to evade military service, he moved to London, where he purportedly worked as a bookmaker using various names, including Anderson, before settling on Slater for official purposes. He was prosecuted for alleged malicious wounding in 1896 and assault in 1897 but was acquitted in both cases.

In 1899, Slater moved to Edinburgh and by 1901 was living in Glasgow. He was known to be a well-dressed dandy, who billed himself variously as a dentist and a dealer in precious stones, but was believed to earn his living as a gambler.

== Marion Gilchrist ==
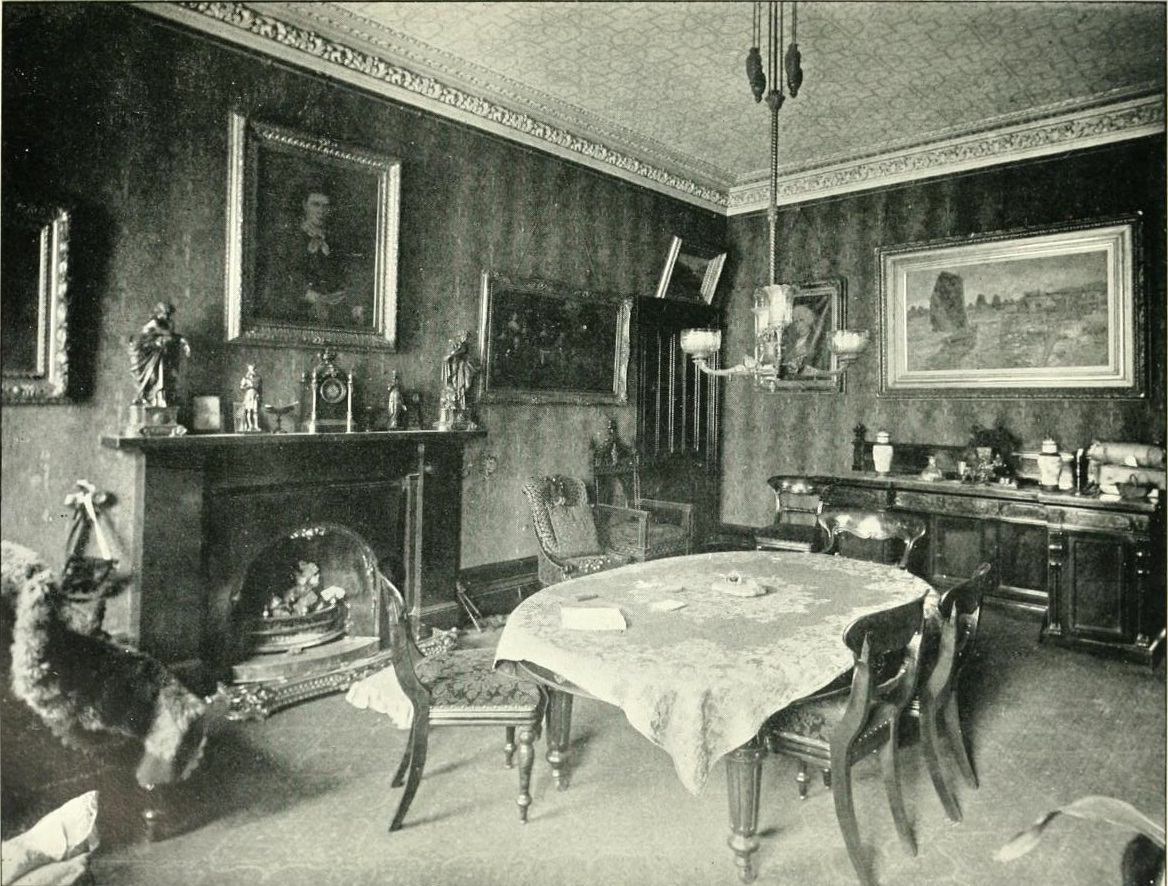
The victim's dining room and the site of the murder

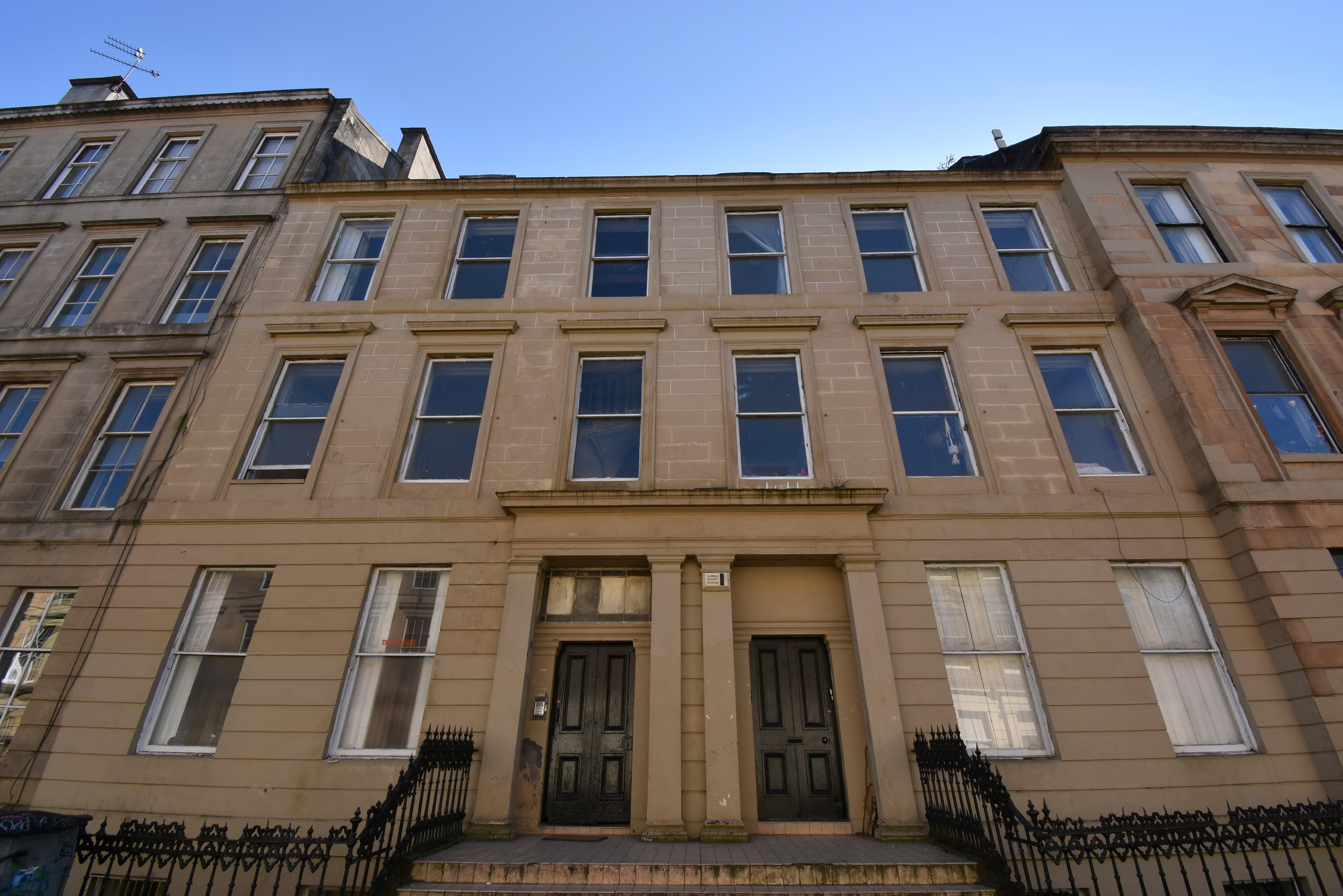
Woodlands. 49 West Princes Street. Marion Gilchrist's house. 2020.

Square Mile of Murder. Location of murder top circle.

In December 1908, Marion Gilchrist, aged 83 years, was beaten to death in a robbery at West Princes Street, Glasgow, after her maid, Helen Lambie, had popped out for ten minutes. Although she had jewellery worth £3,000 (equivalent to £310,000 in 2025) hidden in her wardrobe, the robber, who was disturbed by a neighbour, had rifled through Mrs. Gilchrist's personal papers and taken only a brooch. Slater left for New York five days after the murder and came under suspicion, as apparently before the murder, a caller to Gilchrist's house had been looking for someone called "Anderson", and Slater had coincidentally previously been seen trying to sell a pawn ticket for a brooch.

The police soon realised that the pawn ticket was for an entirely different brooch and a false lead, but, notwithstanding the contradictory evidence, still applied for Slater's extradition. While Slater was advised that the application would probably fail anyway, he voluntarily returned to Scotland to clear his name of the alleged crime.

== Trial of Oscar Slater ==
At his trial presided over by Lord Guthrie, whose summing up was highly prejudicial, defence witnesses provided Slater with an alibi and confirmed that he had announced his trip to America long before the date of Mrs. Gilchrist's murder. He was convicted by a majority of nine to six (five "not proven" and one "not guilty"). In May 1909, he was sentenced to death, with the execution to take place before the end of that month. However, Slater's lawyers organised a petition that was signed by 20,000 people, and the Secretary of State for Scotland, Lord Pentland, subsequently issued a conditional pardon and commuted the sentence to life imprisonment. Slater would serve nineteen years at Peterhead Prison.

The following year, the Scottish lawyer and amateur criminologist William Roughead published his Trial of Oscar Slater, highlighting flaws in the prosecution. The circumstantial evidence against Slater included his alleged "flight from justice". The prosecution's evidence and witnesses identifying Slater as a suspect, including maid Helen Lambie, were also criticized as fleeting and otherwise unreliable, prejudiced, tainted, or coached. In particular, Slater was conspicuously contrasted with nine off-duty policemen in a rigged identification parade.

Slater received little support from within Glasgow's Jewish community, which was attributed towards concerns around drawing attention to Slater's Jewish identity in light of the case's notoriety and the potential for a rise in antisemitism as a result.

== The Case of Oscar Slater ==
Roughead's book convinced many of Slater's innocence; influential people included Sir Edward Marshall Hall; Ramsay MacDonald; (eventually) Viscount Buckmaster; and Sir Arthur Conan Doyle. In 1912, Conan Doyle published The Case of Oscar Slater, a plea for a full pardon for Slater.. His papers connected with the case are held by Glasgow City Archives in the Mitchell Library.

In 1914, Thomas McKinnon Wood ordered a Private Inquiry into the case. A detective in the case, John Thomson Trench, provided information which had allegedly been deliberately concealed from the trial by the police. The Inquiry found that the conviction was sound, and instead, Trench was dismissed from the force and prosecuted on trumped-up charges from which he was eventually acquitted.

== Criminal Appeal (Scotland) Act 1927 ==
Criminal Appeal (Scotland) Act 1927 (Note: Section 2.)
- Act of Parliament
- Parliament of the United Kingdom
- Long title: An Act to amend the provisions of the Criminal Appeal (Scotland) Act, 1926, with regard to the power of the Secretary of State to refer a case, or any point arising therein, to the High Court of Justiciary.
- Citation: 17 & 18 Geo. 5. c. 26
- Territorial extent: United Kingdom

Dates
- Royal assent: 22 December 1927
- Commencement: 22 December 1927 (Note: The Acts of Parliament (Commencement) Act 1793.)
- Repealed: 16 June 1977

Other legislation
- Amends: Criminal Appeal (Scotland) Act 1926
- Repealed by: Statute Law (Repeals) Act 1977

Status: Repealed

Text of statute as originally enacted

1927 saw the publication of The Truth about Oscar Slater by William Park. The contents of the book led the Solicitor General for Scotland, Alexander Munro MacRobert, to conclude that it was no longer proven that Slater was guilty.

The Criminal Appeal (Scotland) Act 1927 (17 & 18 Geo. 5. c. 26) was passed to extend the jurisdiction of the then recently established Scottish Court of Criminal Appeal to convictions before the original shut-off date of 1926. Slater's conviction was quashed in July 1928 on the grounds that Lord Guthrie had failed to direct the jury about the irrelevance of allegations relating to Slater's previous character.

== Aftermath ==
Detective-Lieutenant Trench died in 1919, aged fifty, and never lived to see justice done.

After serving an almost two-decades long prison sentence of hard labour, Slater received only £6,000 (2019: £254,370) in compensation. He met his most famous advocate, Sir Arthur Conan Doyle, only once in-person; they had a public falling out when Conan Doyle demanded he "be a gentleman" and pay his supporters back for legal fees, which Slater did not.

In the 1930s, Slater married a local Scottish woman of German descent thirty years his junior and settled in the seaside town of Ayr where he repaired and sold antiques. He also returned to using his birth name surname. As an enemy alien (born German), Slater and his wife were interned for a brief time at the start of World War II, though Slater had long since lost his German citizenship due to his imprisonment and never returned to Germany. Most of Slater's surviving family, including his two sisters, ultimately were murdered in the Holocaust.

He died in Ayr in 1948 of natural causes.

More recently, the Slater case has been revisited by several scholars and writers.

== Legacy ==
The lessons of the Slater miscarriage were considered, as late as 1976, by the Devlin Committee review on the limitations of identity parades.

As a result of controversy around the Slater Case and its aftermath, Scotland created the Scottish Court of Criminal Appeal (see above).

In Glasgow rhyming slang, See you "Oscar" rhymes Slater with later, although the expression has long been out of use.

The murder of Marion Gilchrist remains unsolved, but no additional charges have ever been made.

== See also ==
- List of miscarriage of justice cases
