= Lynchat =

Lynchat: Scottish Gaelic: Lainn a' Chait
- Location within the Badenoch and Strathspey area
- OS grid reference: NH784018
- Council area: Highland
- Country: Scotland
- Sovereign state: United Kingdom
- Post town: Kingussie
- Postcode district: PH21 1
- Police: Scotland
- Fire: Scottish
- Ambulance: Scottish

Lynchat (Scottish Gaelic: Lainn a' Chait) is a small residential settlement, situated 2 miles northeast of Kingussie in Inverness-shire, Scottish Highlands and is in the Scottish council area of Highland.

The River Spey which rises in Loch Insh and the Insh Marshes located 1–2 miles south and east of the settlement, passes to the south. The main A9 road passes to the north of Lynchat.

== History ==
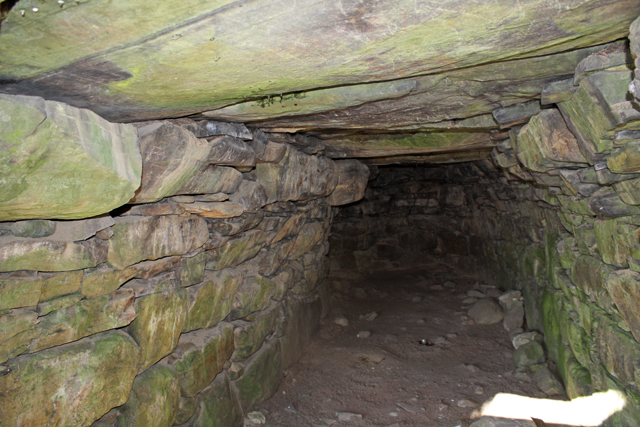
Raitts Cave

A post-mediaeval township, of which only indistinct traces now remain, existed here before the construction of the 18th-century military road that passed to that north of the settlement. Raitts Cave, (57.09211°N 4.02050°W), situated about 560 metres (610 yd) to the north-west, is a U-shaped souterrain probably constructed in about 100-400 CE for purposes of ritual, defence or storage. It is one of the best-preserved examples of such a structure in northern Scotland. It is a scheduled monument.

In 1830 a marble monument commemorating the poet James Macpherson, a benefactor to the area following forced clearances of local tenants, was erected to the northeast of the settlement (57.09316°N 4.00209°W).
