= Devlin Committee =

UK committee based on the Devlin report of 1976

The Devlin Committee was a UK committee based on the Devlin report of 1976, which looked at a number of criminal cases in order to draw conclusions on the method of visual identification of suspects. The committee was established to follow on from the investigations into the wrongful accusation of Adolf Beck by the Court of Appeal of England and Wales in 1907. The Devlin report submitted to the committee was made after a number of cases where identity parades led to the mis-identification of a suspect. These included Adolf Beck, Oscar Slater, Luke Dougherty and Laszlo Virag, cases ranging from 1908 to 1972.

Although the report uncovered a number of cases where innocent individuals were wrongly convicted, particularly in the case of Laszlo Virag in 1969, who was identified by 8 witnesses despite a plausible alibi, and Luke Dougherty who was picked by 2 witnesses but later cleared under similar circumstances. While the Devlin committee did rule that many witnesses overstated their ability to single out the right person, Professor Glanville Williams commented on the report that:

Neither the Beck case at the turn of the century nor the many miscarriages of justice since then have sufficiently impressed those concerned with criminal justice of the dangers of identification evidence. To mention some of the instances in late years: three occurred alone in the space of a few months in 1967–68. A memorandum of the National Council of Civil Liberties published in 1968 gave details of 15 cases from 1966 onwards; in most of these a person was convicted on identification evidence and the mistake was either established or very likely; in a few of them the defendant had not gone beyond being committed for trial when by a happy accident the mistake was discovered.

The Devlin committee and its actions were highlighted in the media more recently, in 2005, following the shooting of Jean Charles de Menezes and the rapid growth of an eye-witness reports that were later found to be exaggerated or false.

A previous Devlin Committee was appointed by the Ministry of Labour in October 1964 to look into disputes, decasualisation and dissension in the port transport industry. It reported in July 1965. Both committees were chaired by the Law Lord Patrick Devlin, Baron Devlin, hence the name.
