= William Roughead =

Scottish lawyer and amateur criminologist

William N. Roughead
- Born: February 1870; Edinburgh, Scotland
- Died: May 1952 (aged 82)

William Roughead (pronounced Rock-heed) (1870–1952) was a Scottish lawyer and amateur criminologist, as well as an editor and essayist on "matters criminous". He was an important early practitioner of the modern "true crime" literary genre.

== Career ==
Roughead held the title of Writer to Her Majesty's Signet as a Scottish solicitor. As the years progressed, Roughead practised law less and increasingly plied a trade as an unofficial historian of crime. He marks this transition from the year 1889, when at the age of nineteen, he skipped his apprentice work at the law firm of Maclaren and Traquair to attend the trial of Jessie King, the murderous baby-farmer of Stockbridge (an experience he described in his essay "My First Murder: Featuring Jessie King", In Queer Street, 1932). For roughly the next six decades, Roughead attended almost every murder trial of any importance at the High Court of Justiciary. These experiences provided the material he would submit for publication in the Juridical Review, a monthly Scottish legal journal; in later years, he would collect his contributions to the Juridical Review as well as much new material into several anthologies of essays.

His first collection was published in 1913 under the title Twelve Scots Trials, containing a dozen "adventures in criminal biography". The collection included among its twelve cases two notable trials, that of Katharine Nairn and John Watson Laurie, which Roughead was to revisit in more detail later in his career. The title of his first collection apparently was a mild disappointment to Roughead, stating in his "Personal Preface" to his third collection, Glengarry's Way and Other Studies, that "...I have always considered that my venture suffered in its baptism...of those three fateful words two at least were unhappily chosen. 'Scots' tended to arouse hereditary prejudice...'Trials' suggested to the lay mind either the bloomless technicalities of law reports or the raw and ribald obscenities of the baser press." He ended his lament upon his title with characteristic humour, "Had they been a 'baker's dozen' the game would have been up indeed."

Following the tangled web of the publication of those essays can present a real challenge to Roughead's readers. His early collections, published by William Hodge of Edinburgh, follow a more direct path, from appearing in the Juridical Review to being collected in anthologies, often titled with the leading essay. When he began to have a wider audience in the United States, his studies in crime were printed and reprinted in a series of overlapping anthologies, generally titled on variants of the word "murder": Mainly Murder, The Enjoyment of Murder, Murder and More Murder, The Murderer's Companion, The Art of Murder and Nothing But Murder. The American public eagerly embraced Roughead's dry humour as well as his fascination with criminals who looked and sounded exactly like us but who inhabited a parallel dark and rarefied nether world. This was a reading audience who were being introduced to the masters of hard-boiled pulp fiction, authors who, as Raymond Chandler said, were "...giving murder back to the kind of people that commit it for reasons, not just to provide a corpse." As Alexander Woollcott noted, in an introduction to a Reader's Club edition of Roughead, even US President Franklin D. Roosevelt had a special shelf just outside the Oval Office, labelled "The President's Shelf", with the "rarest of brews" being Roosevelt's personal selection of Roughead.

Roughead was also one of many editors of a series of trial accounts called Notable Scottish Trials, also published by William Hodge and Company. His first contribution to the Scottish trial series was the trial of Dr. Pritchard, the notorious Glasgow poisoner. He was later to contribute another nine trial accounts, including some of the more notorious criminal cases of old and new Edinburgh.

In the early twenties, Roughead began a correspondence with American crime writer, Edmund Pearson, and a professional exchange of letters blossomed into a warm friendship for the next fifteen years. When Pearson published his landmark Studies in Murder in 1924, Roughead's praise for the work was enthusiastic, especially for Pearson's treatment of America's most famous murderess, Lizzie Borden of Fall River. In a letter to Pearson, Roughead said, "...honestly, I never enjoyed a case more than Miss Lizzie's. It is as unique as it is perfect: a flawless work of art...."

== Assessment ==
According to Joyce Carol Oates: "Roughead's influence was enormous, and since his time "true crime" has become a crowded, flourishing field, though few writers of distinction have been drawn to it.... Roughead, much admired by Henry James, wrote in a style that combined intelligence, witty scepticism, and a flair for old-fashioned storytelling and moralising; his accounts of murder cases and trials have the advantage of being concise and pointed, like folk tales." Perhaps Roughead's greatest achievement was his analysis of Oscar Slater's trial for the murder of the Glasgow spinster Marion Gilchrist in 1908. Roughead assisted Arthur Conan Doyle, Craigie Aitchison and William Park for nearly 20 years exposing weaknesses in the Crown's case and indeed he was cited as a witness in the 1928 appeal.

== Books ==
- Rhyme without Reason (1901)
- Trial of Dr. Pritchard (1906) Notable Trials series
- Trial of Captain Porteous (1909) Notable Trials series
- Bibliography of the Porteous Mob (1909)
- Trial of Oscar Slater (1910 & 2nd ed. rev. 1925) Notable Trials series
- Trial of Mrs. M'Lachlan (1911) Notable Trials series
- Twelve Scots Trials (1913)
- Trial of Deacon Brodie (1914) Notable Trials series
- Trial of Mary Blandy (1914) Notable Trials series
- Burke and Hare (1921) Notable Trials series
- Glengarry's Way and Other Studies (1922)
- The Fatal Countess and Other Studies (1924)
- A Rich Man and Other Stories (1925)
- Trial of Jessie M'Lachlan (2d ed. rev. 1925 & 3d ed. 1950) Notable Trials series
- The Rebel Earl and Other Studies (1926)
- The Trial of Katharine Nairn (1926) Notable Trials series
- Malice Domestic (1928)
- The Evil that Men Do (1929)
- Trial of John Donald Merrett (1929) Notable Trials series
- Bad Companions (1930)
- What Is Your Verdict? (1931)
- In Queer Street (1932)
- The Trial of John Watson Laurie (the Arran Murder) (1932) Notable Trials series
- Rogues Walk Here (1934)
- Famous Crimes (1935)
- Knave's Looking Glass (1935)
- The Riddle of the Ruthvens and Other Studies (1936)
- Mainly Murder. London: Cassell and Company Ltd., 1937
- The Enjoyment of Murder (1938)
- The Seamy Side (1938)
- Murder and More Murder (1939)
- Neck or Nothing (1939)
- The Murderer's Companion (1941)
- Reprobates Revisited (1941)
- The Art of Murder (1943)
- Nothing But Murder (1946)
- Classic Crimes: A Selection from the Works of William Roughead (1951)
- Tales of the Criminous: A Selection from the Works of William Roughead (1956)

== Family ==
His son, also William Roughead, was a Scotland international rugby union player.
