= Neil Carmichael, Baron Carmichael of Kelvingrove =

Scottish politician

The Right Honourable The Lord Carmichael of Kelvingrove

Member of the House of Lords
- Lord Temporal
- Life peerage 10 October 1983 – 19 July 2001

Personal details
- Born: Neil George Carmichael; 10 October 1921
- Died: 19 July 2001 (aged 79)
- Party: Labour
- Education: Royal College of Science and Technology
- Occupation: engineer and a councillor on Glasgow Town Council

Neil George Carmichael, Baron Carmichael of Kelvingrove (10 October 1921 – 19 July 2001) was a Scottish politician. He was a Labour Member of Parliament (MP) in Glasgow from 1962 to 1983.

== Early life ==
Carmichael was the son of James Carmichael MP and the grandson of George Carmichael, a founder member of the Independent Labour Party (ILP). He was educated at Eastbank Academy, in Shettleston, and the Royal College of Science and Technology, Glasgow. In the Second World War he was a conscientious objector. He was an engineer and a councillor on Glasgow Town Council.

== Parliamentary career ==
Carmichael was elected as MP for Glasgow Woodside at a by-election in November 1962 (maiden speech 17 December 1962 (669 c930-4)), and held the seat until the constituency was abolished at the February 1974 election, when he was elected for Glasgow Kelvingrove. He served in Harold Wilson's governments in various positions including Parliamentary Secretary for Transport, Parliamentary Secretary for Technology and later Under Secretary for Environment.

In 1980 he introduced a private member's bill to make seatbelts compulsory, but it was "talked out" during the report stage

For the 1983 general election his constituency was abolished and merged with Glasgow Hillhead which had been won in a by-election by the former Labour Deputy Leader Roy Jenkins for the SDP. The two incumbent MPs fought each other, with Jenkins, now the SDP's leader, winning by 1,164 votes.

=== Ministerial posts ===
He held the following ministerial posts during his time in the House of Commons:

- Parliamentary Secretary, Ministry of Transport (1967–1969)
- Parliamentary Secretary, Ministry of Technology (1969–1970)
- Parliamentary Under-Secretary, Department of the Environment (1974–1975)
- Parliamentary Under-Secretary, Department of Industry (1975–1976)

=== House of Lords ===
Carmichael was created a Life peer as Baron Carmichael of Kelvingrove, of Camlachie in the District of the City of Glasgow on 10 October 1983. During his time in the House of Lords he became Labour's spokesman on transport and Scotland.

== Death ==
Carmichael died following a stroke after a long illness, according to Lord Graham of Edmonton.

== Personal life ==
He was married to Kay Carmichael, a Scottish political activist; from 1948 until they divorced in 1987. Together they had one daughter.

Parliament of the United Kingdom
Preceded by William Grant	Member of Parliament for Glasgow Woodside; 1962–February 1974	constituency abolished
Preceded by Dr Maurice Miller	Member of Parliament for Glasgow Kelvingrove; February 1974–1983	constituency abolished
