= James Reid, Baron Reid =

Scottish Unionist politician and judge (1890–1975)

The Right Honourable The Lord Reid CH PC QC
- Reid in 1941, by Walter Stoneman

Lord of Appeal in Ordinary
- In office 1948–1975

Lord Advocate
- In office 1941–1945
- Monarch: George VI
- Preceded by: Thomas Cooper
- Succeeded by: George Thomson

Solicitor General for Scotland
- In office 1936–1941
- Preceded by: Albert Russell
- Succeeded by: Sir David King Murray

Member of Parliament for Glasgow Hillhead
- In office 10 June 1937 – 6 October 1948
- Preceded by: Sir Robert Horne
- Succeeded by: Sir Thomas Galbraith

Member of Parliament for Stirling and Falkirk
- In office 27 October 1931 – 25 October 1935
- Preceded by: Hugh Murnin
- Succeeded by: Joseph Westwood

Personal details
- Born: 30 July 1890 Drem, Scotland
- Died: 29 March 1975 (aged 84) London, England
- Spouse: Esther Brierly (m. 1933)
- Education: Jesus College, Cambridge

Military service
- Branch/service: British Army
- Rank: Major
- Unit: Royal Scots
- Battles/wars: First World War

James Scott Cumberland Reid, Baron Reid, CH, PC, FRSE (30 July 1890 – 29 March 1975) was a Scottish Unionist politician and judge. His reputation is as one of the most outstanding judges of the 20th century.

== Life ==
He was born on 30 July 1890 in Drem, East Lothian, the son of James Reid, a Solicitor of the Supreme Courts (SSC), and his wife, Kate Scott. Educated at Edinburgh Academy, he then studied law at Jesus College, Cambridge, graduating BA in 1910 and LLB in 1911. He was admitted as an advocate in 1914.

He was commissioned into the 8th battalion Royal Scots in World War I and was seconded to the Machine Gun Corps in 1916, serving in Mesopotamia and reaching the rank of Major. He resigned his commission in 1921. He was appointed a King's Counsel in 1932.

He was Member of Parliament (MP) for Stirling and Falkirk from October 1931 until his defeat in November 1935, and for Glasgow Hillhead from June 1937 until September 1948.

He served as Solicitor General for Scotland from June 1936 until June 1941, and as Lord Advocate from June 1941 until July 1945, and was appointed a Privy Counsellor in 1941.

From 1945 to 1948 he was Dean of the Faculty of Advocates. In 1948 he was appointed as a Lord of Appeal in Ordinary and received a Law Life Peerage as Baron Reid, of Drem in East Lothian. He sat as a Lord of Appeal in Ordinary until 1975. He was one of very few people to be appointed a Law Lord straight from the Bar, without any intervening judicial experience.

Reid was appointed a Member of the Order of the Companions of Honour in 1967.

He died in London on 29 March 1975.

== Family ==
In 1933, he married Mrs Esther Mary Brierley (née Nelson), a widow.

They did not have any children.

== Cases decided ==
- Bonnington Castings Ltd v Wardlaw [1956] AC 613, [1956] 2 WLR 707, [1956] 1 All ER 615
- Overseas Tankship (UK) Ltd v Morts Dock and Engineering Co Ltd aka (Wagon Mound (No. 1)) [1961] 1 All ER 404
- Scruttons Ltd v Midland Silicones Ltd [1962] AC 446
- Shaw v DPP [1962] AC 220
- Ridge v Baldwin, [1964] AC 40
- Rookes v. Barnard [1964] AC 1129
- Beswick v Beswick [1968] AC 58
- Madzimbamuto v Lardner-Burke, [1969] 1 AC 645
- Dorset Yacht Co Ltd v Home Office [1970] AC 1004
- McGhee v National Coal Board [1972] 3 All ER 1008
- Knuller v. DPP [1973] A.C. 435
- Norwich Pharmacal Co. v Customs and Excise Commissioners [1974] AC 133

== Selected judgments ==
In Shaw v DPP, (1961) UKHL 1 rendered on 4 May 1961, Reid said,

I shall not examine the authorities because I think that they establish that it is an indictable offence to say or do or exhibit anything in public which outrages public decency, whether or not it also tends to corrupt and deprave those who see or hear it. In my view it is open to a jury to hold that a public invitation to indulge in sexual perversion does so outrage public decency as to be a punishable offence. If the jury in this case had been properly directed they might well have found the accused guilty for this reason. And the offence would be the same whether the invitation was made by an individual or by several people acting in concert. But it appears to me to be impossible to say the same with regard to ordinary prostitution. The common law has never treated the appearance of a prostitute in public as an indictable offence however obvious her purpose might be, and an Act of Parliament has been found necessary to stop the nuisance of prostitutes parading in the public street.

In the same case, he went on to say:

Even if there is still a vestigial power of this kind it ought not, in my view, to be used unless there appears to be general agreement that the offence to which it is applied ought to be criminal if committed by an individual. Notoriously there are wide differences of opinion today as to how far the law ought to punish immoral acts which are not done in the face of the public. Some think that the law already goes too far, some that it does not go far enough. Parliament is the proper place, and I am firmly of opinion the only proper place, to settle that. When there is sufficient support from public opinion, Parliament does not hesitate to intervene. Where Parliament fears to tread it is not for the courts to rush in.

Parliament of the United Kingdom
Preceded by Hugh Murnin	Member of Parliament for Stirling and Falkirk; 1931–1935	Succeeded by Joseph Westwood
Preceded by Sir Robert Horne	Member of Parliament for Glasgow Hillhead; 1937–1948	Succeeded by Tam Galbraith
Legal offices
Preceded by Albert Russell	Solicitor General for Scotland; 1936–1941	Succeeded by Sir David King Murray
Preceded by Thomas Cooper	Lord Advocate; 1941–1945	Succeeded by George Thomson
