= Edinburgh East by-election =

Edinburgh East by-election may refer to:

- 1899 Edinburgh East by-election
- 1909 Edinburgh East by-election
- 1912 Edinburgh East by-election
- 1945 Edinburgh East by-election
- 1947 Edinburgh East by-election
- 1954 Edinburgh East by-election
