= Edinburgh East =

UK Parliament constituency (1885–1997; 2005–2024)

Coordinates: 55.94415°N 3.1414°W

- Former burgh constituency for the House of Commons
- Boundaries from 2005 to 2024
- Location of Edinburgh East within Scotland
- Subdivision: City of Edinburgh
- Major settlements: Brunstane, Newcraighall, Duddingston, Portobello, Joppa, Craigmillar

2005–2024
- Seats: One
- Created from: Edinburgh East & Musselburgh; Edinburgh Central; Edinburgh South

1885–1997
- Seats: One
- Type of constituency: Burgh constituency
- Created from: Edinburgh

Edinburgh East was a burgh constituency of the House of Commons of the Parliament of the United Kingdom. It elected one Member of Parliament (MP) by the first past the post system of election.

It existed from 1885 to 1997 and from 2005 to 2024.

Further to the completion of the 2023 Periodic Review of Westminster constituencies, the seat was expanded to include most of the town of Musselburgh. As a consequence, it reverted to the name of Edinburgh East and Musselburgh used from 1997 to 2005.

== Boundaries ==
Edinburgh East was one of five constituencies covering the City of Edinburgh council area. All were entirely within the city council area. Prior to the 2005 general election, the city area was covered by six constituencies, with Edinburgh East and Musselburgh straddling the boundary with the East Lothian council area.

1885–1918: The municipal wards of Broughton, Calton, and Canongate of the burgh of Edinburgh, and so much of St. Leonard's ward as lies to the north of a line drawn along the centres of East and West Richmond Streets.

1918–1950: The burgh of Musselburgh and the Canongate and Portobello municipal wards of the county of the city of Edinburgh.

1950–1955: The burgh of Musselburgh and the Craigentinny, Craigmillar and Portobello wards (as constituted by the Local Government (Scotland) (Edinburgh Wards) Order 1948, SI 1948/1138) of the county of the city of Edinburgh.

1955–1974: The burgh of Musselburgh and the Craigentinny, Portobello and Craigmillar (with the exception of the area added by the Edinburgh Corporation Order Confirmation Act 1954).

1974–1983: The burgh of Musselburgh and the Craigmillar, Craigentinny and Portobello wards of the county of the city of Edinburgh.

1983–1997: Electoral divisions 22 (Calton/Lochend), 30 (Willowbrae/Mountcastle), 31 (Portobello/Milton) and 39 (Niddrie/Craigmillar) and ward 30 (Craigentinny) of the City of Edinburgh.

2005–2024: The City of Edinburgh wards of Tollcross, Southside, Holyrood, Meadowbank, Mountcastle, Leith Links, Restalrig, Portobello, Milton, Prestonfield, Craigmillar, and Duddingston.

The Edinburgh East constituency, as defined in 2005, consisted of areas formerly within the constituencies of Edinburgh East and Musselburgh, Edinburgh Central and Edinburgh South. It was largely a replacement for Edinburgh East and Musselburgh. Scottish Parliament constituencies retained the names and boundaries of the older Westminster constituencies.

As implied by the name, Edinburgh East covered an eastern portion of the City of Edinburgh council area, although it extended well into the city centre. It included the areas of Craigmillar, Duddingston, Holyrood, Leith Links, Meadowbank, Milton, Mountcastle, Portobello, Prestonfield, Restalrig, Southside and Tollcross.

The constituency was predominantly urban.

The constituency of the 1885 to 1997 period was created when the Edinburgh constituency was abolished, in favour of four new constituencies: Edinburgh East, Edinburgh Central, Edinburgh South and Edinburgh West. Edinburgh Central was abolished in 2005. The South and West constituencies continue in use, with altered boundaries.

== Constituency profile ==
The seat as it existed from 2005 to 2024 covered the historic Old Town including notable buildings such as Edinburgh Castle, Holyrood Palace, the Royal Mile, St Giles' Cathedral and the Scottish Parliament building, as well as Portobello Beach. The constituency also housed the University of Edinburgh and had a significant student population. Towards the south and east it also included some of Edinburgh's more deprived areas such as the Craigmillar housing estate.

On average, residents were slightly wealthier and healthier than the UK average.

== Members of Parliament ==
=== 1885–1918 ===
Election	Member	Party
1885	George Goschen	Independent Liberal
1886	George Goschen	Liberal Unionist
1886	Robert Wallace	Liberal
1899 by-election	Sir George McCrae	Liberal
1909 by-election	Sir James Gibson, Bt	Liberal
1912 by-election	James Hogge	Liberal
1918	Constituency redrawn: see Edinburgh North	

=== 1918–2024 ===
Election	Member	Party
1918	James Hogge	Liberal
1924	Thomas Drummond Shiels	Labour
1931	David Marshall Mason	Liberal
1935	Frederick Pethick-Lawrence	Labour
1945 by-election	George Reid Thomson	Labour
1947 by-election	John Wheatley	Labour
1954 by-election	George Willis	Labour
1970	Gavin Strang	Labour
1997	Constituency abolished: see Edinburgh East and Musselburgh	
2005	Gavin Strang	Labour
2010	Sheila Gilmore	Labour
2015	Tommy Sheppard	SNP
2024	Constituency abolished: see Edinburgh East and Musselburgh	

== Election results (2005–2024) ==
=== Elections in the 2010s ===
General election 2019: Edinburgh East
Party	Candidate	Votes	%	±%
SNP	Tommy Sheppard	23,165	48.4	▲5.9
Labour	Sheila Gilmore	12,748	26.7	▼8.0
Conservative	Eleanor Price	6,549	13.7	▼4.9
Liberal Democrats	Jill Reilly	3,289	6.9	▲2.7
Green	Claire Miller	2,064	4.3	New
Majority		10,417	21.7	▲13.9
Turnout		47,815	68.9	▲2.7
SNP hold		Swing	▲7.0	

General election 2017: Edinburgh East
Party	Candidate	Votes	%	±%
SNP	Tommy Sheppard	18,509	42.5	▼6.7
Labour	Patsy King	15,084	34.7	▲4.8
Conservative	Katie Mackie	8,081	18.6	▲8.7
Liberal Democrats	Tristan Gray	1,849	4.2	▲1.4
Majority		3,425	7.8	▼11.5
Turnout		43,622	66.2	▼3.9
SNP hold		Swing	▼5.7	

General election 2015: Edinburgh East
Party	Candidate	Votes	%	±%
SNP	Tommy Sheppard	23,188	49.2	▲28.8
Labour	Sheila Gilmore	14,082	29.9	▼13.5
Conservative	James McMordie	4,670	9.9	▼1.0
Green	Peter McColl	2,809	6.0	▲0.9
Liberal Democrats	Karen Utting	1,325	2.8	▼16.6
UKIP	Oliver Corbishley	898	1.9	New
TUSC	Ayesha Saleem	117	0.2	▼0.5
Majority		9,106	19.3	N/A
Turnout		47,089	70.1	▲4.7
SNP gain from Labour		Swing	▲21.1	

General election 2010: Edinburgh East
Party	Candidate	Votes	%	±%
Labour	Sheila Gilmore	17,314	43.4	▲3.4
SNP	George Kerevan	8,133	20.4	▲3.4
Liberal Democrats	Beverley Hope	7,751	19.4	▼5.0
Conservative	Martin Donald	4,358	10.9	▲0.6
Green	Robin Harper	2,035	5.1	▼0.6
TUSC	Gary Clark	274	0.7	New
Majority		9,181	23.0	▲7.4
Turnout		39,865	65.4	▲4.1
Labour hold		Swing	0.0	

=== Elections in the 2000s ===
General election 2005: Edinburgh East
Party	Candidate	Votes	%	±%
Labour	Gavin Strang	15,899	40.0	−9.7
Liberal Democrats	Gordon Mackenzie	9,697	24.4	+7.2
SNP	Stefan Tymkewycz	6,760	17.0	+0.6
Conservative	Mev Brown	4,093	10.3	−0.8
Green	Cara Gillespie	2,266	5.7	New
Scottish Socialist	Catriona Grant	868	2.2	−1.8
Death, Dungeons and Taxes Party	Brett Harris	89	0.2	New
Communist League	Peter Clifford	37	0.1	New
Majority		6,202	15.6	−16.9
Turnout		39,709	61.3	+8.5
Labour hold		Swing	−8.4	

== Election results (1918–1992) ==
=== Election in the 1990s ===
General election 1992: Edinburgh East
Party	Candidate	Votes	%	±%
Labour	Gavin Strang	15,446	45.7	−4.7
Conservative	Kenneth F. Ward	8,235	24.4	−0.3
SNP	Debin McKinney	6,225	18.4	+8.9
Liberal Democrats	Devin S. Scobie	3,432	10.2	−5.2
Green	Graeme W. Farmer	424	1.3	New
Majority		7,211	21.3	−4.6
Turnout		33,762	73.9	−0.2
Labour hold		Swing		

=== Elections in the 1980s ===
General election 1987: Edinburgh East
Party	Candidate	Votes	%	±%
Labour	Gavin Strang	18,257	50.4	+5.5
Conservative	John Renz	8,962	24.7	−3.9
Liberal	Judith Aitken	5,592	15.4	−5.6
SNP	Mungo Bovey	3,434	9.5	+4.0
Majority		9,295	25.7	+9.4
Turnout		36,245	74.1	+3.7
Labour hold		Swing		

General election 1983: Edinburgh East
Party	Candidate	Votes	%	±%
Labour	Gavin Strang	16,169	44.9	−7.6
Conservative	Paul Martin	10,303	28.6	−6.3
Liberal	Roderick Macleod	7,570	21.0	New
SNP	Paul Henderson Scott	1,976	5.5	−6.5
Majority		5,866	16.3	−3.9
Turnout		36,018	70.4	−5.7
Labour hold		Swing		

=== Elections in the 1970s ===
General election 1979: Edinburgh East
Party	Candidate	Votes	%	±%
Labour	Gavin Strang	23,477	53.69	
Conservative	G Campbell	14,660	33.52	
SNP	George C MacDougall	5,296	12.11	
Communist	Carol Downes	173	0.40	
Workers Revolutionary	Terry Brotherstone	124	0.28	New
Majority		8,817	20.17	
Turnout		43,730	76.10	
Labour hold		Swing		

General election October 1974: Edinburgh East
Party	Candidate	Votes	%	±%
Labour	Gavin Strang	19,669	44.92	
SNP	George C MacDougall	11,213	25.61	
Conservative	M Hogg	10,111	23.09	
Liberal	GN Dalzell	2,578	5.89	
Communist	Irene Swan	213	0.49	
Majority		8,456	19.31	
Turnout		43,784	76.20	
Labour hold		Swing		

General election February 1974: Edinburgh East
Party	Candidate	Votes	%	±%
Labour	Gavin Strang	20,163	43.66	
Conservative	DJ May	14,614	31.65	
SNP	George C MacDougall	7,128	15.44	
Liberal	John Melling	3,998	8.66	New
Communist	Irene Swan	274	0.59	
Majority		5,549	12.01	
Turnout		46,077	81.08	
Labour hold		Swing		

General election 1970: Edinburgh East
Party	Candidate	Votes	%	±%
Labour	Gavin Strang	22,171	51.87	
Conservative	Neil Gow	16,657	38.97	
SNP	Helen B Davidson	3,502	8.19	New
Communist	Irene Swan	413	0.97	New
Majority		5,514	12.90	
Turnout		42,743	74.42	
Labour hold		Swing		

=== Elections in the 1960s ===
General election 1966: Edinburgh East
Party	Candidate	Votes	%	±%
Labour	George Willis	25,423	60.48	
Conservative	Barry Henderson	16,614	39.52	
Majority		8,809	20.96	+8.66
Turnout		42,037	77.40	−3.55
Labour hold		Swing		

General election 1964: Edinburgh East
Party	Candidate	Votes	%	±%
Labour	George Willis	24,808	56.15	
Conservative	Robert L McEwen	19,376	43.85	
Majority		5,432	12.30	
Turnout		44,184	80.95	
Labour hold		Swing		

=== Elections in the 1950s ===
General election 1959: Edinburgh East
Party	Candidate	Votes	%	±%
Labour	George Willis	22,244	50.35	
Unionist	Earl of Dalkeith	21,932	49.65	
Majority		312	0.70	−4.34
Turnout		44,176	80.68	+5.31
Labour hold		Swing		

General election 1955: Edinburgh East
Party	Candidate	Votes	%	±%
Labour	George Willis	21,240	52.52	
Unionist	W Ian R Fraser	19,198	47.48	
Majority		2,042	5.04	
Turnout		40,438	75.37	
Labour hold		Swing		

1954 by-election: Edinburgh East
Party	Candidate	Votes	%	±%
Labour	George Willis	18,950	57.7	+3.6
Unionist	William Grant	13,922	42.4	−3.5
Majority		5,028	15.4	+7.2
Turnout		32,872	61.8	−22.0
Labour hold		Swing	-3.6	

General election 1951: Edinburgh East
Party	Candidate	Votes	%	±%
Labour	John Wheatley	25,201	54.08	
Unionist	William Grant	21,400	45.92	
Majority		3,801	8.16	
Turnout		46,601	83.82	+0.64
Labour hold		Swing		

General election 1950: Edinburgh East
Party	Candidate	Votes	%	±%
Labour	John Wheatley	24,072	53.22	
Unionist	Charles Donaldson	17,531	38.76	
Liberal	John Hope	3,632	8.03	
Majority		6,541	14.46	
Turnout		45,235	83.18	
Labour hold		Swing		

=== Elections in the 1940s ===
1947 by-election: Edinburgh East
Party	Candidate	Votes	%	±%
Labour	John Wheatley	16,906	50.5	−5.9
National Liberal (Conservative)	Duncan M. Matthews	11,490	34.4	−2.9
Liberal	John Junor	3,379	10.1	New
SNP	Mary Fraser Dott	1,682	5.0	−1.3
Majority		5,416	16.1	−3.0
Turnout		33,457		
Labour hold		Swing		

1945 by-election: Edinburgh East
Party	Candidate	Votes	%	±%
Labour	George Thomson	15,482	61.6	+5.2
Unionist	Tam Galbraith	9,665	38.4	+1.1
Majority		5,817	23.2	+4.1
Turnout		25,147		
Labour hold		Swing		

General election 1945: Edinburgh East
Party	Candidate	Votes	%	±%
Labour	Frederick Pethick-Lawrence	19,300	56.4	+13.2
Unionist	William Angus Sinclair	12,771	37.3	−2.3
SNP	Frederick C Yeaman	2,149	6.3	New
Majority		6,529	19.1	+15.5
Turnout		34,220	69.6	+1.0
Labour hold		Swing	+7.7	

General Election 1939–40:

Another general election was required to take place before the end of 1940. The political parties had been making preparations for an election to take place from 1939 and by the end of this year, the following candidates had been selected;

- Labour: Frederick Pethick-Lawrence
- Liberal:
- Unionist:

=== Elections in the 1930s ===
General election 1935: Edinburgh East
Party	Candidate	Votes	%	±%
Labour	Frederick Pethick-Lawrence	13,341	43.20	
Unionist	Minna Cowan	12,229	39.60	
Liberal	David Marshall Mason	5,313	17.20	
Majority		1,112	3.60	N/A
Turnout		30,883	68.63	−8.21
Labour gain from Liberal		Swing		

General election 1931: Edinburgh East
Party	Candidate	Votes	%	±%
Liberal	David Marshall Mason	17,372	56.98	
Labour	Drummond Shiels	10,244	33.60	
National (Scotland)	Rev Thomas Thomson Alexander	2,872	9.42	New
Majority		7,128	23.38	N/A
Turnout		30,488	76.84	
Liberal gain from Labour		Swing		

=== Elections in the 1920s ===
General election 1929: Edinburgh East
Party	Candidate	Votes	%	±%
Labour	Drummond Shiels	13,933	47.2	+2.9
Liberal	Thomas Pringle McDonald	8,687	29.4	+3.4
Unionist	Richard Cobden Thyne	6,889	23.3	−5.7
Majority		5,246	17.8	+2.5
Turnout		29,509	76.5	+2.3
Labour hold		Swing	+1.9	

General election 1924: Edinburgh East
Party	Candidate	Votes	%	±%
Labour	Drummond Shiels	9,330	44.3	New
Unionist	Charles Milne	6,105	29.0	−2.7
Liberal	James Hogge	5,625	26.7	–41.6
Majority		3,255	15.3	N/A
Turnout		20,190	74.2	+15.7
Labour gain from Liberal		Swing		

General election 1923: Edinburgh East
Party	Candidate	Votes	%	±%
Liberal	James Hogge	10,876	68.3	+8.5
Unionist	Charles John Morris Mancor	5,045	31.7	New
Majority		5,831	36.6	+17.0
Turnout		15,921	58.5	−7.5
Liberal hold		Swing		

General election 1922: Edinburgh East
Party	Candidate	Votes	%	±%
Liberal	James Hogge	10,551	59.8	−2.4
National Liberal	Sam McDonald	7,088	40.2	N/A
Majority		3,463	19.6	−4.8
Turnout		17,639	66.0	+13.5
Liberal hold		Swing	-2.4	

=== Elections in the 1910s ===
General election 1918: Edinburgh East
Party		Candidate	Votes	%
	Liberal	James Hogge	8,460	62.2
C	National Democratic	Alexander Balfour	5,136	37.8
Majority			3,324	24.4
Turnout			13,596	52.5
Registered electors			25,895	
	Liberal win (new boundaries)			
C indicates candidate endorsed by the coalition government.

== Election results (1885–1918) ==
=== Elections in the 1910s ===
James Hogge

1912 by-election: Edinburgh East
Party	Candidate	Votes	%	±%
Liberal	James Hogge	5,064	55.0	−8.0
Liberal Unionist	John Gordon Jameson	4,139	45.0	+8.0
Majority		925	10.0	−16.0
Turnout		9,203	73.7	−7.3
Registered electors		12,491		
Liberal hold		Swing	-8.0	

General election December 1910: Edinburgh East
Party	Candidate	Votes	%	±%
Liberal	James Gibson	6,436	63.0	+1.7
Conservative	R.M. Cameron	3,782	37.0	−1.7
Majority		2,654	26.0	+3.4
Turnout		10,218	81.0	−7.0
Registered electors		12,620		
Liberal hold		Swing	+1.7	

General election January 1910: Edinburgh East
Party	Candidate	Votes	%	±%
Liberal	James Gibson	6,760	61.3	−11.8
Liberal Unionist	Patrick Ford	4,273	38.7	+11.8
Majority		2,487	22.6	−23.6
Turnout		11,033	88.0	+9.9
Registered electors		12,544		
Liberal hold		Swing	−11.8	

=== Elections in the 1900s ===
James Gibson

1909 by-election: Edinburgh East
Party	Candidate	Votes	%	±%
Liberal	James Gibson	4,527	52.7	−20.4
Liberal Unionist	Patrick Ford	4,069	47.3	+20.4
Majority		458	5.4	−40.8
Turnout		8,596	73.4	−4.7
Registered electors		11,710		
Liberal hold		Swing	−20.4	

General election 1906: Edinburgh East
Party	Candidate	Votes	%	±%
Liberal	George McCrae	6,606	73.1	+14.6
Liberal Unionist	Rankine Dawson	2,432	26.9	−14.6
Majority		4,174	46.2	+29.2
Turnout		9,038	78.1	+8.9
Registered electors		11,572		
Liberal hold		Swing	+14.6	

General election 1900: Edinburgh East
Party	Candidate	Votes	%	±%
Liberal	George McCrae	4,461	58.5	+5.1
Liberal Unionist	R. Scott-Brown	3,170	41.5	−5.1
Majority		1,291	17.0	+10.2
Turnout		7,631	69.2	−0.2
Registered electors		11,025		
Liberal hold		Swing	+5.1	

=== Elections in the 1890s ===
1899 by-election: Edinburgh East
Party	Candidate	Votes	%	±%
Liberal	George McCrae	4,891	62.3	+8.9
Liberal Unionist	Harry G. Younger	2,961	37.7	−8.9
Majority		1,930	24.6	+17.8
Turnout		7,852	73.2	+3.8
Registered electors		10,730		
Liberal hold		Swing	+8.9	

Robert Wallace

General election 1895: Edinburgh East
Party	Candidate	Votes	%	±%
Liberal	Robert Wallace	3,499	53.4	−5.2
Liberal Unionist	Harry G. Younger	3,050	46.6	+5.2
Majority		449	6.8	−10.4
Turnout		6,549	69.4	−7.3
Registered electors		9,437		
Liberal hold		Swing	−5.2	

General election 1892: Edinburgh East
Party	Candidate	Votes	%	±%
Liberal	Robert Wallace	3,969	58.6	−3.5
Liberal Unionist	Ralph Wardlaw McLeod Fullarton	2,809	41.4	+3.5
Majority		1,160	17.2	−7.0
Turnout		6,778	76.7	−1.2
Registered electors		8,840		
Liberal hold		Swing	−3.5	

=== Elections in the 1880s ===
General election 1886: Edinburgh East
Party	Candidate	Votes	%	±%
Liberal	Robert Wallace	3,694	62.1	+31.3
Liberal Unionist	George Goschen	2,253	37.9	−31.3
Majority		1,441	24.2	N/A
Turnout		5,947	77.9	−4.1
Registered electors		7,639		
Liberal gain from Independent Liberal		Swing	+31.3	

General election 1885: Edinburgh East
Party	Candidate	Votes	%
Independent Liberal	George Goschen	4,337	69.2
Liberal	Benjamin Francis Conn Costelloe	1,929	30.8
Majority		2,408	38.4
Turnout		6,266	82.0
Registered electors		7,639	
Independent Liberal win (new seat)			

== See also ==
- Politics of Edinburgh
