= George McCrae (politician) =

British politician

George McCrae by fellow MP, John Benjamin Stone

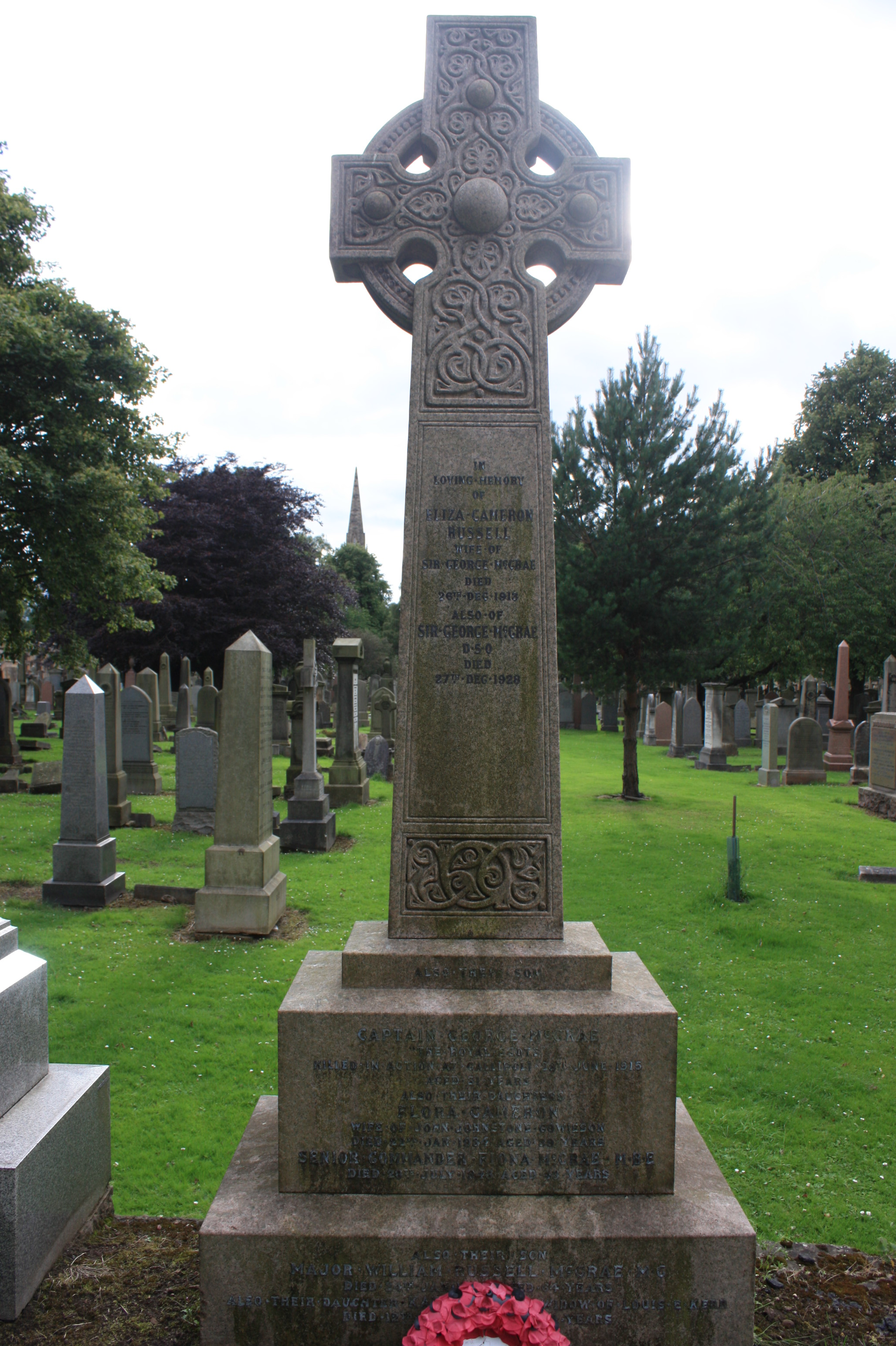
The grave of Sir George McCrae, Grange Cemetery, Edinburgh

Colonel Sir George McCrae DSO DL VD (28 August 1860 – 27 December 1928) was a Scottish textile merchant and Liberal Party politician. In Scotland he is best remembered for the creation of McCrae's Battalion, also known as the Second Edinburgh Pals Battalion and (officially) the 16th Battalion Royal Scots.

== Early life ==
Born in poor circumstances in Aberdeen, the illegitimate son of a housemaid, George McCrae was educated at the Lancasterian School, Edinburgh, having been raised by his maternal uncle. He never knew the identity of his father.

== Career ==
McCrae made his mark in the textile trade. He was described variously as a draper or a merchant hosier and mercer. He was knighted in 1908. In 1909, after a successful career as MP for Edinburgh East, he resigned from the House of Commons to take up a position in Scottish government service, accepting the appointment of Vice-President of the Scottish Local Government Board. From 1919 to 1922 he served as Chairman of the Scottish Board of Health.

== First World War service ==
McCrae was a former officer in the Volunteer Force, having been commanding officer of the 4th Volunteer Battalion, Royal Scots. In November 1914, during the enthusiasm for Kitchener's Army, he raised the 16th Battalion the Royal Scots. Among the first recruits were 16 members of the Hearts playing squad and staff. At the time Hearts were top of the Scottish League. The battalion was raised in Edinburgh and McCrae commanded it on the Western Front. After what was seen as the battalion's failure in action in August 1916, however, the divisional commander removed McCrae from command and assigned him to a reserve unit. He was judged to be popular with his men and personally brave but he was thought to have deficiencies as a leader, probably an unwillingness to incur casualties. Despite this judgment of their chief, McCrae's Own, as the battalion was known, had managed to penetrate deeper into the enemy line than any other regiment during the 'big push' of July 1916. A memorial cairn, the McCrae's Battalion Great War Memorial was erected in the French village of Contalmaison, a commune in the Somme department where many of its soldiers fell in 1916.

McCrae ended the war with the rank of colonel and was awarded the DSO.

== Politics ==
=== Local politics ===
McCrae became a member of Edinburgh Town Council in 1889. He was a City Treasurer and Chairman of the Finance Committee from 1891 to 1899 and also served as a Justice of the Peace in Edinburgh.

=== Edinburgh East by-election 1899 ===
In 1899, Robert Wallace, the sitting Liberal MP for Edinburgh East, died causing a Parliamentary by-election. McCrae was selected as Liberal candidate and held the seat over his Liberal Unionist challenger with a majority of 1,980 votes.

1899 Edinburgh East by-election
Party	Candidate	Votes	%	±%
Liberal	George McCrae	4,891	62.3	
Liberal Unionist	Harry G. Younger	2,961	37.7	
Majority		1,930	24.6	
Turnout			73.2	
Liberal hold		Swing		

=== 1900–1906 ===
McCrae fought Edinburgh East again in 1900, holding the seat with a majority of 1,291 and he successfully defended the constituency again at the 1906 general election, this time increasing his majority to 4,174.

General election 1900: Edinburgh East
Party	Candidate	Votes	%	±%
Liberal	George McCrae	4,461	58.5	−3.8
Liberal Unionist	R. Scott-Brown	3,170	41.5	+3.8
Majority		1,291	17.0	
Turnout			69.2	−4.0
Liberal hold		Swing	-3.8	

General election 1906: Edinburgh East
Party	Candidate	Votes	%	±%
Liberal	George McCrae	6,606	73.1	
Liberal Unionist	Rankin Dawson	2,432	26.9	
Majority		4,174	46.2	
Turnout			78.1	
Liberal hold		Swing		

In 1909 he resigned from the House of Commons to take up a position in Scottish government service, accepting the appointment of Vice-President of the Scottish Local Government Board.

=== 1917–1922 ===
McCrae sought a return to politics as a supporter of the Coalition Government of Lloyd George. In 1917, the Chief Liberal Whip of the Coalition government, Neil Primrose was standing down from parliament from his seat in England. If a seat could be found for McCrae in Scotland, then it was likely the position of Chief Whip would be offered to him. A vacancy occurred in Edinburgh South but on 19 April 1917, the executive committee of South Edinburgh Liberals, who remained loyal to H. H. Asquith, selected Sir Edward Parrott, the chairman of their Association and of the Edinburgh United Liberal Committee, as their candidate.

Although McCrae remained a supporter of Lloyd George, he was unable to secure a seat for the 1918 General Election in which he could be an endorsed candidate of the Coalition Government. Later, he fought the 1922 general election as a Lloyd George National Liberal at Edinburgh Central. In a straight fight with Labour he trailed sitting MP, William Graham by 3,505 votes.

General election 1922 : Edinburgh Central
Party	Candidate	Votes	%	±%
Labour	William Graham	12,876	57.9	+6.6
National Liberal	Sir George McCrae	9,371	42.1	−6.6
Majority		3,505	15.8	+13.2
Turnout			71.8	+26.6
Labour hold		Swing	+6.6	

=== 1923–1924 ===
Following Liberal re-union between the supporters of Asquith and Lloyd George, for the 1923 general election McCrae switched his attention to the Stirling and Falkirk Burghs. Standing as a Liberal, McCrae defeated the sitting Labour MP, Hugh Murnin by the narrow margin of 156 votes (which was less than 1% of the total poll). In 1924 he was unable to hold to his gain and Murnin won back the seat with a majority of 1,924 votes.

General election 1923: Stirling and Falkirk
Party	Candidate	Votes	%	±%
Liberal	Sir George McCrae	10,721	50.4	+3.7
Labour	Hugh Murnin	10,565	49.6	−3.7
Turnout			71.7	0.0
Majority		156	0.8	7.4
Liberal gain from Labour		Swing	+3.7	

General election 1924: Stirling and Falkirk
Party	Candidate	Votes	%	±%
Labour	Hugh Murnin	13,436	53.9	+4.3
Liberal	Sir George McCrae	11,512	46.1	−4.3
Turnout			81.6	
Majority		1,924	7.8	8.6
Labour gain from Liberal		Swing	+4.3	

== Death ==
In later life he lived at 61 Grange Loan, in the southern Edinburgh suburbs. The house was demolished to build flats in the 1990s.

McCrae died on 27 December 1928, aged 68 years. He is buried in Grange Cemetery in southern Edinburgh. The grave lies on the eastern path close to the main entrance.

== Family ==
In 1890 he married Eliza Cameron Russell (d. 1913).

His eldest son, Captain George McCrae, joined the Royal Scots but not in his father's battalion. He died at Gallipoli on 28 June 1915.

His daughter Fiona McCrae MBE (1905–1948) was a Senior Commander of the Auxiliary Territorial Service.

Another son Major William Russell McCrae won the Military Cross.

Parliament of the United Kingdom
Preceded by Robert Wallace	Member of Parliament for Edinburgh East; 1899 – 1909	Succeeded by Sir James Puckering Gibson
Preceded by Hugh Murnin	Member of Parliament for Stirling and Falkirk Burghs; 1923 – 1924	Succeeded by Hugh Murnin
