= 1947 Edinburgh East by-election =

UK parliamentary by-election

A 1947 by-election for the constituency of Edinburgh East in the United Kingdom House of Commons was held on 27 November 1947, caused by the appointment of the sitting Labour MP George Thomson as Lord Justice Clerk. The seat was retained by the Labour Party, with their candidate John Wheatley winning the seat.

== Result ==
Edinburgh East by-Election 1947
Party	Candidate	Votes	%	±%
Labour	John Wheatley	16,906	50.5	−5.9
Liberal National (Conservative)	Duncan M. Matthews	11,490	34.4	−2.9
Liberal	John Junor	3,379	10.1	New
SNP	Mary Dott	1,682	5.0	−1.3
Majority		5,416	16.1	−3.0
Turnout		33,457		
Labour hold		Swing		

== Previous elections ==
1945 Edinburgh East by-election
Party	Candidate	Votes	%	±%
Labour	George Thomson	15,482	61.6	+5.2
Conservative	Tam Galbraith	9,665	38.4	+1.1
Majority		5,817	23.2	+4.1
Turnout		25,147		
Labour hold		Swing		

General election 1945: Edinburgh East
Party	Candidate	Votes	%	±%
Labour	Frederick Pethick-Lawrence	19,300	56.4	+13.2
Conservative	William Angus Sinclair	12,771	37.3	−2.3
SNP	FC Yeaman	2,149	6.3	New
Majority		6,529	19.1	+15.5
Turnout		34,220	69.6	+1.0
Labour hold		Swing	+7.7	

== Bibliography ==
- Craig, F. W. S. (1983) [1969]. British parliamentary election results 1918-1949 (3rd edition ed.). Chichester: Parliamentary Research Services. ISBN 0-900178-06-X.
- Leigh Rayment's Historical List of MPs
- A Guide to Post-War Scottish By-elections to the UK Parliament
