= Gavin Strang =

Scottish politician (born 1943)

The Right Honourable Gavin Strang
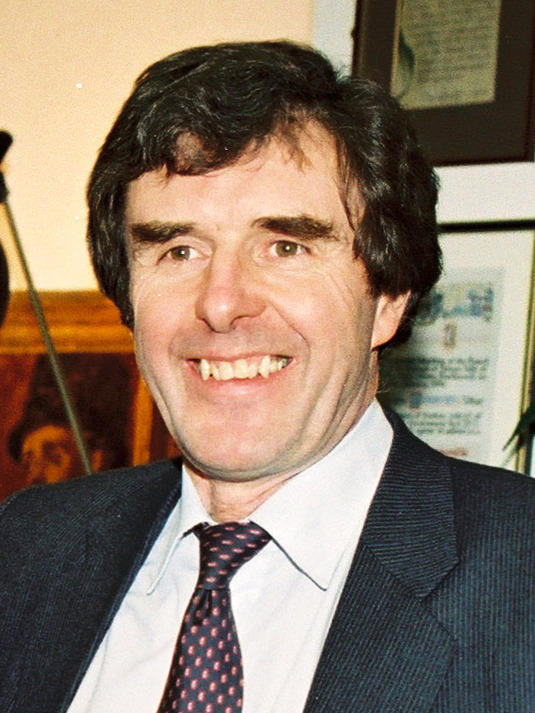
- Strang in 1997

Minister of State for Transport
- In office 2 May 1997 – 18 June 1998
- Prime Minister: Tony Blair
- Preceded by: John Watts
- Succeeded by: John Reid

Shadow Minister of Agriculture, Fisheries and Food
- In office 5 November 1992 – 2 May 1997
- Leader: John Smith; Tony Blair
- Preceded by: Ron Davies
- Succeeded by: Douglas Hogg

Parliamentary Under-Secretary of State for Agriculture, Fisheries and Food
- In office 18 October 1974 – 4 May 1979
- Prime Minister: Harold Wilson; James Callaghan
- Preceded by: Edward Bishop
- Succeeded by: Jerry Wiggin

Parliamentary Under-Secretary of State for Energy
- In office 7 March 1974 – 18 October 1974
- Prime Minister: Harold Wilson
- Preceded by: Peter Emery
- Succeeded by: Alex Eadie

Member of Parliament for Edinburgh East (Note: Known as Edinburgh East and Musselburgh between 1997 and 2005)
- In office 18 June 1970 – 12 April 2010
- Preceded by: George Willis
- Succeeded by: Sheila Gilmore

Personal details
- Born: Gavin Steel Strang; 10 July 1943 (age 83) Crieff, Perthshire, Scotland
- Party: Labour
- Education: University of Edinburgh; Churchill College, Cambridge

Gavin Steel Strang (born 10 July 1943) is a Scottish Labour Party politician who served as Member of Parliament (MP) for Edinburgh East (Note: Known as Edinburgh East and Musselburgh between 1997 and 2005) from 1970 until 2010. He served as a minister in the 1974–79 Labour government under Prime Ministers Harold Wilson and James Callaghan, as well as in the Cabinet under Tony Blair. By the time of his retirement at the 2010 general election, he was the longest-serving Scottish MP.

== Early life ==
A farmer's son, Strang grew up in Perthshire and attended the independent Morrison's Academy in Crieff. After gaining a BSc in Genetics from the University of Edinburgh in 1964, he gained a Diploma in Agricultural Science from Churchill College, Cambridge and a PhD in Agricultural Science from Edinburgh, presenting the thesis "The genetic aspects of litter productivity in British pigs". From 1966 to 1968, he was a member of the Tayside Economic Planning Consultative Group and, from 1968 to 1970, was a scientist at the Agricultural and Food Research Council and Animal Breeding Research Organisation in Edinburgh.

== Parliamentary career ==
Strang was first elected in the 1970 general election after Labour MP George Willis, who had represented Edinburgh East since a 1954 by-election, retired. Strang was a minister under Harold Wilson and James Callaghan, serving as Parliamentary Under Secretary of State at the Department of Energy in 1974 and then at the Ministry of Agriculture, Fisheries and Food until 1979. In 1990, he was the last person to ask Margaret Thatcher a question at Prime Minister's Questions, which he used to criticise her impact on communities and the poor during her time in office.

Following the 1997 general election, Strang was made Minister of State for Transport with a seat in the Cabinet. However, he was sacked in June 1998. After becoming a backbencher, he was sometimes critical of government policy. He campaigned against the privatisation of National Air Traffic Services, and on 31 October 2006, was one of twelve Labour MPs to back Plaid Cymru and the Scottish National Party's call for an inquiry into the Iraq War. From 1997 to the 2005 general election, his seat was named Edinburgh East and Musselburgh.

Strang was a member of the Tribune Group of MPs and the Campaign for Labour Party Democracy. He was Chairman of the All-Party Group for World Government and served on the Environment, Food and Rural Affairs Committee. In November 2007, he announced he would stand down at the next general election, but later reversed the decision. On 27 June 2008, Strang again changed his mind, and announced that he would indeed stand down at the next general election.

== Personal life ==
Strang married Bettina in 1973. They have a son, and he has two step sons. His wife has been the chair of the arm of the advocacy organisation Europa Donna. Bettina died in 2016.

== Notes ==
Parliament of the United Kingdom
Preceded by George Willis	Member of Parliament for Edinburgh East; 1970–1997	Constituency abolished
New constituency	Member of Parliament for Edinburgh East and Musselburgh; 1997–2005	Constituency abolished
New constituency	Member of Parliament for Edinburgh East; 2005–2010	Succeeded by Sheila Gilmore
Political offices
New creation	Minister of State for Transport; 1997–1998	Succeeded by John Reid
