= Chris Murray (British politician) =

British politician (born 1987/88)

The Honorable Chris Murray
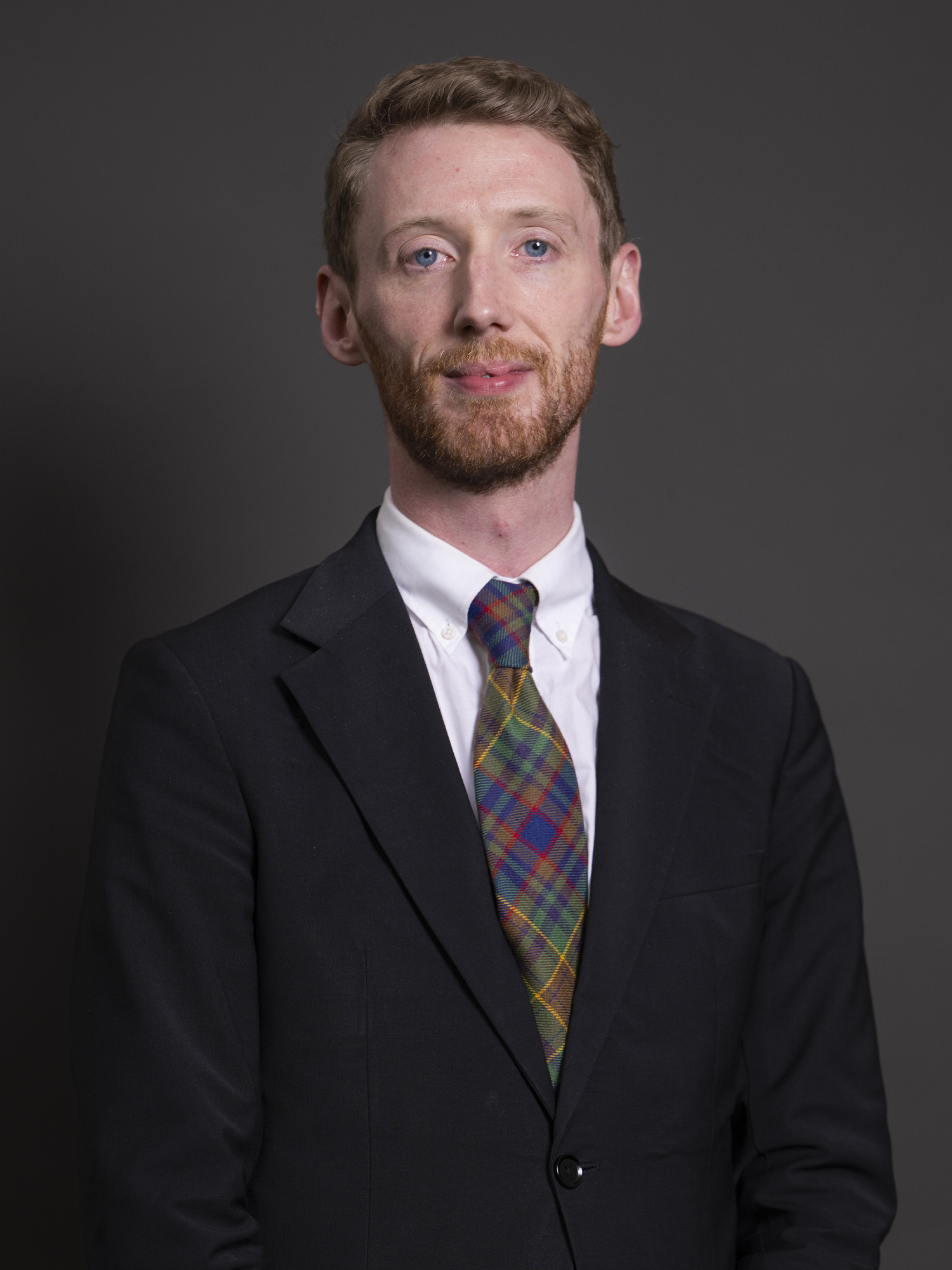
- Official portrait, 2025

Member of Parliament for Edinburgh East and Musselburgh
- Incumbent
- Assumed office 4 July 2024
- Preceded by: Tommy Sheppard
- Majority: 3,715 (8.1%)

Personal details
- Born: 1987 or 1988 (age 38–39) Glasgow, Scotland
- Party: Labour
- Parent: Margaret Curran (mother)
- Education: Oxford University; London School of Economics; Harvard University

Christopher Murray (born 1987 or 1988) is a Scottish Labour Party politician who has been the Member of Parliament (MP) for Edinburgh East and Musselburgh since 2024. He gained the seat from Tommy Sheppard, a member of the Scottish National Party. He sits on the Home Affairs Committee and serves as the UK Trade Envoy to France.

== Early life and education ==
Murray is the son of Scottish Labour politician Margaret Curran, Baroness Curran. He grew up in Glasgow and attended local state school, Shawlands Academy. He then studied French and German at the University of Oxford, later studying at the London School of Economics and attending Harvard University as a John F. Kennedy Fellow.

== Early career ==
Murray began his career as a political assistant to the Labour politician Harriet Harman, holding the role for two years. Harman later supported Murray's candidacy for Parliament and canvassed alongside him in Edinburgh. In 2014, he began working as an attaché at the Embassy of the United Kingdom in Paris. He stayed in the role for four years. He then served as an adviser on economic diplomacy at the OECD.

After leaving diplomacy, he worked as a senior government relations adviser for the charity Save the Children where he was part of the successful campaign to see UK's 0.7% commitment to aid enshrined in law.

Murray was then a research fellow at the IPPR think-tank, where he wrote papers on Migration policy, arguing in favour of boosting community integration through settlement changes, greater regional devolution and skills system reform

Murray also volunteered as chair of the Refugee Survival Trust charity and served on the advisory council of These Islands, a pro-UK thinktank.

Between May 2022 and his election in the summer of 2024, he was a policy manager for migration at the Convention of Scottish Local Authorities. In this role, Murray chaired the national body on protecting victims of Human Trafficking, set up the Hong Kong BNO hub in Scotland and published national policy guidance on supporting individuals and families with no recourse to public funds (NRPF)

== Member of Parliament ==
Murray was elected MP for the Edinburgh East and Musselburgh constituency at the 2024 general election.

In July 2024, Portobello beach in Murray's constituency was closed for a period after high levels of bacteria were present in the water. Murray raised this due to concerns from constituents which attributed this to sewage, and said that it was "unacceptable" that people were unable to swim due to pollution. It was later confirmed by SEPA not to be a pollution-related incident in that case. Murray has continued to raise the issue of unmonitored sewage outflows in Scottish waters, raising the issue in Parliament and in local press.

In October 2024, Murray convened a Westminster Hall debate in Parliament on the Edinburgh Festival's 75th Anniversary. Murray argued that 'It is important that Parliament recognises that other countries would give their eye teeth to have what Edinburgh has established in the past 75 years. We fail to polish the cultural jewels in our crown at our peril. We have an opportunity. The potential for the festivals to thrive is right in front of us. The Fringe is opening a new home in the Old Infirmary and the Dunard Centre will add a new modern concert hall to the city’s venues, but the support of public policy is necessary to achieve that.'

In March 2025, Murray raised the issue of Child Homelessness in Edinburgh at Prime Minister's Questions, after the charity Shelter reported that there were more children in temporary accommodation in Edinburgh than the whole of Wales.

In December 2025, Murray raised allegations that Rockstar Games had unfairly dismissed 30 to 40 employees for Union Activity, which the Independent Worker's Union of Great Britain argued constituted union busting. Murray raised the case at Prime Minister's Questions after meeting with the affected workers. In response, Prime Minister Keir Starmer said the firings were "deeply concerning" and said that the Government would investigate.

In 2025, Murray campaigned against Scottish Government budget cuts to the Scottish Fire and Rescue Service, including the proposed closure of the Marionville Fire Station in his constituency, arguing that 'Marionville should not be considered for closure. It covers an area with a rapidly increasing population – including some of Scotland’s most densely-populated communities, numerous new student housing blocks, and some of the capital’s iconic tourism and ceremonial locations. It simply doesn’t make sense.' Murray argued that, 'Cutting this station to move resources elsewhere would increase response times – which could be the difference between a bad incident, and a disastrous one.'

In January 2026, after leading a debate in parliament on UK-French relations, Murray was announced as the United Kingdom's Trade Envoy to France. Murray in advance of his election and as an MP has argued for closer relations with Europe. In Parliament, Murray made the case for increased cooperation with France on areas like scientific research, defence and cultural exchange, and strongly supports the UK's re-entry back into the Erasmus scheme.

Murray sat on the Employment Rights Bill Committee, where he scrutinised and amended worker's rights legislation. The new laws ban exploitative zero-hours contracts, end fire and rehire, and introduce basic employment rights from day one. Murray praised the UK Government reforms as the single biggest improvement in worker's rights in a generation.

== Home Affairs Committee Work ==
Chris Murray was elected to the Home Affairs Select Committee in October 2024. Murray has scrutinised the bosses of outsourced companies like Serco Clearsprings and Mears, who were given contracts to run asylum accommodation in hotels by the last Conservative Government. Murray criticised the deals, pointing out that while these companies were given lucrative contracts they were providing unsuitable accommodation for people seeking asylum, as well as providing a bad deal for the taxpayer.

In October 2025, on Channel 4 News, Murray described the Conservative policy of Asylum Hotel use as 'a total rip-off', and 'an appalling public procurement disaster'. Murray said he supports the UK Government policy of closing these hotels and moving asylum-seekers to appropriate accommodation, alongside speeding up Home Office decision-making so that thousands were no longer stuck on year long waiting lists.

Murray has raised the issue of Asylum Accommodation contracts in parliament, where he argued that 'The previous Government wasted a scandalous amount of public money on asylum accommodation. For example, in Northeye, they paid double what the previous owners had paid, without checking that the building did not have asbestos and contaminated ground, and in the end it could not be used.'

In a February 2025 debate on Border Security, Murray said 'People want to be compassionate. They do not want to see people drown. Most of all people want to see the system managed. It has to be firm and fair, and it has to be both.' In response, commentator and migration policy researcher, Sunder Katwala, described Murray as a key voice of both 'compassion and control' in the UK Immigration debate.

In Parliament, Murray has called for increased multi-annual funding settlements to tackle Violence against Women and Girls, and In July 2025, during a House of Commons statement on child sexual exploitation and grooming gangs, Murray welcomed the Government's announcement of a national inquiry and highlighted the need for cross-border cooperation between authorities in England and Scotland. Referring to the Scottish Government's review of grooming gangs and the findings of Alexis Jay, he noted concerns about the scale of child sexual exploitation in Scotland and drew on his previous work combating human trafficking to emphasise that children could be trafficked across the UK for abuse. Murray called for the inquiry to work closely with Scottish counterparts and for the Home Office to support cross-border collaboration.

Murray, has called for further cooperation between the UK and the EU, and in particular with the French government, to combat people smuggling human trafficking gangs in the English Channel. Murray stated in November 2025 on Radio, that "There is nothing progressive about an asylum system that leaves people placing their lives in the hands of people smugglers" and that 'As a progressive government, we have a moral imperative to get to grips with the moral dysfunction in the asylum system, and fix it.'

Murray has expressed support for government proposals to establish additional safe and legal routes for refugees to enter the United Kingdom. He has cited the Ukraine and Hong Kong visa schemes as examples of how controlled, legal and orderly pathways can provide protection for those in need while helping to maintain public confidence in the UK's immigration system and prevent the further rise of Reform.

During a House of Commons debate on immigration, Murray criticised remarks by Reform UK MP Suella Braverman linking the use of asylum hotels to the ECHR. He argued instead that the increased use of asylum accommodation was a consequence of policies implemented during Braverman's tenure as Home Secretary, including the Rwanda Act, which he said contributed to a growing asylum backlog. Murray then also criticised the previous government's management of asylum accommodation, stating that the cost per asylum seeker housed in hotels had risen dramatically during Braverman's time in office. Murray said that 'she failed to get the Department to grip the use in public procurement of taxpayers’ money, which she wasted, then tried to instrumentalise to sow division in the country'

== Personal life ==
Murray lives near Easter Road, in Edinburgh.

Murray is gay.

== Political views ==
=== Europe ===
In 2019, Murray was a member of the advisory committee for the Labour for a Public Vote group. Following the poor Scottish Labour results in that year's European Parliament election, he called for members of the party to back another Brexit referendum.

Murray was endorsed by the Labour Movement for Europe in the 2024 General Election. As an MP, Murray has worked on strengthening European ties through his role as Trade Envoy to France. He publicaly called for the UK to re-enter the Erasmus Programme, as a former participant in the scheme. In July 2025, Murray met the Foreign Secretary and called for closer ties with the EU, alongside recognition of the State of Palestine.

=== Palestine ===
Murray has frequently raised the issue of Palestine in Parliament, in particular the issue of children in Gaza, the need for humanitarian aid, and the behaviour of the Israeli Government. In a July 2024 interview with The Student, Murray called for an "immediate and lasting ceasefire" in the Gaza–Israel conflict. In July 2025, he signed a letter calling for the UK to recognise a Palestinian State.

During a debate on the Occupied Palestinian Territories in February 2026, Murray delivered a speech in which he stated that 'We are here to discuss genocide. As my hon. Friend says, 20,000 children have been killed, 95% of hospitals have been destroyed, and food has been blocked to the point of famine. Does she agree that the House of Commons—and, indeed, the world—cannot stand by and let that happen?'

In July 2025, Murray signed a cross-party letter calling for the UK to recognise the State of Palestine.

In July 2026 in a debate in parliament, Murray called for a ban on all trade with Israeli settlements in the occupied territories, Murray argued, 'Be in no doubt: the objective of establishing these illegal settlements is to render an independent Palestinian state unviable. The method is terrorism, expropriation, violence and intimidation, and the outcome will be that the two-state solution that this House has long called for will be impossible, ... the time is long overdue for a ban on trade with illegal Israeli settlements. The UK must comprehensively ban all trade in goods and services with settlements in the occupied territories.'

=== Climate ===
Murray has strongly opposed further oil and gas drilling in the North Sea, signing the stop Rosebank pledge. In August 2025, Murray wrote an article for LBC arguing that the Government should not allow fossil fuel extraction at the Rosebank Oil Field, as it would increase emissions and harm action on climate change. Murray later told The Guardian “We are seeing the consequences of our reliance on fossil fuels play out in real time. This is only the hottest June of your life so far. It makes no sense that, as the country swelters, some are calling for us to permit Rosebank, the UK’s largest undeveloped oilfield."

Murray sits on the advisory group of Labour Climate and Environment Forum.
