= Drummond Shiels =

British politician (1881–1953)

Sir Thomas Drummond Shiels MC MB ChB (7 August 1881 – 1 January 1953) was a Scottish Labour politician.

== Life ==
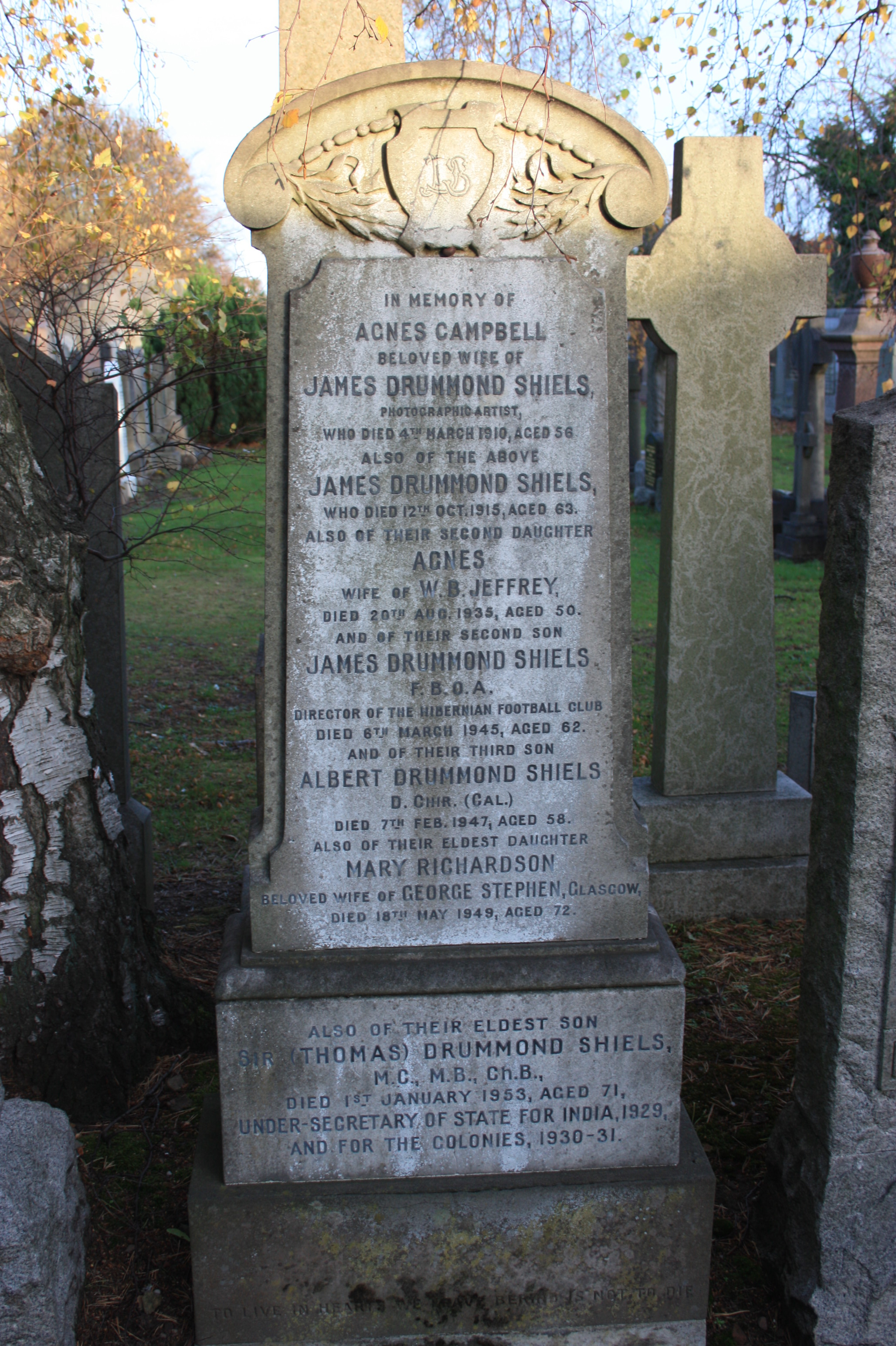
The grave of Drummond Shiels, Grange Cemetery

The son of James Drummond Shiels, photographer, and Agnes Campbell of Edinburgh, he was educated at Edinburgh University where he graduated MB ChB. Prior to obtaining his medical degree he worked as a photographer in Edinburgh.

He was commissioned into the Royal Scots in 1915 and served in the First World War with the 9th (Scottish) Division. He was mentioned in despatches and awarded the Military Cross and the Belgian Croix de Guerre. He ended the war as a captain.

He was a member of Edinburgh Town Council and Labour Member of Parliament for Edinburgh East from 1924 to 1931. He served in government as Parliamentary Under-Secretary of State for India in 1929 and as Parliamentary Under-Secretary of State for the Colonies from 1929 to 1931.

He was a Fellow and Senior President Royal Medical Society and Deputy-Secretary of the Commonwealth Parliamentary Association. He was knighted in the 1939 Birthday Honours for his service as Chairman of the Joint Standing Committee for Educational work of the Non-political Empire Societies in London.

He contributed the opening chapter to The British Commonwealth, a Family of Peoples published in 1952.

He is buried with his parents near the south-west corner of the western extension to Grange Cemetery in Edinburgh.

Parliament of the United Kingdom
Preceded by James Myles Hogge	Member of Parliament for Edinburgh East; 1924–1931	Succeeded by David Marshall Mason
Political offices
Preceded by Earl Winterton	Under-Secretary of State for India; 1929	Succeeded by Earl Russell
Preceded by William Lunn	Under-Secretary of State for the Colonies; 1929–1931	Succeeded by Robert William Hamilton
