= George Willis (politician) =

British Labour Party politician

Eustace George Willis (7 March 1903 – 2 June 1987) was a British Labour Party politician. He was elected as Member of Parliament for Edinburgh North at the 1945 general election, but was defeated at the 1950 general election. He stood again in Edinburgh North at the 1951 election, but was defeated again.

He was returned to the House of Commons as MP for Edinburgh East at a 1954 by-election, and served until his retirement at the 1970 general election. He was Minister of State for Scotland from 1964 to 1967 in the first and second Wilson ministries.

Parliament of the United Kingdom
Preceded by Alexander Erskine-Hill	Member of Parliament for Edinburgh North; 1945–1950	Succeeded by James Latham Clyde
Preceded by John Wheatley	Member of Parliament for Edinburgh East; 1954–1970	Succeeded by Gavin Strang
