= John Wheatley, Baron Wheatley =

Solicitor General for Scotland (1908–1988)

The Lord Wheatley

Lord Justice Clerk
- In office December 1972 – 1985
- Preceded by: Lord Grant
- Succeeded by: Lord Ross

Lord Advocate
- In office October 1947 – 1951
- Preceded by: George Thomson
- Succeeded by: James Clyde

Solicitor General for Scotland
- In office March 1947 – October 1947
- Preceded by: Daniel Blades
- Succeeded by: Douglas Johnston

Member of the uk Parliament for Edinburgh East
- In office November 1947 – 1954
- Preceded by: George Thomson
- Succeeded by: George Willis

Personal details
- Born: January 17, 1908 Shettleston, Glasgow, Scotland
- Died: July 28, 1988 (aged 80)
- Party: Labour
- Spouse: Nancy Nichol (m. 1935)
- Children: 5 (4 sons, 1 daughter), incl. Kathleen Dalyell
- Known for: Wheatley Report (1969); chairing the post-Ibrox disaster inquiry (basis for the Green Guide)

John Thomas Wheatley, Baron Wheatley, PC (17 January 1908 – 28 July 1988) was a Scottish Labour politician and judge.

== Biography ==
Wheatley was born on 17 January 1908 in Shettleston, Glasgow, the third and youngest child of Janet (1877–1951), a pupil teacher and daughter of Peter Murphy, a labourer from Belfast, and Patrick Wheatley (1875–1937), sometime miner and later publisher, who was born in County Waterford. He was educated at St. Aloysius' College, Glasgow, Mount St Mary's College near Sheffield, and the University of Glasgow. He was admitted as an advocate in 1932.

He served in the Royal Artillery and the Judge Advocate Generals' Branch during World War II. As an advocate, he appeared before the Court of Session in his military uniform. As a young man he played football for Shettleston F.C.

He was an unsuccessful parliamentary candidate for Bute and North Ayrshire in 1945 and for Glasgow Bridgeton in 1946, where he was defeated by the Independent Labour Party candidate. He was elected for Edinburgh East at a by-election in November 1947 and sat for the constituency until 1954. During his time in the Commons, he never made a maiden speech.

He was Solicitor General for Scotland from March to October 1947, when he was appointed Lord Advocate. He was appointed a King's Counsel (KC) and a Privy Counsellor (PC) in 1947. One of his most significant achievements as a politician was the establishment of the legal aid scheme in Scotland. He was appointed to the bench, with the judicial title Lord Wheatley. In 1963, he heard the notorious divorce case of Ian Campbell, 11th Duke of Argyll. He granted the Duke a divorce and, in his written opinion, was harshly critical of the Duchess. In 1966 he was appointed chairman of the Royal Commission on Local Government in Scotland.

The resulting "Wheatley Report", published in 1969, led to the eventual introduction a new system of Scottish local authorities. On 28 July 1970 he was created a life peer, as Baron Wheatley, of Shettleston in the County of the City of Glasgow. In December 1972 he was appointed to succeed Lord Grant as Lord Justice Clerk, a post he held until 1985.

Following the Ibrox disaster in 1971, Wheatley was appointed by the government to conduct an inquiry into safety at sports grounds. His 1972 report became the basis for the Green Guide.

Wheatley was a lifelong Roman Catholic. He was also known for hard sentencing of crimes involving sex. While Lord Justice-Clerk (an appeal judge), he exercised his right to sit as a trial judge in criminal cases, and handed out long sentences for such crimes.

== Posthumous ==
It was Wheatley's memorial service in 1988 which was attended by his old friend Lord Mackay of Clashfern, at the time Lord Chancellor. As a member of the Free Presbyterian Church of Scotland, which strongly disapproves of Roman Catholicism, Mackay was disciplined by his church for having attended the memorial service.

== Family ==
His uncle was the Shettleston MP John Wheatley, minister of housing in the 1924 Labour government. Wheatley married Nancy Nichol in 1935. The couple had four sons and a daughter. Wheatley's son-in-law was Tam Dalyell, former father of the House of Commons, who married Wheatley's daughter, Kathleen, in 1963.

Parliament of the United Kingdom
Preceded by George Thomson	Member of Parliament for Edinburgh East; 1947–1954	Succeeded by George Willis
Legal offices
Preceded by Daniel Blades	Solicitor General for Scotland; 1947	Succeeded by Douglas Johnston
Preceded by George Thomson	Lord Advocate; 1947–1951	Succeeded by James Clyde
Preceded by William Grant	Lord Justice Clerk; 1972–1985	Succeeded by Lord Ross
