= Robert Wallace (Edinburgh MP) =

British writer

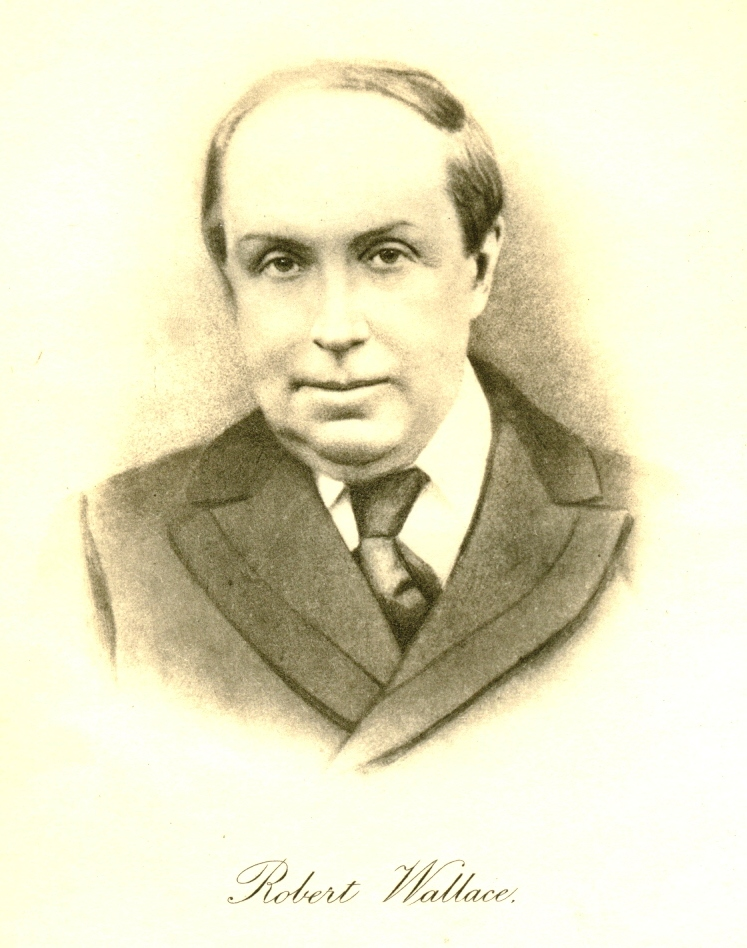
- Taken from the frontispiece of his biography: Robert Wallace: Life and Last Leaves.
- Born: 24 June 1831; Kincaple, St. Andrews, Scotland, UK
- Died: 6 June 1899 (aged 67); London, UK
- Occupations: Writer; biographer; teacher; minister; editor; barrister; politician
- Spouse: Margaret Robertson
- Children: 7
- Writing career
- Genres: Non-fiction, biography, theology

Robert Wallace c1895

Robert Wallace (24 June 1831 – 6 June 1899) was a British writer who had a varied career as a classics teacher, minister, university professor, newspaper editor, barrister, and finally a Member of Parliament for Edinburgh East.

== Personal life and education ==
Wallace was born on 24 June 1831 at Kincaple near St. Andrews, Fife, and was the second son of Jasper Wallace, a gardener, and Elizabeth Archibald. He was educated at the Geddes Institution, Culross, Fife, and at the University of St. Andrews where he graduated with an M.A. in 1853.

== Career ==
Wallace was appointed classical master at Cupar Academy in 1854, shortly after graduating from university. In July 1857, he was licensed as a minister by the Presbytery of Edinburgh, and he was ordained at Newton-on-Ayr Church of Scotland in December.

Three years later, Wallace transferred to Trinity Parish Church, Edinburgh, before transferring again in December 1868, to Old Greyfriars, Edinburgh. While he was minister at Old Greyfriars Church he was involved in attempts to reform and modernise the Church of Scotland. As a result, his fitness to be a minister was questioned and presumably this controversy influenced his decision to leave the clerical profession in August 1876. He was awarded the honorary doctorate of D.D. by Glasgow University in 1869. He was created Professor of Church History at Edinburgh University in 1872. At this time, he lived at 17 Gayfield Square at the top of Leith Walk.

After leaving his clerical role, Wallace was appointed editor of The Scotsman newspaper, a position he held until November 1880. In November 1883 he studied law and called the English Bar at the Middle Temple, London.

Wallace was elected as a Liberal Member of Parliament for the Edinburgh East in the 1886 election and remained so till his death.

He died in London on 6 June 1899.

== Family ==
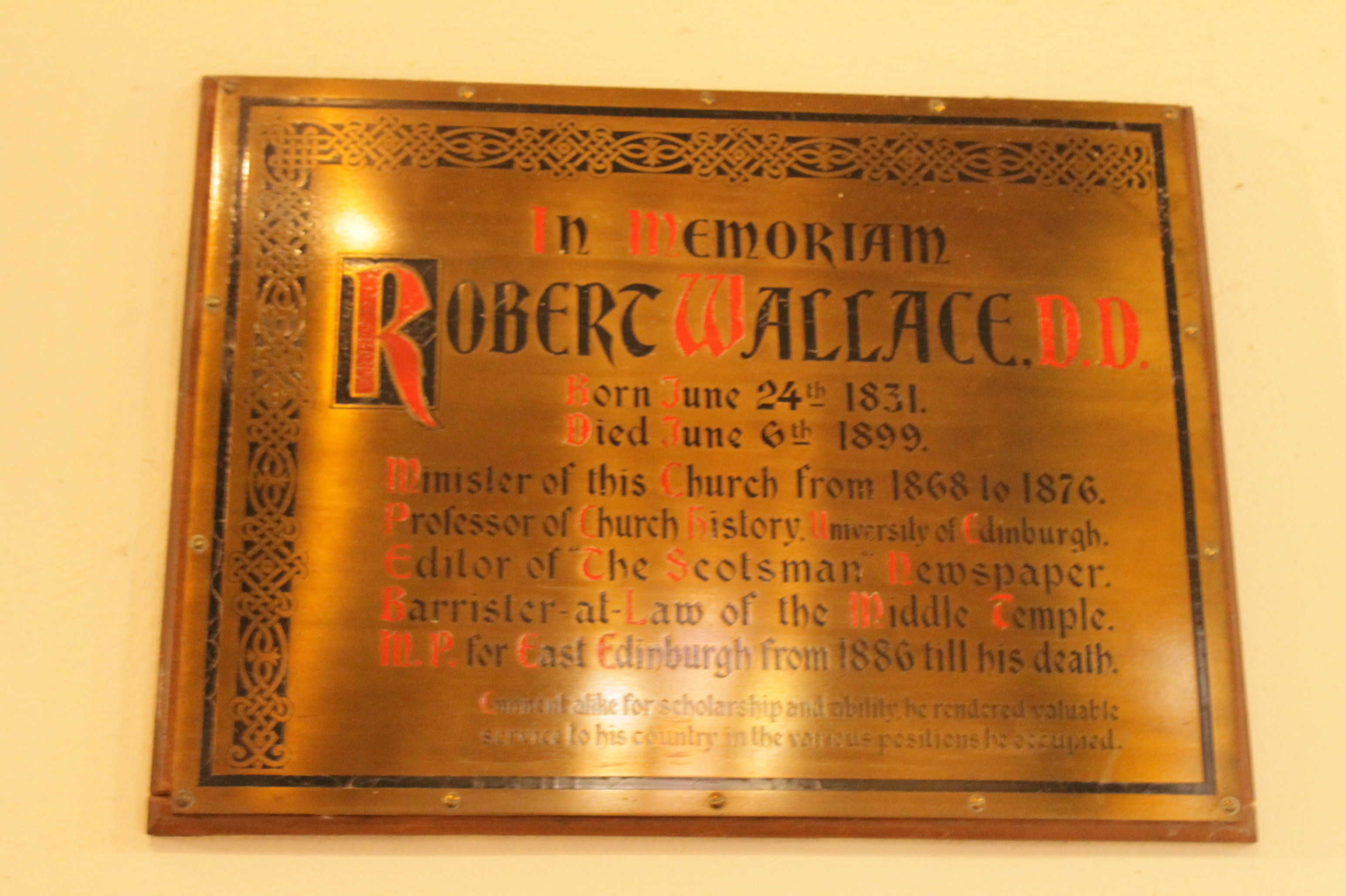
Plaque to Robert Wallace in Greyfriars Kirk

On 10 March 1858 he married Margaret Robertson (died 1898) daughter of James Robertson of Cupar in Fife. They had six sons and one daughter:

- Robert Lamb Wallace (1858-1894) barrister
- James Robertson Wallace MD (born 1860)
- William John Wallace (1861-1862)
- Patrick Robertson Wallace (born 1862)
- Archibald Duncan Wallace (born 1864) died in infancy
- Maggie Ireland Wallace (born 1866) married Alfred Gray of London
- Arthur Stanley Jowett Wallace (born 1872) died in infancy
- Alfred Campbell Wallace (1875-1911) actor

== Publications ==
- Church Tendencies in Scotland. Edinburgh: Recess Studies, 1870.
- The Study of Ecclesiastical History, in its Relation to Church Theology: an inaugural address delivered in the University of Edinburgh, 18 November 1873. Edinburgh: William P. Nimmo, 1873.
- Irish Usurpation in British Politics: a Speech. London : Temple, [1893].
- George Buchanan, (completed by J. Campbell Smith). Edinburgh: Oliphant, Anderson and Ferrier, 1900, ("Famous Scots Series").

== Sources ==
- Fasti Ecclesiae Scoticanae: the Succession of Ministers in the Church of Scotland from the Reformation, edited by Hew Scott, D.D., Volume I, The Synod of Lothian and Tweeddale. Edinburgh: Oliver and Boyd, 1915, pp. 43–44.
- Who Was Who entry, A & C Black, 1920–2008; online edn, Oxford University Press, Dec 2007
- Robert Wallace: Life and Last Leaves. Edited by J. Campbell Smith and William Wallace. London: Sands & Co., 1903. (William Wallace was the brother of Robert Wallace.)
- Library catalogues at www.worldcat.org

Parliament of the United Kingdom
Preceded by George Goschen	Member of Parliament for Edinburgh East; 1886 – 1899	Succeeded by Sir George McCrae
