= Sir James Gibson, 1st Baronet =

Sir James Gibson

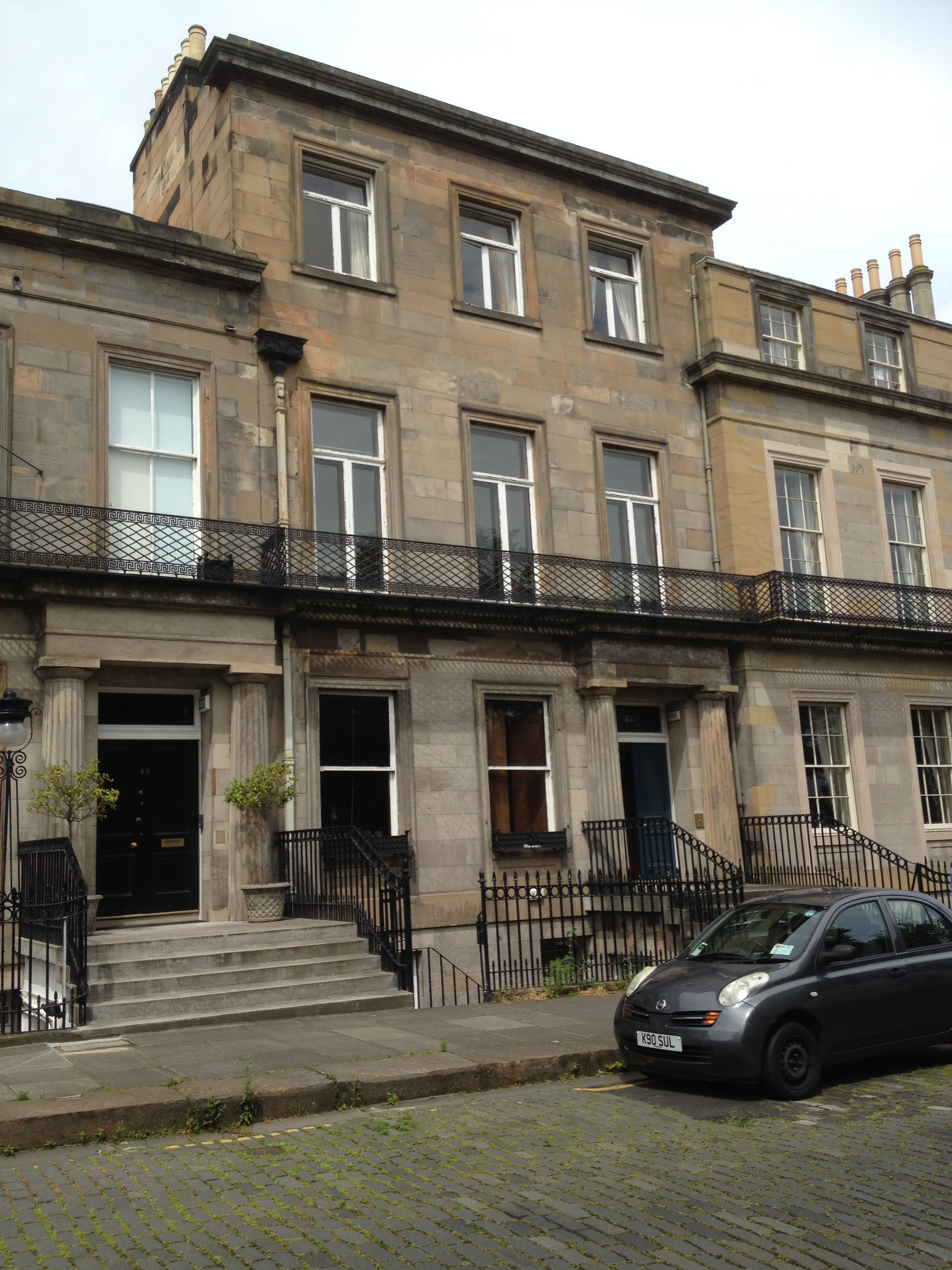
33 Regent Terrace, Edinburgh

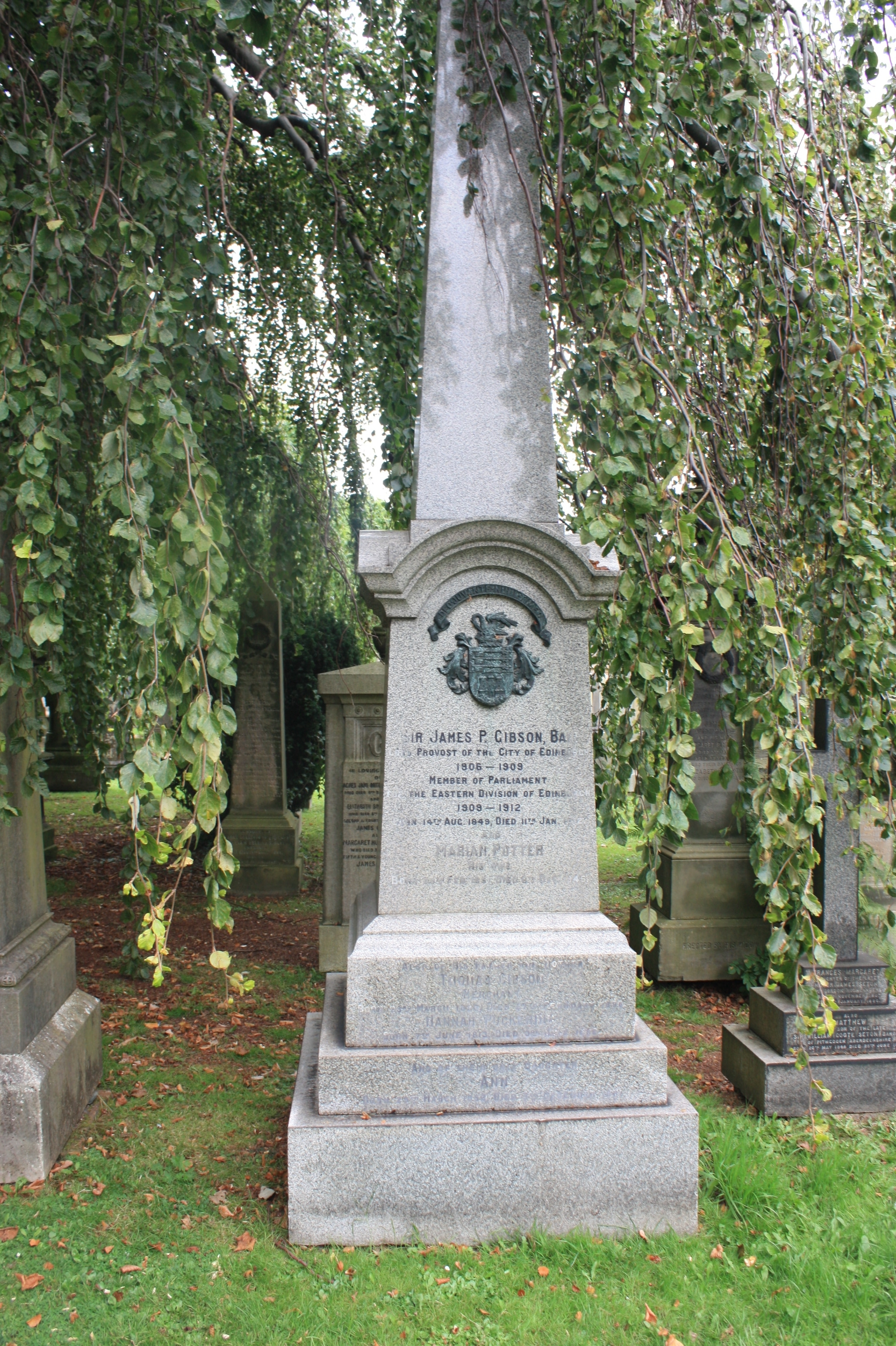
Sir James Gibson's grave, Dean Cemetery

Sir James Puckering Gibson, 1st Baronet (14 August 1849 – 11 January 1912), was a Scottish Liberal Party politician. He was Lord Provost of Edinburgh 1906-9 and Liberal MP for Edinburgh East from 1909 to 1912.

== Early life ==
He was a son of Thomas Gibson, JP, and was educated at the Edinburgh Institution and Edinburgh University.

== Professional career ==
Gibson was a Member of the Edinburgh Merchant Company and the Edinburgh Chamber of Commerce.

== Political career ==
Lord Provost, Edinburgh, 1906–09. He was the successful Liberal candidate for the Edinburgh East Division at the 1909 Edinburgh East by-election.

=== Election results ===
1909 Edinburgh East by-election Electorate 11,710
Party	Candidate	Votes	%	±%
Liberal	James Puckering Gibson	4,527	52.7	−20.4
Liberal Unionist	Patrick Johnstone Ford	4,069	47.3	+20.4
Majority			5.4	−40.8
Turnout			73.4	−4.7
Liberal hold		Swing	-20.4	

General election January 1910: Edinburgh East Electorate 12,544
Party	Candidate	Votes	%	±%
Liberal	Sir James Puckering Gibson	6,760	61.3	
Liberal Unionist	Patrick Johnstone Ford	4,273	38.7	
Majority		2,487	22.6	+17.2
Turnout			88.0	
Liberal hold		Swing		

General election December 1910: Edinburgh East Electorate 12,620
Party	Candidate	Votes	%	±%
Liberal	Sir James Puckering Gibson	6,436	63.0	
Conservative	R.M. Cameron	3,782	37.0	
Majority		2,654	26.0	
Turnout			81.0	−7.0
Liberal hold		Swing		

== Private life ==
Gibson married, in 1874, Marian Potter of Barton Park, Derby. They had no children. He was created a Baronet on 23 November 1909. From 1880 until his death he lived at 33 Regent Terrace.

== Death and burial ==
Gibson died in 1912 at his home on Regent Terrace. As he and Lady Gibson had no children, his title became extinct. He is buried on the north side of the main east-west path in Dean Cemetery in Edinburgh under a large pale grey granite obelisk.

Parliament of the United Kingdom
Preceded by Sir George McCrae	Member of Parliament for Edinburgh East; 1909 – 1912	Succeeded by James Myles Hogge
Baronetage of the United Kingdom
New creation	Baronet (of Regent Terrace); 1909–1912	Extinct
Preceded by Crossley baronets	Gibson baronets of Regent Terrace; 23 November 1909	Succeeded by Johnson baronets
