= Sheila Gilmore =

British politician (born 1949)

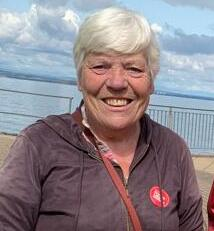
- Gilmore in 2023

Member of Parliament for Edinburgh East
- In office 6 May 2010 – 30 March 2015
- Preceded by: Gavin Strang
- Succeeded by: Tommy Sheppard

Personal details
- Born: 1 October 1949 (age 76) Aberdeen, Aberdeenshire, Scotland
- Party: Labour
- Education: University of Kent; University of Edinburgh

Sheila Gilmore (born 1 October 1949) is a British Labour Party politician, who was the Member of Parliament (MP) for Edinburgh East from 2010 to 2015. Gilmore stood for the seat following the decision of Gavin Strang to stand down; she is a former councillor at the City of Edinburgh Council.

== Childhood and early career ==
Gilmore was born in Aberdeen in 1949. She moved to Edinburgh in 1956. She studied History and Politics at the University of Kent at Canterbury. After graduating she undertook a post-graduate teaching qualification at the University of Edinburgh. She then taught for two years in Glasgow and Dunfermline.

Gilmore then returned to the University of Edinburgh to study law. Upon graduating she worked for the Scottish Consumer Council as a Legal Advisory Officer. She then went on to work for a private law practice in Edinburgh focusing on family law. She represented clients receiving legal aid in cases involving divorce, domestic abuse, child protection and adoption.

== City of Edinburgh Council ==
Gilmore was a member of the Labour Party as a teenager but joined the International Marxist Group during the 1970s. She left in 1976 to join the Scottish Labour Party (SLP), a breakaway from the official Labour Party led by Jim Sillars. Later she rejoined the official party and was elected in an Edinburgh District Council by-election for Moredun ward in 1991. She was appointed Convenor for Housing in 1999. She retained this position until she stood down from the council in 2007. Gilmore's proposal to transfer all the council's housing to a new housing association was defeated in a referendum.

== 2007 Scottish Parliament elections ==
Gilmore stood for the Scottish Parliament constituency of Edinburgh Pentlands in the 2007 Scottish Parliament elections, but came second to the Conservative Party candidate David McLetchie.

== 2010 general election ==
In April 2009, Sheila Gilmore was selected as Labour's candidate for the Westminster constituency of Edinburgh East from an all-woman shortlist. Gilmore beat lawyer Catriona Munro, City of Edinburgh councillors Norma Hart and Angela Blacklock, and local party activist Karen Doran.

The selection process was triggered by the announcement by the incumbent MP, Gavin Strang, that he would not be seeking re-election at the forthcoming general election.

The 2010 UK general election was held on 6 May 2010, and Gilmore was one of six candidates for the constituency of Edinburgh East. She received 17,314 votes, which was a 43% share of the vote and a majority of 9,181. She lost the seat to Tommy Sheppard of the SNP at the 2015 general election.

== Family ==
Gilmore is married to Brian Gilmore. They live in Edinburgh and have four grown up children.

Parliament of the United Kingdom
Preceded by Gavin Strang	Member of Parliament for Edinburgh East; 2010–2015	Succeeded by Tommy Sheppard
