= Mungo Bovey =

Scottish lawyer

Mungo Bovey, KC (born 1 May 1959) is a Scottish advocate (lawyer). He is Keeper of the Faculty of Advocates' Library.

He is a graduate of the University of Glasgow, in his time there he was involved in student politics, and opposed the twinning with Beir Zeit University.

He is involved in the Scottish National Party, and has represented them in court cases (e.g. SNP, Petitioners). He stood as the SNP candidate in Edinburgh East. His father was Keith Bovey, who was the SNP candidate in the 1978 Glasgow Garscadden by-election.
