= McCrae's Battalion Great War Memorial =

Coordinates: 50.0224°N 2.7297°E

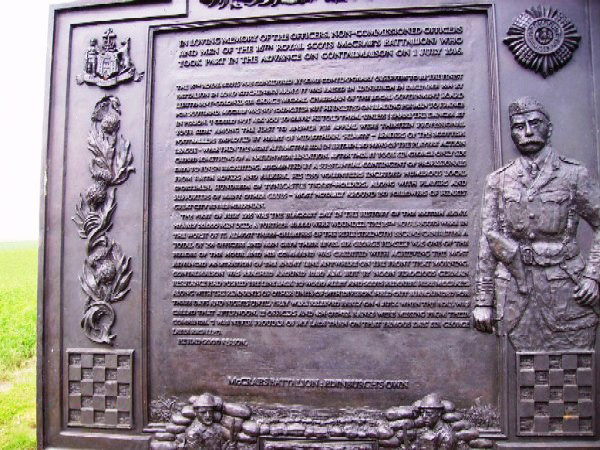
detail of memorial cairn (1)

McCrae's Battalion Great War Memorial is a World War I memorial cairn located in the village of Contalmaison, France. Designed by the historian, Jack Alexander, it was unveiled in 2004 after being first proposed by survivors of the battalion in 1919. As such, it is the last of the 'original' Great War memorials to be built. It commemorates the dead of the 16th Royal Scots volunteer battalion formed by Sir George McCrae, known as 'The Sporting Battalion', who participated in the First Battle of the Somme, July 1916.

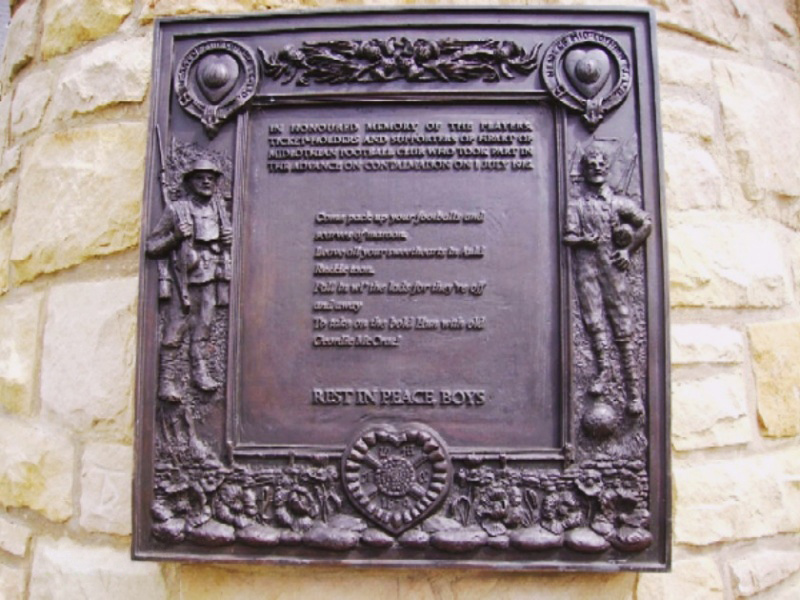
detail of memorial cairn (2)

The battalion was notable for its high number of professional sportsmen and fans drawn from the football clubs Heart of Midlothian FC, Hibernian FC, Raith Rovers FC, Falkirk FC and Dunfermline FC and a variety of other sporting clubs. Visiting the Contalmaison Cairn has become something of a pilgrimage - particularly for football supporters and school groups.
