= Edinburgh East and Musselburgh (UK Parliament constituency) =

UK Parliament constituency (1997–2005, 2024 onwards)

- Burgh constituency for the House of Commons
- Interactive map of boundaries from 2024
- Location within Scotland
- Subdivision: City of Edinburgh; East Lothian
- Electorate: 75,705 (March 2020)

Current constituency
- Created: 2024
- Member of Parliament: Chris Murray (Labour)
- Seats: One
- Created from: Edinburgh East

1997–2005
- Created from: Edinburgh East
- Replaced by: Edinburgh East; East Lothian

Edinburgh East and Musselburgh is a burgh constituency of the House of Commons of the Parliament of the United Kingdom (at Westminster). It elects one Member of Parliament (MP) by the first past the post system of election.

In its present form, the constituency was established as part of the 2023 review of Westminster constituencies and under the final recommendations of the Boundary Commission for Scotland, replacing Edinburgh East. It has been held by Labour politician Chris Murray since the 2024 general election.

The constituency had previously existed from 1997 to 2005. In 1999, a Scottish Parliament constituency was created with the same name and boundaries and was used until 2011.

== Boundaries ==
The constituency covers an eastern portion of the City of Edinburgh council area and most of the Musselburgh ward of the East Lothian council area. It is one of six constituencies covering the City of Edinburgh area, and one of two covering the East Lothian area. The constituency is predominantly urban.

It comprises the following:

- In full: the City of Edinburgh Council wards of Craigentinny/Duddingston and Portobello/Craigmillar.
- In part: the City of Edinburgh Council wards of City Centre (Old Town area), Leith Walk (small area), Leith (small area) and Southside/Newington (small part comprising the South Side area).
- In part: the East Lothian Council ward of Musselburgh (majority including the town of Musselburgh).

The parts in the City of Edinburgh comprise the former constituency of Edinburgh East, except the area of Prestonfield, which was transferred to Edinburgh South. The part in East Lothian Council was transferred from the East Lothian constituency (renamed Lothian East).

When the original constituency was abolished for the 2005 general election, most of it was merged into the new Edinburgh East constituency. The rest of it, the Musselburgh area, was merged into the East Lothian constituency.

== Members of Parliament ==
Election	Member	Party
1997	Gavin Strang	Labour
2005	constituency abolished – see Edinburgh East	
2024	Chris Murray	Labour

== Election results ==
=== Elections in the 2020s ===
General election 2024: Edinburgh East and Musselburgh
Party	Candidate	Votes	%	±%
Labour	Chris Murray	18,790	41.2	+14.8
SNP	Tommy Sheppard	15,075	33.1	−15.9
Green	Amanda Grimm	4,669	10.2	+6.6
Conservative	Marie-Clair Munro	2,598	5.7	−8.4
Reform	Derek Winton	2,129	4.7	N/A
Liberal Democrats	Charles Dundas	1,949	4.3	−2.7
Independent	Jane Gould	365	0.8	N/A
Majority		3,715	8.1	N/A
Turnout		45,575	59.8	−9.0
Registered electors		76,188		
Labour gain from SNP		Swing	+14.3	

=== Elections in the 2010s ===
2019 notional result (Note: Estimate of the 2019 general election result as if the revised boundaries recommended under the 2023 boundary review were in place)
Party	Vote	%
SNP	25,587	49.0
Labour	13,791	26.4
Conservative	7,354	14.1
Liberal Democrats	3,642	7.0
Scottish Greens	1,879	3.6
Majority	11,796	22.6
Turnout	52,253	69.0
Electorate	75,705	

=== Elections of the 2000s ===
General election 2001: Edinburgh East and Musselburgh
Party	Candidate	Votes	%	±%
Labour	Gavin Strang	18,124	52.6	−1.0
SNP	Rob Munn	5,956	17.3	−1.8
Liberal Democrats	Gary Peacock	4,981	14.5	+3.8
Conservative	Peter Finnie	3,906	11.3	−4.1
Scottish Socialist	Derek Durkin	1,487	4.3	New
Majority		12,168	35.3	+0.8
Turnout		34,454	58.2	−12.4
Labour hold		Swing		

=== Elections of the 1990s ===
General election 1997: Edinburgh East and Musselburgh
Party	Candidate	Votes	%	±%
Labour	Gavin Strang	22,564	53.6	
SNP	Derrick White	8,034	19.1	
Conservative	Kenneth F. Ward	6,483	15.4	
Liberal Democrats	Callum I. MacKellar	4,511	10.7	
Referendum	James A. Sibbet	526	1.2	
Majority		14,530	34.5	
Turnout		42,118	70.6	
Labour win (new seat)				

== See also ==
- Politics of Edinburgh
