= 1912 Edinburgh East by-election =

UK parliamentary by-election

The 1912 Edinburgh East by-election was a Parliamentary by-election held on 2 February 1912. The constituency returned one Member of Parliament (MP) to the House of Commons of the United Kingdom, elected by the first past the post voting system.

== Vacancy ==
Sir James Gibson had been Liberal MP for the seat of Edinburgh East since the 1909 Edinburgh East by-election. On 10 January 1912 his poor health was reported by The Times, who commented that he had been ill for some time. His death was reported two days later.

== Electoral history ==
The seat had been won by a Liberal at every election since it was created in 1885. The result at the last election was as follows.

Sir James Gibson

General election December 1910 Edinburgh East
Party	Candidate	Votes	%	±%
Liberal	James Gibson	6,436	63.0	+1.7
Liberal Unionist	R M Cameron	3,782	37.0	−1.7
Majority		2,654	26.0	+3.4
Turnout		10,218	81.0	−7.0
Liberal hold		Swing	+1.7	

However, at the by-election in 1909, the Liberal majority had been reduced to 458 votes - 5.4%.

== Candidates ==
When the by-election was first announced, the Conservative Party had already chosen John Gordon Jameson as their prospective candidate and he was quickly adopted. He was an advocate and son of Lord Ardwall.

It took the Liberals a bit longer to settle on a candidate. There was early speculation that Andrew Anderson the Solicitor General for Scotland would be the Liberal candidate as he was without a seat in parliament having lost his seat at the 1911 North Ayrshire by-election. However, he expressed a desire to remain Liberal candidate for North Ayrshire. By 22 January, 38-year-old James Myles Hogge was chosen by the Liberals to defend the seat. He was raised in Edinburgh, where he attended the Edinburgh Normal School, Moray House School of Education, and the University of Edinburgh, where he was president of the Liberal Society. He was a founding member of the Young Scots' Society that favoured a Scottish Parliament. He started work as a pupil teacher in Edinburgh and was a 1st class King's Scholar at Moray House Training College, Edinburgh. In December 1910, Hogge stood as Liberal candidate in the Camlachie division of Glasgow, losing narrowly to a Liberal Unionist.

== Campaign ==
Jameson, the Unionist candidate unsurprisingly sought to champion opposition to two Liberal Government policies, the Irish Home Rule proposals and the National Insurance Act while supporting Tariff Reform. However, he also spoke out in favour of the abolition of hereditary peers and making the second chamber democratic. He also favoured the use of public referendums. He was opposed to giving women the vote and opposed to granting Home Rule for Scotland.

For the Liberal, Hogge stood for Irish and Scottish Home Rule, universal adult suffrage, temperance reform and the reform of the land laws. He also favoured the abolition of the House of Lords.

The Edinburgh branch of the National Society for Women's Suffrage after questioning both candidates unsurprisingly chose to support the Liberal, James Hogge. The National Union of Women's Suffrage Societies also chose to use interest in the by-election to promote women's suffrage through a series of local meetings.

== Result ==
James Hogge

By-Election 2 February 1912: Edinburgh East Electorate
Party	Candidate	Votes	%	±%
Liberal	James Myles Hogge	5,064	55.0	−8.0
Liberal Unionist	John Gordon Jameson	4,139	45.0	+8.0
Majority		925	10.0	−16.0
Turnout		9,203	73.7	−7.3
Liberal hold		Swing	-8.0	

Unsurprisingly, the Liberal majority was well down on what it had been at the last General election, however, the majority was nearly twice as much as it had been following the by-election in 1909.

== Aftermath ==
A General election was due to take place by the end of 1915. By the autumn of 1914, the following candidates had been adopted to contest that election.

- Liberal: James Myles Hogge
- Unionist:

Due to the outbreak of war, the election never took place.

General election 14 December 1918: Edinburgh East Electorate 25,895
Party	Candidate	Votes	%	±%
Liberal	James Myles Hogge	8,460	62.2	+7.2
National Democratic	Alexander E Balfour	5,136	37.8	New
Majority		3,324	24.4	+14.4
Turnout		13,596	52.5	−21.2
Liberal hold		Swing		

- Balfour was the endorsed candidate of the Coalition Government.
