= James Hogge =

British politician

Member of Parliament for Edinburgh East
- In office 2 February 1912 – 29 October 1924
- Preceded by: James Gibson
- Succeeded by: Drummond Shiels

Personal details
- Born: James Myles Hogge; 19 April 1873
- Died: 27 October 1928 (aged 55) Hammersmith, London, UK
- Party: Liberal
- Spouse: Florence Metcalfe
- Children: 3
- Education: Moray House School of Education
- Alma mater: University of Edinburgh

James Myles Hogge (19 April 1873 – 27 October 1928) was a British social researcher and Liberal Party politician.

== Early life and career ==
Hogge was educated at the Edinburgh Normal School, Moray House School of Education, and the University of Edinburgh, where he was president of the Liberal Association. Hogge at first wanted to be teacher. He began as pupil teacher in Edinburgh and was a 1st class King's Scholar at Moray House Training College, Edinburgh but he then qualified as a preacher in the United Free Church of Scotland. However, after engaging in work in the Edinburgh slums, he changed career again to concentrate on social work and research; first in Edinburgh, then in York with Joseph Rowntree and his son Seebohm.

== Political career ==
Hogge was elected to the York City Council as a Progressive in the Castlegate ward from 1907–1913. He was president of the York City and County Liberal Club and secretary of the Thirsk and Malton Liberal Association. In December 1910, Hogge stood as Liberal candidate in the Camlachie division of Glasgow, losing narrowly to a Liberal Unionist. The intervention of the women's suffrage candidate, had the effect of ensuring the election of Mackinder, who opposed women's suffrage at the expense of Hogge, who supported it.

He was elected to Parliament at a by-election in February 1912 at Edinburgh East.

An opponent of the Lloyd George coalition, he was not given the 'coupon' at the general election of 1918 but increased his majority as an "Independent" Liberal.

From 1919–1920 he was President of the National Association of Discharged Sailors and Soldiers.

He had misgivings about H. H. Asquith's leadership, however, and fell out of favour with the 'Wee Free' party establishment. He held his Edinburgh seat until the general election of 1924.

=== Elections contested ===
==== UK Parliament elections ====
Date of election	Constituency	Party	Votes	%	Result
1910 (Dec)	Glasgow Camlachie	Liberal	3,479	40.6	Not elected (2nd)
1912	Edinburgh East	Liberal	5,064	55.0	Elected
1918	Edinburgh East	Liberal	8,460	62.2	Elected
1922	Edinburgh East	Liberal	10,551	59.8	Elected
1923	Edinburgh East	Liberal	10,876	68.3	Elected
1924	Edinburgh East	Liberal	5,625	27.9	Not elected (3rd)

== Personal life and death ==
On 4 February 1905, Hogge married Florence Rebecca Metcalfe, a widow from Malton in Yorkshire. They had one son and two daughters.

Hogge died at his home in Hammersmith on 27 October 1928 aged 55.

Parliament of the United Kingdom
Preceded by Sir James Gibson, Bt	Member of Parliament for Edinburgh East; 1912–1924	Succeeded by Thomas Drummond Shiels
Party political offices
Preceded by John Gulland	Liberal Chief Whip; 1919–1923; With: George Thorne	Succeeded by Vivian Phillipps
