= Contalmaison =

- Commune
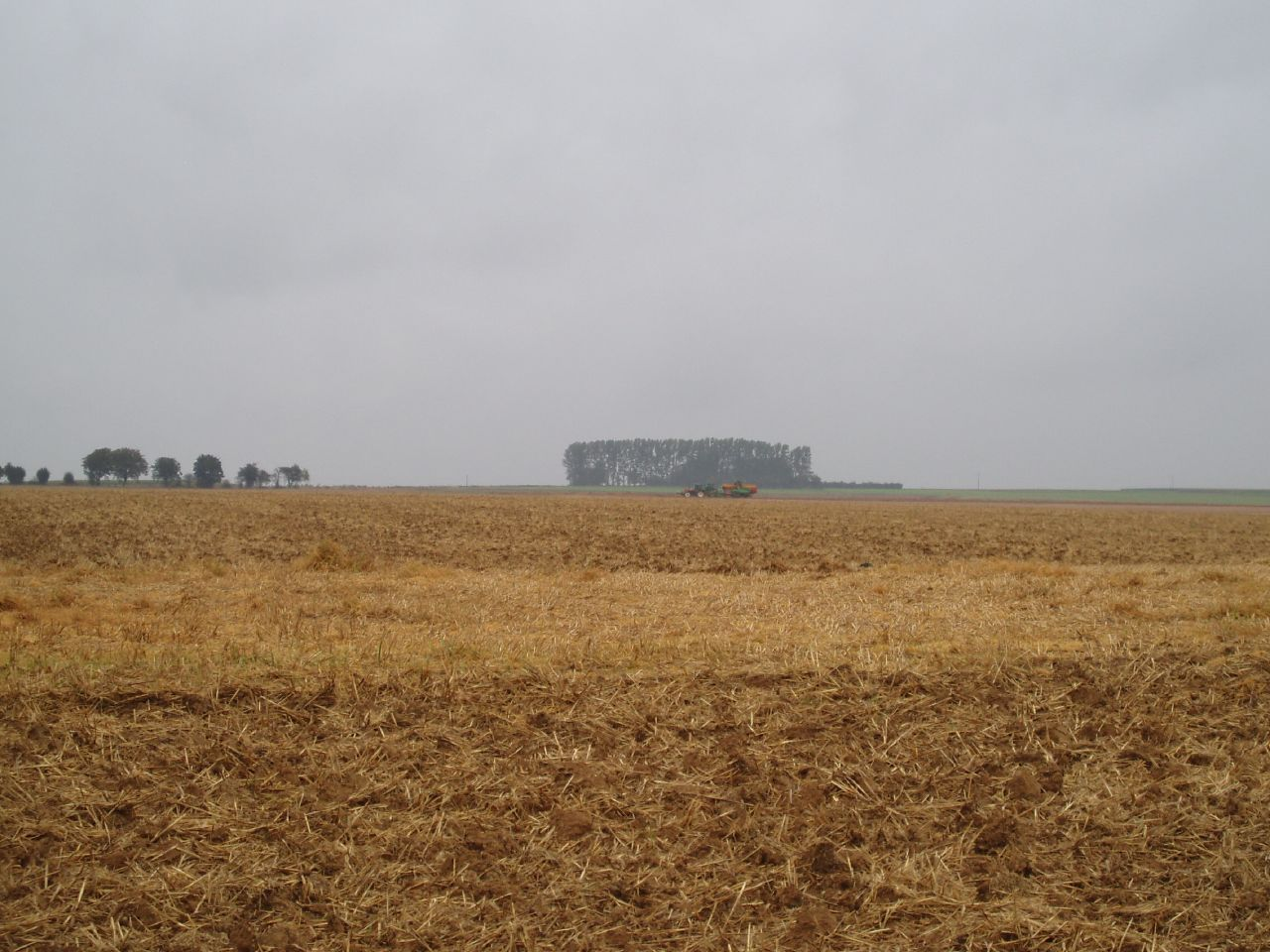
- Fields in Contalmaison

- Coat of arms
- Location of Contalmaison
- Location within France Location within Hauts-de-France
- Coordinates: 50°01′26″N 2°43′52″E
- Country: France
- Region: Hauts-de-France
- Department: Somme
- Arrondissement: Péronne
- Canton: Albert
- Intercommunality: Pays du Coquelicot

Government
  - Mayor (2020–2026): Jocelyne Gougeon
- Area^{1}: 5.67 km^{2} (2.19 sq mi)
- Elevation: 120 m (390 ft)
- Highest elevation: 161 m (528 ft)
- Lowest elevation: 87 m (285 ft)
- Population (2023): 122
  - Density: 21.5/km^{2} (55.7/sq mi)
- Time zone: UTC+01:00 (CET)
  - Summer (DST): UTC+02:00 (CEST)
- INSEE/Postal code: 80206 /80300
- ^{1} French Land Register data, which excludes lakes, ponds, glaciers > 1 km^{2} (0.386 sq mi or 247 acres) and river estuaries.

Contalmaison (French pronunciation: [kɔ̃talmɛzɔ̃]) is a commune in the Somme department in Hauts-de-France in northern France.

== Geography ==
Contalmaison is situated on the D147 and D20 crossroads, some 30 miles (48 km) northeast of Amiens.

== History ==
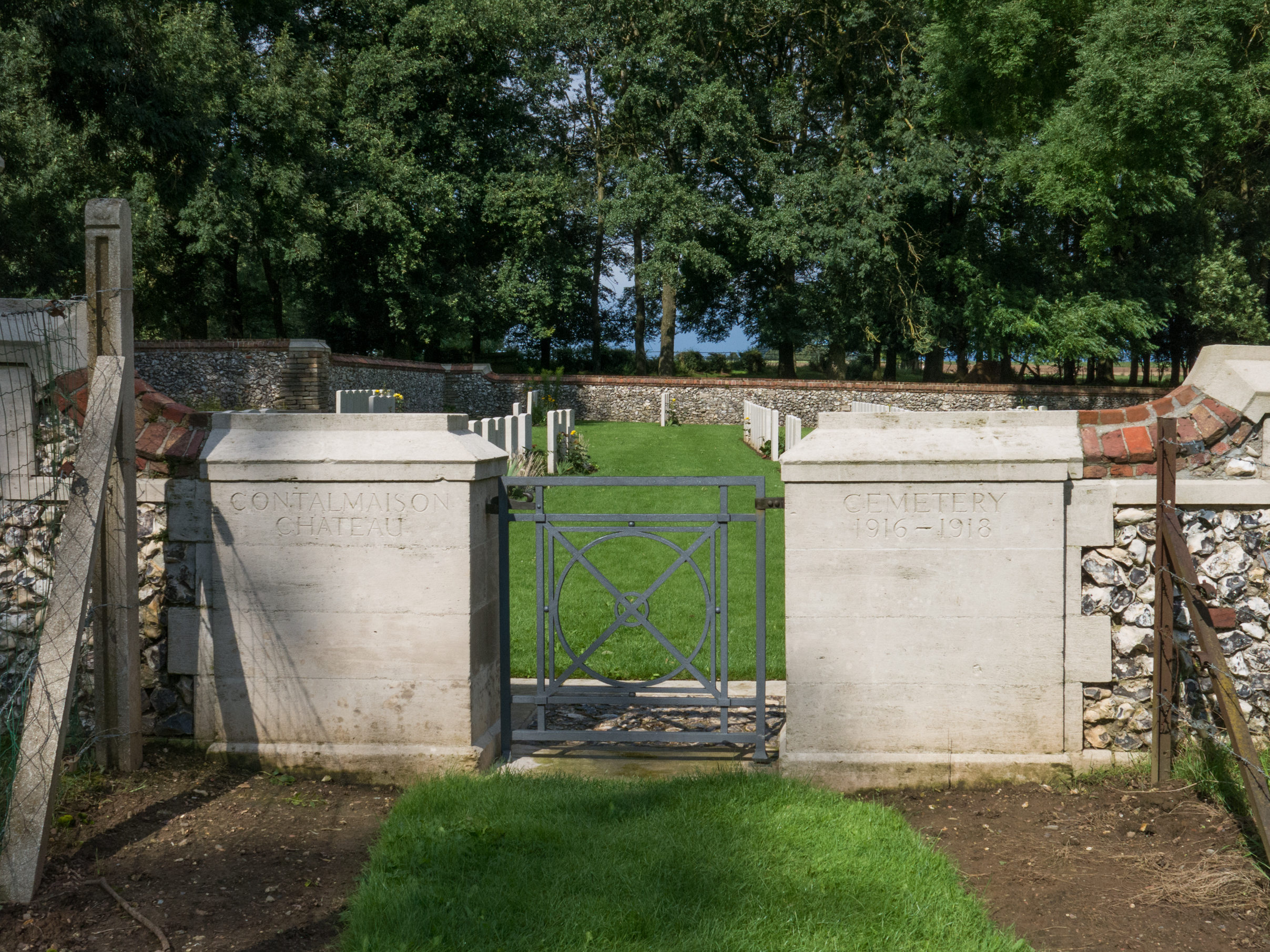
Entrance to Contalmaison Chateau cemetery

As with many towns in this part of France, Contalmaison saw a great deal of fighting during World War I and was one of the allied objectives in the first Battle of the Somme.

A high number of casualties fell on the first day: 1 July 1916. The advance from the British line in front of Albert, was led by the 34th Division, a New Army formation recruited in Edinburgh, Northumberland, Grimsby and Cambridge. Elements of the 16th Royal Scots ('McCrae's Battalion') and of Tyneside Irish battalions of the Northumberland Fusiliers succeeded in penetrating the village defences on 1 July before being outnumbered and forced to withdraw by stubborn German opposition.

The village is notable for its McCrae's Battalion Great War Memorial which honours the fallen of the 16th Royal Scots. Designed by the historian Jack Alexander, the 'Contalmaison Cairn' was unveiled in November 2004, completing a project first proposed by veterans of the battalion in 1919. As such, it remains the last of the 'original' Great War memorials to be built.

== Population ==
Historical population
Year	Pop.	±% p.a.
1968	84	—
1975	106	+3.38%
1982	101	−0.69%
1990	104	+0.37%
1999	98	−0.66%
2007	119	+2.46%
2012	122	+0.50%
2017	118	−0.66%
2023	122	+0.56%
Source: INSEE

== See also ==
- Communes of the Somme department
