= 1909 Edinburgh East by-election =

UK parliamentary by-election

- 16 April 1909

Candidate	Gibson	Ford
Party	Liberal	Liberal Unionist
Popular vote	4,527	4,069
Percentage	52.7%	47.3%
MP before election
Sir George McCrae
Liberal
Subsequent MP
Sir James Gibson
Liberal

The 1909 Edinburgh East by-election was a Parliamentary by-election held on 16 April 1909. The constituency returned one Member of Parliament (MP) to the House of Commons of the United Kingdom, elected by the first past the post voting system.

== Vacancy ==
Sir George McCrae had been Liberal MP for the seat of Edinburgh East since the 1899 Edinburgh East by-election. He resigned from the House of Commons to take up a position in Scottish government service, accepting the appointment of Vice-President of the Scottish Local Government Board.

== Electoral history ==
The seat had been won by a Liberal at every election since it was created in 1885. They easily held the seat at the last election, with an increased majority;

General election 1906: Edinburgh East
Party	Candidate	Votes	%	±%
Liberal	George McCrae	6,606	73.1	+14.6
Liberal Unionist	Rankin Dawson	2,432	26.9	−14.6
Majority		4,174	46.2	+29.2
Turnout		9,038	78.1	+8.9
Registered electors		11,572		
Liberal hold		Swing	+14.6	

== Candidates ==
The local Liberal Association selected 60-year-old James Gibson to defend the seat. He had been Lord Provost of Edinburgh since 1906. The Conservatives selected 29-year-old Patrick Ford as their candidate.

== Campaign ==
Polling Day was fixed for 16 April 1909.

== Result ==
The Liberal majority was only a ninth of their 1906 result. This was generally ascribed to the loss of the Roman Catholic vote because of the failure to settle the education question.;

Gibson

Edinburgh East by-election, 1909
Party	Candidate	Votes	%	±%
Liberal	James Gibson	4,527	52.7	−20.4
Liberal Unionist	Patrick Ford	4,069	47.3	+20.4
Majority		458	5.4	−40.8
Turnout		8,596	73.4	−4.7
Registered electors		11,710		
Liberal hold		Swing	−20.4	

== Aftermath ==
General election January 1910: Edinburgh East
Party	Candidate	Votes	%	±%
Liberal	James Gibson	6,760	61.3	+8.6
Liberal Unionist	Patrick Ford	4,273	38.7	−8.6
Majority		2,487	22.6	+17.2
Turnout		11,033	88.0	+14.6
Registered electors		12,544		
Liberal hold		Swing	+8.6	
