= Tommy Sheppard (politician) =

Scottish National Party politician

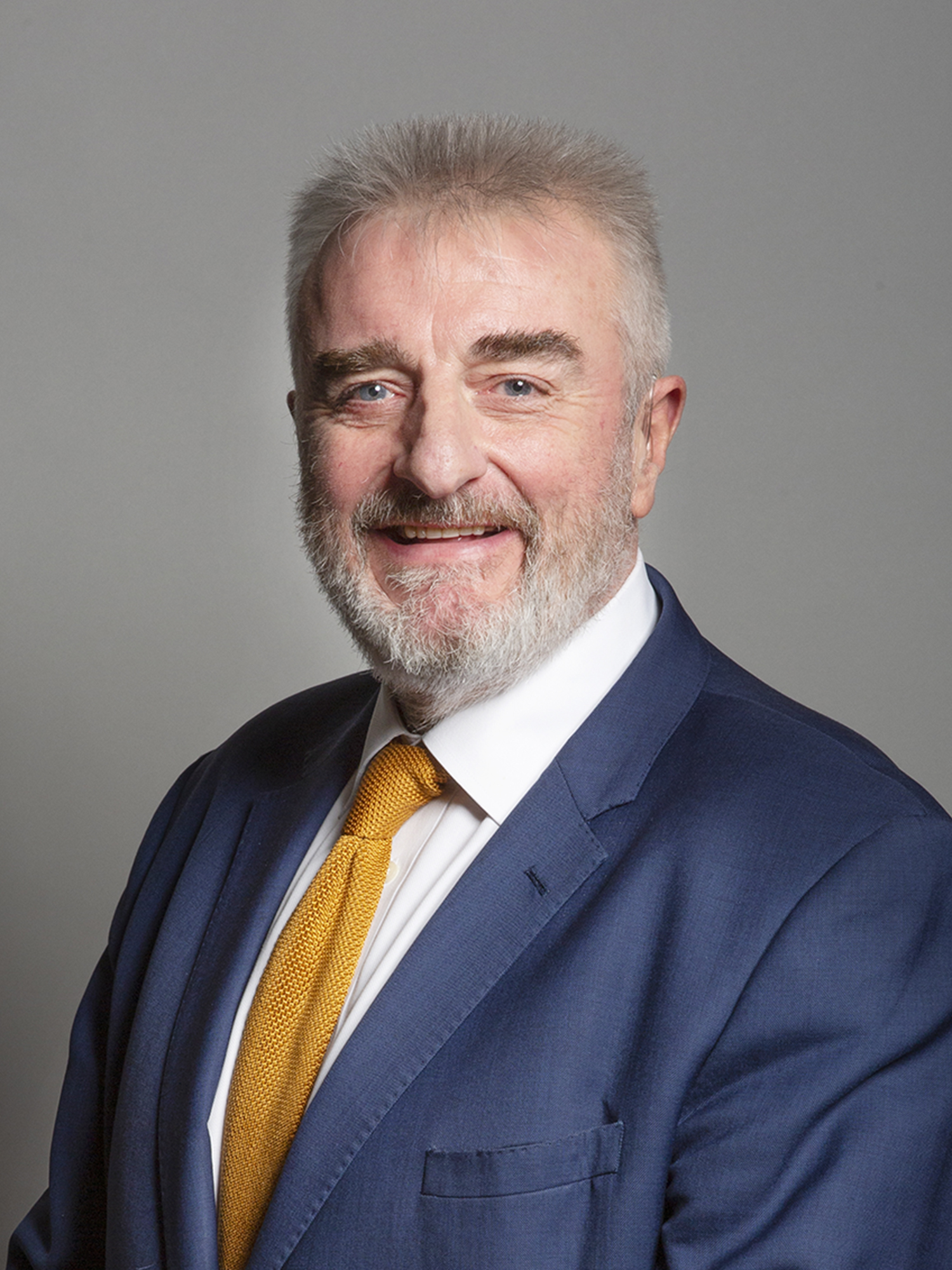
- Official portrait, 2020

SNP Scotland Spokesperson in the House of Commons
- In office 4 September 2023 – 5 July 2024
- Leader: Stephen Flynn
- Preceded by: Philippa Whitford
- In office 20 June 2017 – 7 January 2020
- Leader: Ian Blackford
- Preceded by: Margaret Ferrier
- Succeeded by: Mhairi Black

Member of Parliament for Edinburgh East
- In office 7 May 2015 – 30 May 2024
- Preceded by: Sheila Gilmore
- Succeeded by: Constituency abolished

Personal details
- Born: 6 March 1959 (age 67) Coleraine, Northern Ireland
- Party: Scottish National Party (2014–present)
- Other political affiliations: Labour (1979–2003)
- Education: University of Aberdeen
- Website: Official website

Tommy Sheppard (born 6 March 1959) is a Scottish National Party (SNP) politician who was the Member of Parliament (MP) for Edinburgh East from 2015 until the seat's abolition in 2024. He is a former SNP spokesperson for Scotland, the Cabinet Office and former SNP Shadow Leader of the House of Commons. He is also known for founding The Stand Comedy Clubs in Edinburgh and Glasgow.

== Early life and education ==
Tommy Sheppard was born on 6 March 1959 in Coleraine, Northern Ireland, and moved to nearby Portstewart at the age of seven. He was educated at Coleraine Academical Institution before attending the University of Aberdeen to study medicine. He graduated with a degree in politics and sociology in 1982; in the same year he was elected vice-president of the National Union of Students (NUS) and moved to London.

== Political career ==
Sheppard left the NUS in 1984 to work in the East End of London and in 1986 was elected as a Labour member on Hackney London Borough Council. In 1990 he became Deputy Leader of the council.

In 1994 he was appointed Assistant General Secretary of Scottish Labour under John Smith. In 1997 he was made redundant from this role due to internal policy disagreements.

He ceased to renew his Labour Party membership in 2003, stating: "I joined the Labour Party in 1979, just before my 21st birthday. Now 25 years later I've finally got around to cancelling the direct debit. I can no longer bring myself to vote Labour. My outlook has barely changed, but clearly the Labour Party has. I can no longer believe the Labour Party is likely to change the world very much, or at least not in a direction I would like".

In 2012 he became the Edinburgh South organiser of the Yes Scotland campaign, but joined the SNP only in 2014 after the 2014 Scottish independence referendum.

== Parliamentary career ==
Sheppard stood as the Labour candidate in Bury St Edmunds at the 1992 general election, coming second with 23.6% of the vote behind the Conservative candidate Richard Spring.

In January 2015, Sheppard was selected as the SNP candidate for Edinburgh East. At the 2015 general election, Sheppard was elected to Parliament as MP for Edinburgh East with 49.2% of the vote and a majority of 9,106.

Sheppard is a staunch republican, and during the Wedding of Prince William and Catherine Middleton, he remarked "off with their heads", prompting some criticism. Writing ahead of Prince Harry and Meghan Markle's wedding in 2018, Sheppard said, "There are many things to be proud of in Britain, but the class system and the inequality it spawns is not one of them. The monarchy sits at the apex of that system of patronage and privilege".

At the snap 2017 general election, Sheppard was re-elected as MP for Edinburgh East with a decreased vote share of 42.5% and a decreased majority of 3,425. During the election, he urged the Scottish Greens to step down from contesting marginal seats where the pro-independence vote might be split.

Sheppard is an atheist and a humanist, and was elected vice chair of the All-Party Parliamentary Humanist Group in September 2017.

In August 2017, Sheppard encouraged First Minister Nicola Sturgeon to abandon plans for a second Scottish independence referendum before Brexit. He suggested the cause of Scottish independence would be served best if Sturgeon offered Scotland a vote on a future relationship with the European Union after Brexit and only once Scotland had become independent. In November 2017 he claimed that Scotland still had a mandate for a second independence referendum and that the Conservatives were wrong to think that the loss in SNP seats in the snap general election had caused a delay in the timetable for a second vote.

In August 2017, Sheppard expressed admiration for the 18th century Scottish reformer and radical Thomas Muir, linking Muir's politics and life to the modern Scottish independence movement.

In March 2018, he was widely considered one of the possible contenders for the 2018 Scottish National Party depute leadership election after having stood in the previous 2016 depute leadership election, but ruled himself out.

In July 2018, reflecting on the decision of SNP MPs to vote no confidence in the Labour Government in 1979, Sheppard told the House of Commons, "In retrospect, I would have done exactly the same thing".

At the 2019 general election, Sheppard was again re-elected, with an increased vote share of 48.4% and an increased majority of 10,417.

Due to the 2023 review of Westminster constituencies, Sheppard's constituency of Edinburgh East was abolished, and replaced with Edinburgh East and Musselburgh. In June 2024, Sheppard was selected as the SNP candidate for Edinburgh East and Musselburgh at the 2024 general election. He was subsequently defeated by Labour.

== Post-parliamentary career ==
Following his defeat at the 2024 UK General Election, Sheppard attempted to stand to be MSP in the 2026 Holyrood election, but did not get selected. He now works as a columnist at The National.

== Personal life ==
In 2016, he told John Pienaar on BBC Radio 5 Live that he had taken amphetamines and cannabis when he was younger.

Sheppard is a humanist, and in 2022 was elected chair of the All-Party Parliamentary Humanist Group, whose secretariat is provided by Humanists UK. He is also an honorary associate of the National Secular Society.

Sheppard is a co-founder and former manager and promoter of The Stand Comedy Clubs in Edinburgh, Glasgow and Newcastle.

Parliament of the United Kingdom
Preceded by Sheila Gilmore	Member of Parliament for Edinburgh East; 2015–2024	Constituency abolished
