= Mary Fraser Dott =

National Secretary of the Scottish National Party
- In office 1947–1951
- Preceded by: Dr Robert McIntyre
- Succeeded by: Robert Curran

Personal details
- Born: Mary Fraser
- Died: around 1980
- Spouse: George Dott
- Known for: Founding member of the National Party of Scotland and the Scottish National Party

Mary Fraser Dott (died about 1980) was a Scottish nationalist political activist and founding member of the National Party of Scotland and the Scottish National Party. She was a candidate for the Edinburgh East by-election of 1947.

== Political career ==
Mary and her husband George Dott were already Scottish nationalists when, in 1928, they became founder members of the National Party of Scotland; when this merged into the Scottish National Party (SNP), they became founder members of the new party.

From the 1930s, Dott organised the Scottish Literature Society, and under this title, held events at her house in Edinburgh which included readings by people including Hugh MacDiarmid.

In 1946, the SNP's revised policy document was developed and signed by leading party members at the Dott's house, and incorporated some of their ideas, taken from social credit and Georgism. Following this, in 1947, she was appointed as the party's National Secretary. During this time, she attended the 1948 Hague Congress on behalf of the party, and she stood unsuccessfully in the 1947 Edinburgh East by-election, taking 1,682 votes. She was the only woman to stand in a British parliamentary election for the party until Winnie Ewing in 1967.

Although Dott stood down as National Secretary in 1951, she remained active in the party, opposing John MacCormick's Scottish Covenant Association split. She served on the SNP's publicity committee, and was involved in the campaign to have Queen Elizabeth II recognised as the first Elizabeth to rule over Scotland.

In 1962, she gave a speech at Broxburn in support of William Wolfe, where she claimed that Scottish MPs were "afraid of being laughed at" due to their nationalities.

Party political offices
Preceded by Robert McIntyre	National Secretary of the Scottish National Party; 1947–1951	Succeeded by Robert Curran
