= 1945 Edinburgh East by-election =

UK parliamentary by-election

A 1945 by-election for the constituency of Edinburgh East in the United Kingdom House of Commons was held on 3 October 1945, caused by the ennoblement of the incumbent Labour MP Frederick Pethick-Lawrence. The result was a hold for the Labour Party, with their candidate George Thomson.

== Result ==
1945 Edinburgh East by-election
Party	Candidate	Votes	%	±%
Labour	George Thomson	15,482	61.6	+5.2
Conservative	Tam Galbraith	9,665	38.4	+1.1
Majority		5,817	23.2	+4.1
Turnout		25,147		
Labour hold		Swing		

== Previous election ==
General election 1945: Edinburgh East
Party	Candidate	Votes	%	±%
Labour	Frederick Pethick-Lawrence	19,300	56.4	+13.2
Unionist	William Angus Sinclair	12,771	37.3	−2.3
SNP	FC Yeaman	2,149	6.3	New
Majority		6,529	19.1	+15.5
Turnout		34,220	69.6	+1.0
Labour hold		Swing	+7.7	
