= 1899 Edinburgh East by-election =

UK parliamentary by-election

The 1899 Edinburgh East by-election was a parliamentary by-election for the UK House of Commons constituency of Edinburgh East in Edinburgh, Scotland held on 23 June 1899. It was triggered by the death of Liberal MP Robert Wallace. The seat was held by the Liberal Party.

== Previous election ==
1895 general election: Edinburgh East
Party	Candidate	Votes	%	±%
Liberal	Robert Wallace	3,499	53.4	−5.2
Liberal Unionist	Harry G. Younger	3,050	46.6	+5.2
Majority		449	6.8	−10.4
Turnout		6,549	69.4	−7.3
Registered electors		9,437		
Liberal hold		Swing	−5.2	

== Result ==
1899 by-election: Edinburgh East
Party	Candidate	Votes	%	±%
Liberal	George McCrae	4,891	62.3	+8.9
Liberal Unionist	Harry G. Younger	2,961	37.7	−8.9
Majority		1,930	24.6	+17.8
Turnout		7,852	73.2	+3.8
Registered electors		10,730		
Liberal hold		Swing	+8.9	

== See also ==
- Lists of United Kingdom by-elections
