= 1954 Edinburgh East by-election =

UK parliamentary by-election

The 1954 Edinburgh East by-election was held on 8 April 1954. It was held due to the judge appointment to the Court of Session of the incumbent Labour MP, John Thomas Wheatley. It was retained by the Labour candidate, George Willis.

Edinburgh East by-election, 1954 Electorate
Party	Candidate	Votes	%	±%
Labour	George Willis	18,950	57.7	−3.6
Unionist	William Grant	13,922	42.4	+3.5
Majority		5,028	15.4	−7.2
Turnout		32,872	61.8	−22.0
Labour hold		Swing	-3.6	
