= William Angus Sinclair =

Scottish philosopher

- Born: William Angus Sinclair; 1905; England
- Died: 1954 (aged 48–49); Edinburgh

Philosophical work
- Main interests: 20th-century Scottish philosopher
- Notable works: '

Portrait of William Angus Sinclair. Date unknown

William Angus Sinclair OBE TD FRSE DLitt (27 September 1905 – 21 December 1954) was a 20th-century Scottish philosopher.

== Life ==
He was born in Edinburgh on 27 September 1905 the son of Elizabeth Campbell and her husband, Captain John Sinclair of the Mercantile Marine. He was educated at George Watson's College then studied philosophy at the University of Edinburgh, graduating with an MA. In 1932 he began lecturing in logic at the University.

In 1939 he was elected a Fellow of the Royal Society of Edinburgh. His proposers were Norman Kemp Smith, James Pickering Kendall, Ernest Ludlam and Francis Albert Eley Crew.

In World War II he served as a gunnery officer with the Royal Artillery in Italy. In the final year he served as Assistant Adjutant General organising the supply of personnel to the airborne divisions.

Between December 1939 and May 1940 he gave a series of radio talks on the BBC Home Service called The Voice of the Nazi in which he explained the Nazi use of propaganda. These were published in book form in the UK and USA in 1940. His notes, drafts and completed scripts for these talks are available in the National Library of Scotland.

In 1945 he stood as a Conservative candidate in local elections but his politics changed and soon after he affiliated himself to the Labour Party.

He died on 21 December 1954, lost in a snow blizzard in the Cairngorms, while serving in his capacity as a Lt Colonel in the Officer Training Corps section of the Territorial Army whilst trying to reach shelter at the officer training camp in the Grampians. His body was taken to Glenmore Lodge.

== Publications ==
- The Voice of the Nazi (1940)
- Introduction to Philosophy (1944)
- The Traditional Formal Logic (1951)
- Socialism and the Individual (1955 – posthumous publishing)

== Family ==
In August 1954 he married Susan Archer Cameron (d.2010). Her family donated his library to the National Library of Scotland in 2005.

== Memorials ==
The Sinclair Hut or Sinclair Memorial Hall was a shelter bothy at the Chalamain Gap in the Cairngorms erected in his honour by the OTC. The bothy was demolished in 1991, because of continual graffiti.

It is now replaced by a commemorative stone along the Lairig Ghru pass.
