= 1935 in Scotland =

- Centuries: 18th; 19th; 20th; 21st
- Decades: 1910s; 1920s; 1930s; 1940s; 1950s
- See also: List of years in Scotland; Timeline of Scottish history 1935 in: The UK • Wales • Elsewhere; Scottish football: 1934–35 • 1935–36

Events from the year 1935 in Scotland.

== Incumbents ==
- Secretary of State for Scotland and Keeper of the Great Seal – Sir Godfrey Collins

=== Law officers ===
- Lord Advocate – Wilfrid Normand until April; then Douglas Jamieson until December; then Thomas Mackay Cooper
- Solicitor General for Scotland – Douglas Jamieson until April; vacant until May; then Thomas Mackay Cooper until December; then Albert Russell

=== Judiciary ===
- Lord President of the Court of Session and Lord Justice General – Lord Clyde until 1 April; then Lord Normand
- Lord Justice Clerk – Lord Aitchison
- Chairman of the Scottish Land Court – Lord MacGregor Mitchell

== Events ==
- 31 March & 5 December – Glasgow Subway electrified service opened to public on inner and outer circle respectively
- 16 May – Thomas Mackay Cooper becomes Solicitor General for Scotland, replacing Douglas Jamieson
- 22 June – Kerr's Miniature Railway at Arbroath opens for business
- 9 September – Glaswegian flyweight Benny Lynch becomes the first Scottish boxing world champion in a bout in Manchester
- mid–late September – Lancaster general practitioner Buck Ruxton disposes of the bodies of his murder victims near Moffat
- 23 October – a footbridge across the River Forth at Cambuskenneth replaces a ferry
- 2 November – Scottish-born thriller-writer John Buchan, 1st Baron Tweedsmuir, is sworn in as Governor General of Canada
- 14 November – UK General Election: The Communist Party of Great Britain candidate, Willie Gallacher, wins the constituency of West Fife
- 2 December – Albert Russell becomes Solicitor General for Scotland, replacing Thomas Mackay Cooper
- Edwin Muir publishes Scottish Journey

== Births ==
- 5 February – Alex Harvey, glam rock musician (died 1982 in Belgium)
- 21 February – Mark McManus, film and television actor (died 1994)
- 2 March – Jackie Brown, boxer (died 2020)
- 4 March – Nancy Whiskey, born Anne Wilson, folk singer (died 2003 in England)
- 12 April – Keith Moffatt, applied mathematician specialising in magnetohydrodynamics
- 5 May – Eddie Linden, poet and political activist (died 2023)
- 8 May – Lucius Cary, 15th Viscount Falkland, politician
- 9 May – Zander Wedderburn, psychologist (died 2017)
- 7 June – William Stewart, biologist and academic
- 16 July – Douglas Henderson, SNP politician and Member of Parliament 1974–79 (died 2006)
- 10 August – John MacLeod of MacLeod, born John Wolrige-Gordon, clan chief (died 2007 in England)
- 27 August – Eddie Connachan, goalkeeper (died 2021 in South Africa)
- 15 October – Richard McTaggart, boxer
- 23 October – Ewan Hooper, actor
- 22 November – Hugh C. Rae, novelist (died 2014)
- 3 December – Robin Neillands writer specialising in travel and military history (died 2006)
- 26 December – Stevie Chalmers, footballer (died 2019)
- 31 December – Jeff Torrington, novelist (died 2008)
- Jack Alexander of The Alexander Brothers, folk singer (died 2013)
- Donald Forbes, criminal, "Scotland's most dangerous man" (died 2008)
- Hamish MacDonald, impressionist and colourist painter (died 2008)

== Deaths ==
- 12 March – Malcolm Smith, Liberal Party politician and MP (born 1856)
- 16 March – John James Rickard Macleod, recipient of the Nobel Prize in Physiology or Medicine (born 1876)
- 22 April – Frederick Farrell, watercolourist, war artist (born 1882)
- 28 April – Sir Alexander Mackenzie, composer (born 1847)
- 5 June – James Manson, mechanical engineer (born 1845)
- 22 June – George Brisbane Scott Douglas, poet and writer (born 1856 in Gibraltar)
- 27 September – William W. Naismith, mountaineer (born 1856)
- 11 October – Samuel Peploe, painter (born 1871)
- 16 October – Margaret Moyes Black, novelist and biographer (born 1853)
- 22 November – Noel Skelton, Unionist politician, journalist and intellectual (born 1880)

== See also ==
- Timeline of Scottish history
- 1935 in Northern Ireland
