= James Miller (builder) =

Scottish businessman and politician (1905–1977)

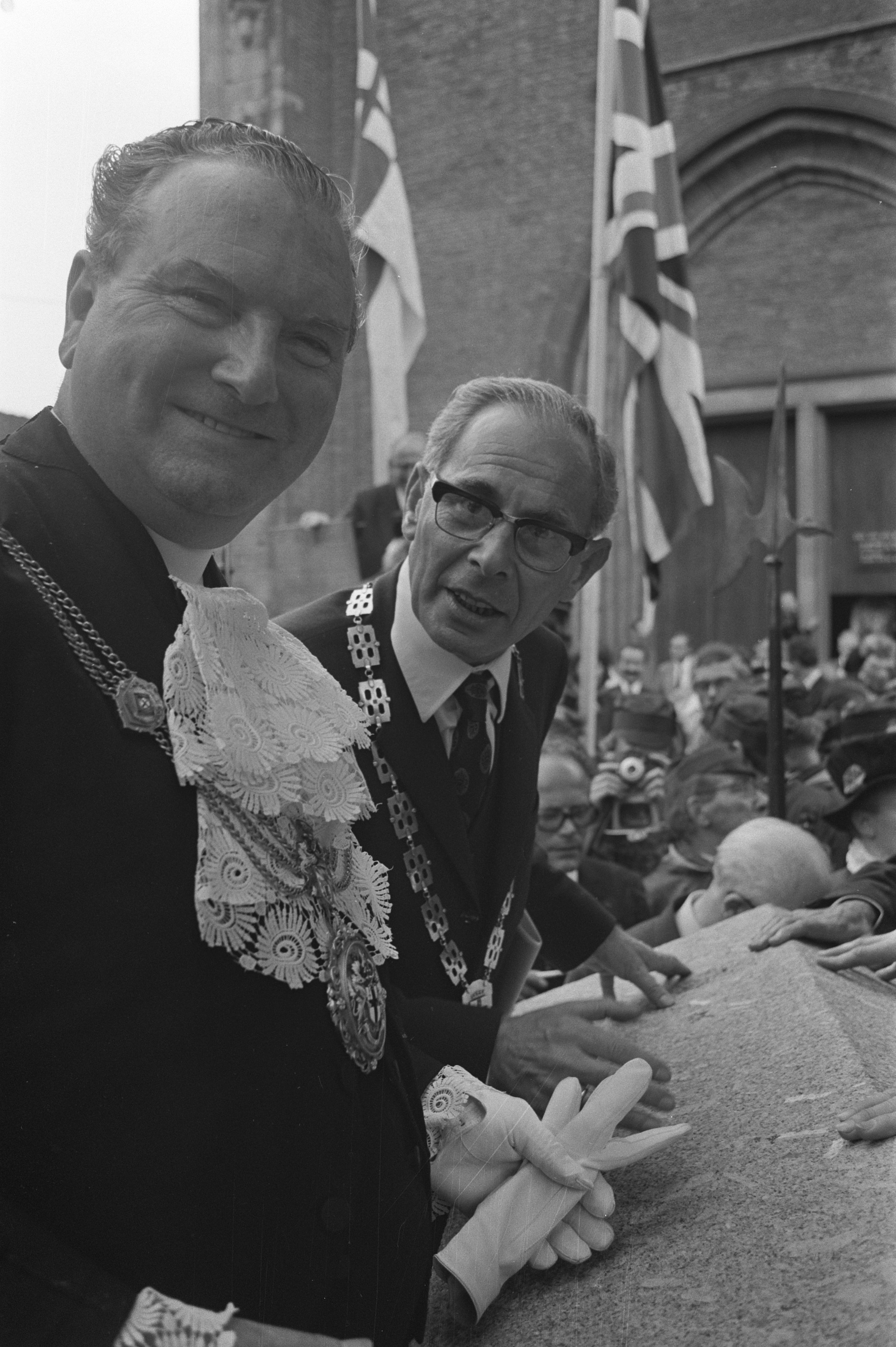
James Miller (left) in the Netherlands (1971), where he was acting Mayor of London at the installation of the London Bridge Monument in Amersfoort. He is pictured with Maurits Troostwijk, Mayor of Amersfoort

Sir James Miller (16 March 1905 – 20 March 1977) was a Scottish businessman and politician, who served as Lord Provost of Edinburgh and Lord Mayor of London. As an architect, engineer and house-builder he founded the firm Miller Homes in 1934.

== Life ==
Miller was born on 16 March 1905, the son of Edinburgh architect James Miller. The family lived at 32 Bellevue Road at this time. He was educated at George Heriot's School. He then trained as an architect under his father. In 1933 he married Ella Jane Stewart.

In 1925, he undertook his first design-build project after a developer withdrew from a project. In 1934, continuing in this vein, he formed James Miller & Partners with his brothers. In post-war Britain his company expanded to cover all sections of the country, and was eventually rebranded as Miller Homes.

In 1936, he became a town councillor in Edinburgh and in 1947 was City Treasurer. From 1951 to 1954, he was Lord Provost of Edinburgh. In 1953, the University of Edinburgh awarded him an honorary doctorate (LLD). Amongst his roles as Lord Provost he was part of BBC Scotland's first broadcast on 14 March 1952. Miller appeared alongside presenters Mary Malcolm and Alastair Macintyre.

In 1955, he was elected a Fellow of the Royal Society of Edinburgh. His proposers were Charles Warr, Douglas Allan, Hugh Nisbet and Robert Lyon. In 1956 he was painted by William Oliphant Hutchison. The painting is held by the City of Edinburgh Council.

In 1964, he was elected Lord Mayor of London. In 1967 he funded the training ship Malcolm Miller in memory of his son Malcolm who had been killed in a car accident in 1965.

He retired as Director of Miller Homes in 1970 and was succeeded by his son James Miller. His nephew, Keith Miller, became Chief Executive.

He died on 20 March 1977.

Civic offices
Preceded by Andrew Hunter Arbuthnot Murray	Lord Provost of Edinburgh; 1951–1954	Succeeded by John Garnett Banks
Preceded by Sir James Harman	Lord Mayor of London; 1964-1965	Succeeded by Sir Lionel Denny
