= Alastair Macintyre =

Scottish broadcaster (1913–1979)

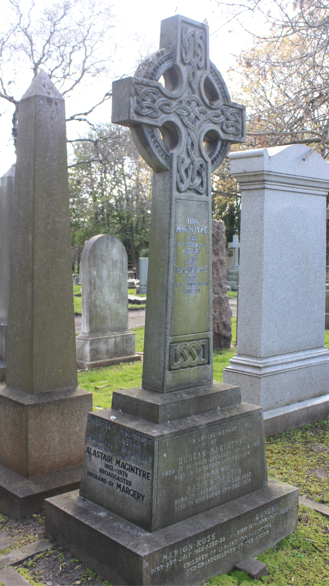
The grave of Alastair Macintyre, Warriston Cemetery

Alastair Macintyre (1913–1979) was a Scottish broadcaster. He was the announcer on BBC Scotland Television News and the first presenter of STV News. He was later Senior Announcer for BBC Scotland. He was also an occasional actor, sometimes in the capacity of a cameo role.

== Life ==
He was born on 20 December 1913 the son of Ian Macintyre of Camus na h'Erie WS (1869–1946) and his wife Ida van der Gucht. He was educated at Fettes College in Edinburgh, then studied at Gonville and Caius College, Cambridge, at the same time as one of his peers from school, the future Chancellor of the Exchequer, Iain Macleod. His father was the Unionist Party MP for West Edinburgh from 1924 to 1929 and also a renowned rugby player.

In the Second World War he served with the Royal Scots at the rank of Major.

On 14 March 1952 Macintyre was the first announcer for BBC Scotland (alongside Mary Malcolm), and wore a kilt for the occasion. The live broadcast, from BBC Scotland, Studio 1 on Queen Street, Edinburgh was enabled by the commissioning that day of the Kirk o' Shotts transmitting station. This programme also featured Edinburgh's Lord Provost, James Miller. It marked a sharp rise in TV sales immediately thereafter.

On 30 August 1957 was the first newsreader on Scottish Television News. On 17 April 1954 he made his first live sports broadcast, covering the Hawick Rugby seven-a-side tournament alongside Bill McLaren.

He died in Taunton in Somerset in 1979 but is buried with his parents in Warriston Cemetery

== Family ==
In 1939 he was married to Margery Constance Grant-Morris (d.1978).

== Filmography ==
see

- Who Goes Next? as Lt. Mackenzie (1938)
- The Arsenal Stadium Mystery as Carter (1939)
- Another World: as Voice (1948) with Stanhope Forbes
- The Kilt is my Delight (presenter, 1956 to 1963 TV series)
