= John Barrett (Scottish politician) =

Scottish Liberal Democrat politician (born 1954)

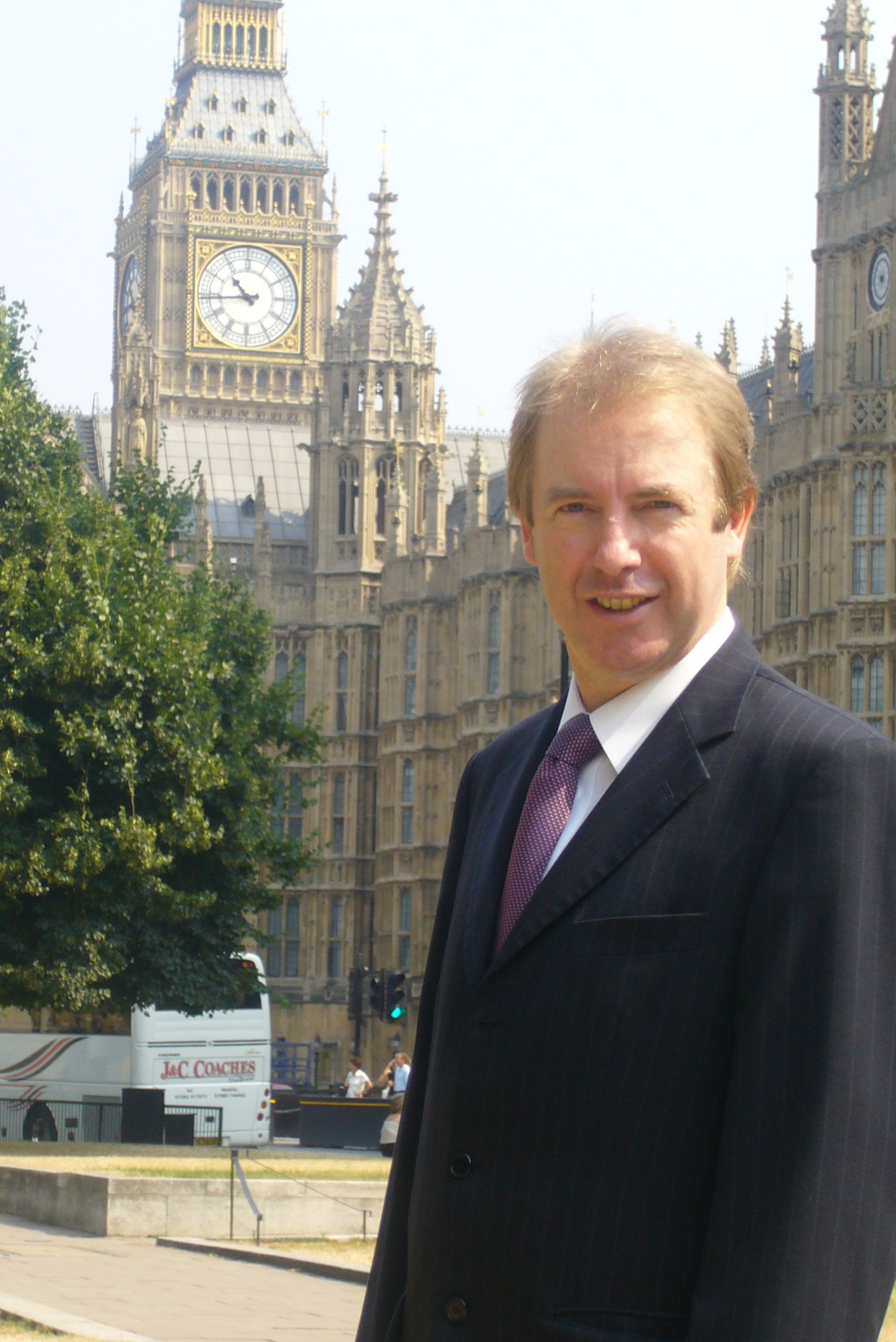

Member of Parliament for Edinburgh West
- In office 7 June 2001 – 12 April 2010
- Preceded by: Donald Gorrie
- Succeeded by: Mike Crockart

Personal details
- Born: 11 February 1954 (age 72) Hobart, Tasmania, Australia
- Party: Liberal Democrat
- Spouse: Carol
- Children: 1 daughter
- Education: Napier Polytechnic

John Andrew Barrett (born 11 February 1954) is a Scottish Liberal Democrat politician and the former Member of Parliament (MP) for Edinburgh West.

== Background and early career ==
Barrett was born in Hobart, Tasmania, Australia.

John Barrett was educated at the Forrester High School in Edinburgh, Telford College and Napier Polytechnic (Now Napier University). He also attended Cornell University (New York State) summer sessions in Development Communication and returned to Cornell as a teaching assistant.

He joined the Scottish Liberal Party in 1980 and was the election agent for Veronica Crerar when she won the South East Corstorphine ward in 1984. He was also the election agent at council and parliamentary elections for Donald Gorrie. John Barrett was elected to the City of Edinburgh Council for South-East Corstorphine ward in 1995 and was elected Chairman of the Liberal Democrat Group from 1995 to 2001. He was the election agent for Donald Gorrie in Edinburgh West when the Liberal Democrats won the seat from the Conservatives at the 1997 General Election.

He married Carol , a graduate of Edinburgh College of Art and well known wildlife artist. They have one daughter, Sarah, and two granddaughters, Maria and Hope. They live in Edinburgh.

== Parliamentary career ==
In 2000, Donald Gorrie decided to stand down from House of Commons to concentrate on the Scottish Parliament. John Barrett won the nomination to defend Edinburgh West at the 2001 general election, which he did by 7,589 votes. He made his maiden speech in the House of Commons on 13 July 2001. John Barrett sat on the International Development Select Committee between 2001 and 2007, and was made a party spokesman on International Development in 2003. He was promoted by Charles Kennedy in December 2005 to Shadow Minister of State for Scotland, while continuing as a spokesman on International Development. Since 2008 he has also been a spokesman on Work and Pensions with a focus on disability issues.

Barrett has fought prominent campaigns; for Trade Justice, against Post Office closures, opposing the war in Iraq, supporting renewables and opposing nuclear power, against the replacement of Trident and for a number of animal welfare issues alongside the Scottish SPCA, including one to ban the trade in cat and dog fur.

Following the boundary changes in 2005, Edinburgh West now included the areas of Stenhouse and Murrayfield. He was re-elected in the 2005 general election, with a majority of 13,600 over the nearest (Conservative) candidate, making Edinburgh West the second safest Lib-Dem seat in the UK, a seat which the Lib Dems had won for the first time only eight years before.

Barrett is a founding member of the Beveridge Group within the Liberal Democrats. He is also the President of the Scottish Liberal Club, serves on the Scottish and Federal Liberal Democrat national executive committees, is leading the party's legacy programme in Scotland and continues to campaign for the Liberal Democrats.

Outside politics he is a director of ABC Productions and worked with Atlantic Screen Music. He was involved with a number of charities working in the developing world – including India 800 and as an ambassador for CBM UK. He trained parliamentarians in emerging democracies with the Westminster Foundation for Democracy, was on the Advisory Council of the Edinburgh International Film Festival and was also a member of the Royal Bank of Scotland's Microfinance Advisory Board.

On 25 July 2009, Barrett announced that he would be standing down from Parliament at the 2010 general election. In only two seats in the UK, Edinburgh West and Cambridge, were retiring Liberal Democrats able to successfully see their own party hold on to their seats. He was succeeded as MP for Edinburgh West by fellow Liberal Democrat Mike Crockart.

== Since leaving Parliament ==
In an article in January 2014, Barrett condemned the policies of the Liberal Democrats in coalition with the Tories at Westminster, saying "No wonder the public in Scotland drifted away in large numbers from the party at both the last set of Holyrood and council elections."

He is no longer actively involved in party politics but continues to support a number of causes and contributes to the debate on issues he supports. He has organised a number of fundraising concerts to support a range of local, national and international issues, such as the funding of a local youth and community centre, supporting a number of cancer charities and funding support for families in Ukraine following the Russian invasion in February 2022. He is also a published author of a work of fiction, The Mayor of Kalymnos.

Parliament of the United Kingdom
Preceded by Donald Gorrie	Member of Parliament for Edinburgh West; 2001–2010	Succeeded by Mike Crockart
