= Miller Homes =

UK business

Miller Homes Limited
- Type: Private company
- Industry: Housebuilding
- Founded: 1934
- Headquarters: Edinburgh, Scotland, UK
- Area served: United Kingdom
- Parent: Apollo Global Management (2022-present)
- Website: millerhomes.co.uk

Miller Homes Limited is a privately held housebuilding company based in the United Kingdom.

== History ==
The company was established by Sir James Miller in 1934. Expansion led to James' brothers, John and Lawrence, joining him in the business. Miller soon became Edinburgh's leading housebuilder, building close to five hundred houses per year during the 1930s.

The outbreak of the Second World War led to the company's abrupt cessation of private housebuilding and the start of Miller's construction business, which continued to grow following the end of the conflict. The peacetime return to house construction was largely driven by local authority schemes; it was not until the end of building controls in the beginning of the 1950s that Miller Homes resumed private housing – often using its extensive pre-war land holdings.

Housing operations were later extended to the South East England and Yorkshire.

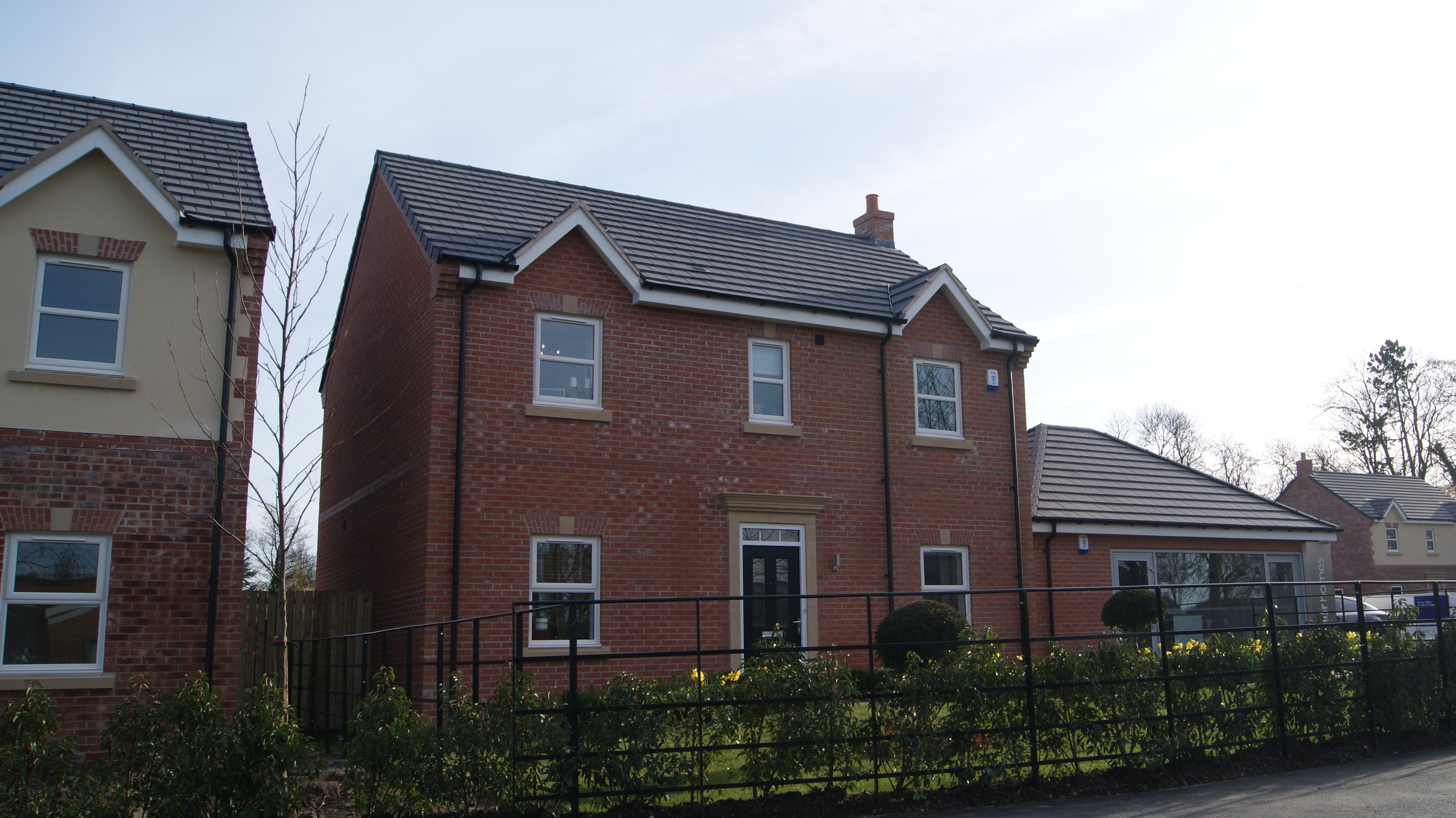
Privas Court, a housing development in Wetherby, West Yorkshire seen here under construction in March 2016.

During May 1996, the company's housing subsidiary in the South of England was sold to Kier Group in exchange for £16 million. By this point, Miller Homes was the largest private construction firm in Scotland.

During the late 1990s, sales exceeded 1,000 units for the first time. The company's senior management declared their intention for Miller Homes to move into the top ten housebuilders in Britain. During 1999, the company acquired rival housebuilder Cussins Homes while both Birch Homes and the Yorkshire region of Crest Nicholson were purchased during the following year. During April 1999, Miller had also launched a bid to acquire rival house builder Cala Homes to create Britain's largest privately owned house builder.

In September 2005, the company acquired Fairclough Homes (then building 1,500 houses per year) in exchange for £246 million, which took Miller Homes to its target of 4,000 houses per year and put it into the top ten largest house builders. Shortly thereafter, Miller Homes underwent a restructure of its nationwide operations.

During the Great Recession, volumes fell substantially due to the poor economic conditions. In September 2010, Miller Homes recorded a pre-tax loss of £27 million, some of which was attributed to the costly debts it was carrying. In April 2011, shortly after rival firm McInerney Holdings' entry into administration, Miller Homes secured a management contract valued at £100 million relating to ten sites previously owned by the failed company. Later that same year, the firm launched a partnership with the City of Edinburgh Council to speedily deliver affordable housing.

In July 2014, the company sold its construction division to Galliford Try. That same year, Miller Homes abandoned a planned floatation on the London Stock Exchange which it had intended to raise about £140m in exchange for a 40 per cent stake in the company. Despite this, the firm's management team continued to express interest in a potential floatation in the following years. During September 2015, Miller Homes announced revenues of £229.7 million over last six month trading period, a 32 per cent year-on-year increase.

In August 2017, Miller Homes was purchased by the European private investment firm Bridgepoint Group via a deal valued at £655 million. During the previous year, it had sold 2,380 homes and reported an operating profit of £103 million, a 31 per cent year-on-year increase. In May 2021, as part of the firm's wider expansion plans to deliver 5,000 homes per year, Miller Homes purchased Wallace Land Investments to add 41 sites and 17,500 plots to its strategic land bank.

During April 2022, the company was acquired by the American asset management firm Apollo Global Management in exchange for roughly £1.3 billion. One year later, it was announced that a £160 million profit had been recorded, a year-on-year rise of 10 per cent.

In December 2024, Miller agreed a deal to buy housebuilder St Modwen Homes (part of the Blackstone-owned St. Modwen Properties group) in a deal worth around £215 million, subject to regulatory approval in early 2025. Acquiring the £371m-turnover housebuilder would give Miller a presence in southwest England, and take Miller towards its target of building 6,000 homes a year.

In September 2026, Japanese construction firm Daiwa House acquired a 30% stake in Miller Homes from Apollo, which retains control of the business. Miller planned to increase completions to 7,000 homes a year.
