= Angus MacDonald (SNP politician) =

Scottish politician (born 1963)

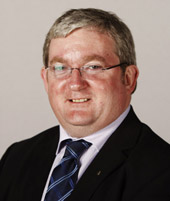

Member of the Scottish Parliament for Falkirk East
- In office 5 May 2011 – 5 May 2021
- Preceded by: Cathy Peattie
- Succeeded by: Michelle Thomson

Personal details
- Born: Stornoway, Scotland
- Party: Scottish National Party

Angus MacDonald JP DL (born 11 October 1963) is a former Scottish National Party (SNP) politician. He was the Member of the Scottish Parliament (MSP) for Falkirk East from 2011 to 2021.

== Early life ==
MacDonald was born on 11 October 1963 in Stornoway. He was educated at Grangemouth High School, Keil School, the College of Estate Management and the Centre for Industrial Studies. He was a member of Falkirk District Council 1992–1996 and was also a Justice of the Peace during the same period.

== Political career ==
He was elected a Scottish National Party Councillor to Falkirk Council for the Inchyra Ward in a by-election on 16 December 2004, with 56% of the vote.

In 2011 He was elected to serve the Falkirk East constituency, gaining over 50% of the vote, ousting Labour's Cathy Peattie who had been the MSP since 1999. During the fourth Parliament he was a Member of the Economy, Energy & Tourism Committee, the Public Petitions Committee, the Scottish Commission for Public Audit and the Cross Party Group on Gaelic.

He was re-elected in 2016. He stepped down at the 2021 Scottish Parliament election.

== Other activities ==
He has served as a Governor of the Stirlingshire Educational Trust and Convener of An Comunn Gaidhealach (Falkirk Branch). In addition he was Chairman of the Mod 2008 Falkirk organising committee, co-ordinating plans for the Royal National Mòd which was held in Falkirk district in October 2008.

Scottish Parliament
Preceded by Cathy Peattie	Member of the Scottish Parliament for Falkirk East; 2011–2021	Succeeded by Michelle Thomson
