= Ian Clark Hutchison =

Scottish Unionist Party politician

Sir George Ian Clark Hutchison (4 January 1903 – 2 February 2002) was a Scottish Unionist Party politician. He was the Member of Parliament (MP) for Edinburgh West from 1941 to 1959.

He was the son of George Aitken Clark Hutchison MP and his wife Peggy Blair who lived at Afton Lodge on Ferry Road in the Trinity district of Edinburgh.

He was educated at Edinburgh Academy then attended the Royal Navy Colleges at both Osbourne and Dartmouth. He joined the Royal Navy as a cadet in 1916 and specialised in the use of torpedoes.

As a politician he championed free school meals and served the Public Assistance Committee 1937 to 1939. He was recalled to the Royal Navy in 1939 at the outbreak of war and served the rare dual functions of being both on active service and being an elected MP from 1941 to 1944.

He was a member of the Royal Company of Archers and served as Deputy Lieutenant for Edinburgh. He was knighted by Queen Elizabeth II in 1954. He was a governor of Donaldson's School for the Deaf in west Edinburgh and served on the executive council of the British Legion.

He died on 2 February 2002 aged 99. His wife Sheena predeceased him but he was survived by his daughter Ailie.

Parliament of the United Kingdom
Preceded by Thomas Cooper	Member of Parliament for Edinburgh West; 1941–1959	Succeeded by Anthony Stodart
