= John Garnett Banks =

Scottish businessman and politician

Sir John Garnett Banks (9 May 1889 – 2 May 1974) was a Scottish businessman and local politician who served as Lord Provost of Edinburgh from 1954 to 1957.

== Life ==
He was born in Edinburgh on 9 May 1889 the son of Elizabeth Forrest Grieve and John Garnett Banks.

In 1932, he was working as a house valuer in Edinburgh. He joined Edinburgh Town council in 1936 and served as Treasurer of the city 1950 to 1953. In 1954, he was elected Lord Provost in succession to Sir James Miller.

He was knighted by Queen Elizabeth II in the 1956 New Year Honours.

The University of Edinburgh awarded him an honorary doctorate (LLD) later that year.

As Lord Provost he oversaw the closure of the original Edinburgh tram system in 1956, as it was considered too inflexible compared with buses. In the same year he represented the city when Arthur Bliss presented his composition "Edinburgh" to the city.

In office his main duties included agreeing to the "slum clearances" on the Canongate and the centre of Leith. It was one of the main periods of expansion of "council housing" under the umbrella of Homes for Heroes. Large areas of land were used for developing well-laid out two and three storey buildings throughout the city.

== Death ==
He died on 2 May 1974, aged 83.

== Family ==
In 1952, he married, secondly, to Margaret Wallace Macdonald of Blairgowrie.

== Artistic recognition ==
He was portrayed in his ceremonial robes by Stanley Cursiter. The portrait is held by the City Art Centre but rarely displayed.
