= Anthony Stodart, Baron Stodart of Leaston =

Scottish Conservative politician

The Right Honourable The Lord Stodart of Leaston PC

Member of the House of Lords
- Lord Temporal
- Life peerage 1 June 1981 – 31 May 2003

Member of Parliament for Edinburgh West
- In office 8 October 1959 – 20 September 1974
- Preceded by: Ian Clark Hutchison
- Succeeded by: James Douglas-Hamilton

Personal details
- Born: 6 June 1916
- Died: 31 May 2003 (aged 86)
- Party: Unionist

James Anthony Stodart, Baron Stodart of Leaston PC (6 June 1916 – 31 May 2003) was a Scottish Conservative politician.

== Political career ==
=== First political aspirations ===
Although he was an active Unionist in his youth, he fell out with the party and joined the Liberal Party, standing as their candidate in Berwick and East Lothian at the 1950 general election.

By the following year, Stodart had returned to the Tory fold and was Unionist candidate for Midlothian and Peebles at the 1951 snap election and for Midlothian in 1955.

=== Member of Parliament (1959–1974) ===
At the 1959 general election, he was elected as Member of Parliament (MP) for Edinburgh West, which he held until the October 1974 general election, when he was succeeded by fellow Conservative Lord James Douglas-Hamilton.

Stodart served as a junior Scottish Office Minister under Sir Alec Douglas-Home from 1963 to 1964, and at the Ministry of Agriculture under the leadership of Edward Heath, from 1970 to 1974.

=== Out of parliament ===
He became chairman of the Agriculture Credit Corporation from 1975 to 1987 and chaired an inquiry into Scottish local government in 1980.

=== Member of the House of Lords (1981–2003) ===
After leaving the House of Commons, he was created a life peer as Baron Stodart of Leaston, of Humbie in the District of East Lothian on 1 June 1981.

== Personal life ==
The son of a colonel in the Indian medical service, he took over the family farm at Kingston, North Berwick, East Lothian, after his father died when he was just eighteen years old. Eventually, he farmed more than 800 acres (3.2 km^{2}) at Leaston, near Humbie, East Lothian.

His wife Hazel died in 1995. They had no children.

Parliament of the United Kingdom
Preceded by Ian Clark Hutchison	Member of Parliament for Edinburgh West; 1959 – Oct 1974	Succeeded by Lord James Douglas-Hamilton
