= Edinburgh West (UK Parliament constituency) =

British parliamentary constituency in Scotland

Coordinates: 55°57′09″N 3°19′58″W

- Burgh constituency for the House of Commons
- Interactive map of boundaries from 2024
- Location within Scotland
- Subdivision: City of Edinburgh
- Electorate: 76,723 (March 2020)
- Major settlements: Edinburgh (part) and South Queensferry

Current constituency
- Created: 1885
- Member of Parliament: Christine Jardine (Liberal Democrats)
- Created from: Edinburgh

Edinburgh West is a burgh constituency of the House of Commons of the Parliament of the United Kingdom, first contested at the 1885 general election. (Note: As with all extant examples of constituencies nationwide (since 1955) it elects one Member of Parliament (MP) by the first past the post system of election.) It has been represented since 2017 by Christine Jardine of the Liberal Democrats.

Prior to the 2005 general election, the boundaries were the same as the Edinburgh West Scottish Parliament constituency, created in 1999, later replaced by the Edinburgh Western Scottish Parliament constituency.

== History ==
This commuter belt seat, distinctively in the city, was Unionist/Conservative for over 65 years, from the 1931 general election until the 1997 general election, although the Liberal/SDP Alliance and later the Liberal Democrats repeatedly came close to winning in the 1980s and early 1990s. By the time of the 2024 general election, the Conservatives had dropped to fourth place with just 5.5% of the vote.

After 1997, the seat was held by the Liberal Democrats until the 2015 general election. The Member of Parliament (MP) between the 2015 and 2017 general elections was Michelle Thomson, who was elected for the Scottish National Party (SNP) in May 2015. In September 2015, she resigned the party whip and sat as an independent. Thomson chose not to seek reelection either for the SNP or as an independent candidate. At the 2017 general election, Christine Jardine of the Liberal Democrats gained the seat with a majority of 2,988 votes. Jardine held the seat in 2019 with a slightly increased margin, and again in 2024, when her majority increased to 16,470 votes (31.4%).

Up to 2024, the seat had been relative to others a marginal seat since 2005, as the winner's majority had not exceeded 8.2% of the vote since the 30% majority won in that year. The seat has changed hands twice electorally since that year and once through resigning the party whip.

== Constituency profile ==
This is an affluent, left-leaning and pro-European seat covering the northwestern portion of Edinburgh. It is mostly suburban, but takes in rural areas within the council area including Kirkliston and South Queensferry. Edinburgh Airport and Murrayfield Stadium are within the seat.

== Boundaries ==
The seat was created when the Edinburgh constituency was abolished, in 1885, replaced by four seats: Edinburgh East, Edinburgh Central, Edinburgh South and Edinburgh West. The Central constituency was abolished in 2005. The East constituency was replaced by Edinburgh East and Musselburgh from 1997 to 2005 and again from 2024. The South and West constituencies have been in continuous use (with alterations to boundaries) since 1885.

1885–1918: The St. Andrew, St. Stephen, St. Bernard and St. Luke wards of the municipal burgh of Edinburgh.

1918–1950: The Dalry, Gorgie, Haymarket and St. Bernard's wards of the county of the city of Edinburgh.

1950–1955: The Corstorphine, Murrayfield-Cramond, St. Bernard's and Pilton wards of the county of the city of Edinburgh.

1955–1974: The Corstorphine (with the exception of the area added by the Edinburgh Corporation Order Confirmation Act 1954), Murrayfield-Cramond, and Pilton wards of the county of the city of Edinburgh, and part of the St. Bernard's ward.

1974–1983: The Corstorphine and Murrayfield-Cramond wards of the county of the city of Edinburgh, and that part of Pilton ward which is not included in the Edinburgh Leith constituency.

1983–1997: Electoral divisions 11 (Cramond/Parkgrove), 15 (Corstorphine North), 16 (Telford/Blackhall), 19 (Corstorphine South) and 26 (Moat/Stenhouse) in the City of Edinburgh.

1997–2005: Electoral divisions 11 (Queensferry/Kirkliston), 12 (Cramond/Blackhall), 13 (Drylaw/Muirhouse), 16 (Corstorphine North), and 21 (Corstorphine South) in the City of Edinburgh.

2005–2024: Under the Fifth Review of UK Parliament constituencies, the constituency boundaries were defined in accordance with the ward structure in place on 30 November 2004 and contained the City of Edinburgh wards of Cramond, Dalmeny and Kirkliston, Davidson's Mains, East Craigs, Gyle, Muirhouse and Drylaw, Murrayfield, North East Corstorphine, Queensferry, South East Corstorphine and Stenhouse.

Before the 2005 general election, the seat was one of six covering the City of Edinburgh council area. Five were entirely within the city council area. One, Edinburgh East and Musselburgh, straddled the boundary with the East Lothian council area to take in Musselburgh. Constituency boundaries were revised for the 2005 election: Edinburgh West was enlarged, to include an area formerly within Edinburgh Central, and became one of five seats covering the city area.

Further to the Local Governance (Scotland) Act 2004, the ward structure in the City of Edinburgh was changed. Consequently, from 2007, none of the new Edinburgh wards were wholly within the constituency. After further minor changes in 2017, the constituency contained the whole of the Almond ward, and Drum Brae/Gyle and Corstorphine/Murrayfield were almost entirely within it, together with a minority of Inverleith and small sections of Pentland Hills, City Centre and Sighthill/Gorgie.

2024–present: Further to the 2023 review of Westminster constituencies which came into effect for the 2024 general election, the boundary with the neighbouring constituency of Edinburgh North and Leith was revised. The remainder of the Corstorphine/Murrayfield ward was transferred from Edinburgh North and Leith, along with a further part of the Inverleith ward. To partly compensate, the eastern-most part of the Almond ward was moved in the opposite direction. The constituency now covers the following wards or part wards of the City of Edinburgh:

- The bulk of Almond ward - except the Muirhouse area;
- a small part of Pentland Hills ward, comprising Ratho and surrounding rural areas;
- the bulk of Drum Brae/Gyle ward;
- western areas of Inverleith ward, comprising about half its electorate;
- the whole of Corstorphine/Murrayfield ward;
- a small part of Sighthill/Gorgie ward; and
- the western-most part of City Centre ward, comprising the West Coates area.

== Members of Parliament ==
Year	Member	Party
1885	Thomas Buchanan	Liberal
1886	Thomas Buchanan	Liberal Unionist
1888 by-election	Thomas Buchanan	Liberal
1892	Viscount Wolmer	Liberal Unionist
1895 by-election	Lewis McIver	Liberal Unionist
1909 by-election	James Avon Clyde	Liberal Unionist
1912	James Avon Clyde	Unionist
1918	John Gordon Jameson	Coalition Conservative
1922	Vivian Phillipps	Liberal
1924	Ian MacIntyre	Unionist
1929	George Mathers	Labour
1931	Wilfrid Guild Normand	Unionist
1935 by-election	Thomas Mackay Cooper	Unionist
1941 by-election	Ian Clark Hutchison	Unionist
1959	Anthony Stodart	Unionist
1965	Anthony Stodart	Conservative
Oct 1974	Lord James Douglas-Hamilton	Conservative
1997	Donald Gorrie	Liberal Democrat
2001	John Barrett	Liberal Democrat
2010	Mike Crockart	Liberal Democrat
2015	Michelle Thomson	SNP
2015	Michelle Thomson	Independent
2017	Christine Jardine	Liberal Democrat

== Election results ==
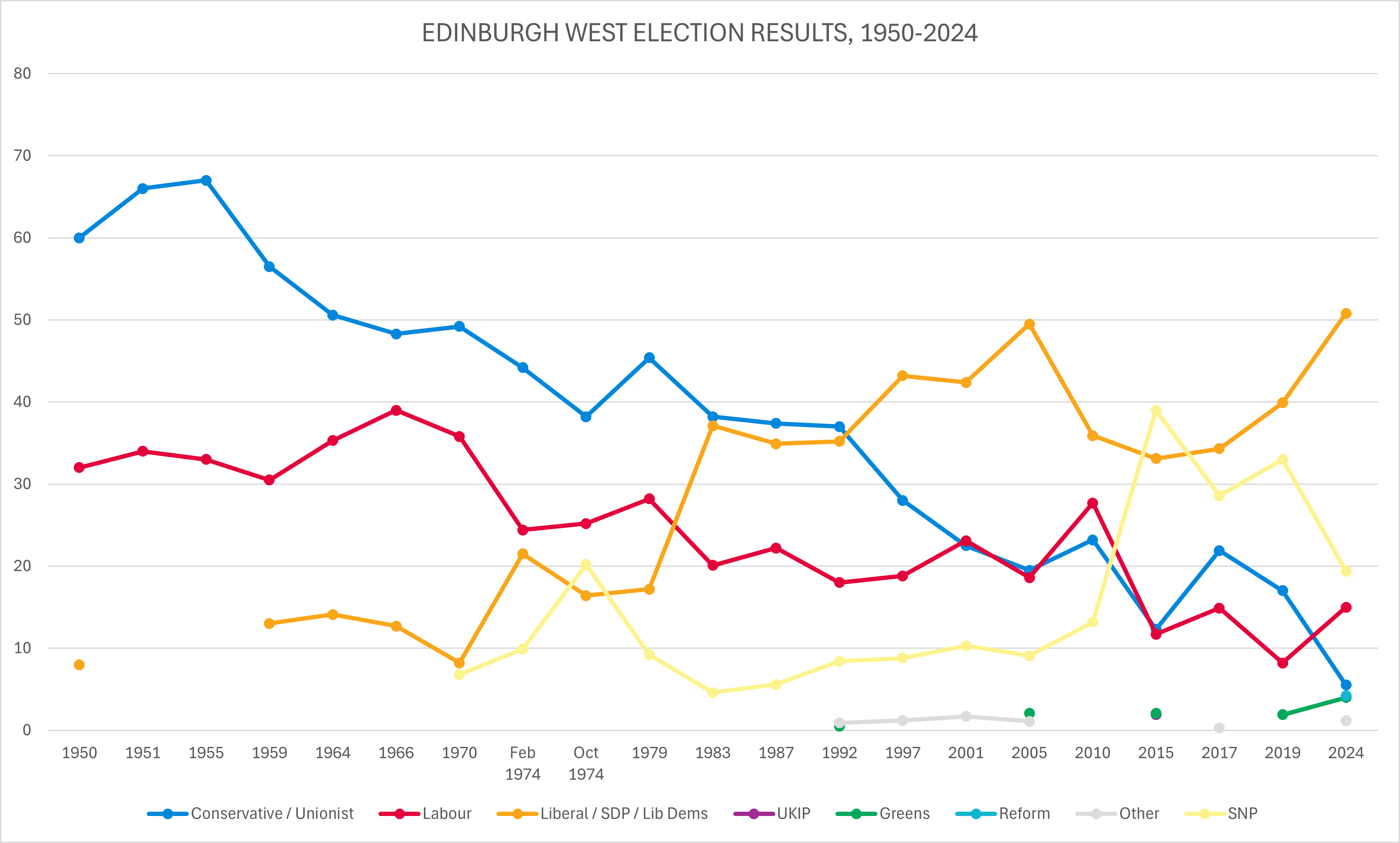
Election results 1950-2024

=== Elections in the 2020s ===
General election 2024: Edinburgh West
Party	Candidate	Votes	%	±%
Liberal Democrats	Christine Jardine	26,645	50.8	+12.6
SNP	Euan Hyslop	10,175	19.4	−13.6
Labour	Michael Davidson	7,854	15.0	+6.3
Conservative	Alastair Shields	2,897	5.5	−12.5
Reform	Otto Inglis	2,209	4.2	+4.1
Green	James Puchowski	2,100	4.0	+2.0
Independent	David Henry	363	0.7	N/A
Independent	Nick Hornig	143	0.3	N/A
Scottish Libertarian	Tam Laird	85	0.2	N/A
Majority		16,470	31.4	+26.2
Turnout		52,471	68.6	−3.1
Registered electors		76,490		
Liberal Democrats hold		Swing	+13.1	

=== Elections in the 2010s ===
2019 notional result (Note: Estimate of the 2019 general election result as if the revised boundaries recommended under the 2023 boundary review were in place)
Party	Vote	%
Liberal Democrats	21,037	38.2
SNP	18,149	33.0
Conservative	9,922	18.0
Labour	4,787	8.7
Scottish Greens	1,079	2.0
Brexit Party	50	0.1
Majority	2,888	5.2
Turnout	55,024	71.7
Electorate	76,723	

General election 2019: Edinburgh West
Party	Candidate	Votes	%	±%
Liberal Democrats	Christine Jardine	21,766	39.9	+5.6
SNP	Sarah Masson	17,997	33.0	+4.4
Conservative	Graham Hutchison	9,283	17.0	−4.9
Labour	Craig Bolton	4,460	8.2	−6.7
Green	Elaine Gunn	1,027	1.9	N/A
Majority		3,769	6.9	+1.2
Turnout		54,533	75.2	+1.4
Registered electors		72,507		
Liberal Democrats hold		Swing	+0.6	

General election 2017: Edinburgh West
Party	Candidate	Votes	%	±%
Liberal Democrats	Christine Jardine	18,108	34.3	+1.2
SNP	Toni Giugliano	15,120	28.6	−10.4
Conservative	Sandy Batho	11,559	21.9	+9.6
Labour	Mandy Telford	7,876	14.9	+3.2
Scotland's Independence Referendum Party	Mark Whittet	132	0.3	N/A
Majority		2,988	5.7	N/A
Turnout		52,795	73.8	−2.7
Registered electors		c.71,500		
Liberal Democrats gain from SNP		Swing	+5.8	

General election 2015: Edinburgh West
Party	Candidate	Votes	%	±%
SNP	Michelle Thomson	21,378	39.0	+25.8
Liberal Democrats	Mike Crockart	18,168	33.1	−2.8
Conservative	Lindsay Paterson	6,732	12.3	−10.9
Labour	Cameron Day	6,425	11.7	−16.0
Green	Pat Black	1,140	2.1	N/A
UKIP	Otto Inglis	1,015	1.9	N/A
Majority		3,210	5.9	N/A
Turnout		54,858	76.5	+5.2
SNP gain from Liberal Democrats		Swing	+14.3	

General election 2010: Edinburgh West
Party	Candidate	Votes	%	±%
Liberal Democrats	Mike Crockart	16,684	35.9	−13.6
Labour	Cameron Day	12,881	27.7	+9.1
Conservative	Stewart Geddes	10,767	23.2	+3.7
SNP	Sheena M. Cleland	6,115	13.2	+4.1
Majority		3,803	8.2	−21.8
Turnout		46,447	71.3	+2.4
Liberal Democrats hold		Swing	−11.4	

=== Elections in the 2000s ===
General election 2005: Edinburgh West
Party	Candidate	Votes	%	±%
Liberal Democrats	John Barrett	22,417	49.5	+11.2
Conservative	David A. Brogan	8,817	19.5	−2.2
Labour	Navraj Singh Ghaleigh	8,433	18.6	−7.9
SNP	Sheena M. Cleland	4,124	9.1	−1.6
Green	Ailsa Spindler	964	2.1	N/A
Scottish Socialist	Gary P. Clark	510	1.1	−1.0
Majority		13,600	30.0	+10.7
Turnout		45,265	68.9	+5.7
Liberal Democrats hold		Swing	+6.7	

General election 2001: Edinburgh West
Party	Candidate	Votes	%	±%
Liberal Democrats	John Barrett	16,719	42.4	−0.8
Labour	Elspeth Alexandra	9,130	23.1	+4.3
Conservative	Iain Whyte	8,894	22.5	−5.5
SNP	Alyn Smith	4,047	10.3	+1.5
Scottish Socialist	Bill Scott	688	1.7	N/A
Majority		7,589	19.3	+4.1
Turnout		39,478	63.2	−14.7
Liberal Democrats hold		Swing	+2.6	

=== Elections in the 1990s ===
General election 1997: Edinburgh West
Party	Candidate	Votes	%	±%
Liberal Democrats	Donald Gorrie	20,578	43.2	+13.3
Conservative	James Douglas-Hamilton	13,325	28.0	−10.2
Labour	Lesley Hinds	8,948	18.8	+1.4
SNP	Graham D. Sutherland	4,210	8.8	−3.7
Referendum	Stephen C. Elphick	277	0.6	N/A
Liberal	Paul N. Coombes	263	0.5	−0.1
Independent	Antony C.O. Jack	30	0.1	N/A
Majority		7,253	15.2	N/A
Turnout		47,631	77.9	−2.7
Liberal Democrats gain from Conservative		Swing	+11.8	

General election 1992: Edinburgh West
Party	Candidate	Votes	%	±%
Conservative	James Douglas-Hamilton	18,071	37.0	−0.4
Liberal Democrats	Donald Gorrie	17,192	35.2	+0.3
Labour	Irene A. Kitson	8,759	18.0	−4.2
SNP	Graham D. Sutherland	4,117	8.4	+2.8
Liberal	Alan R. Fleming	272	0.6	N/A
Green	Linda Hendry	234	0.5	N/A
BNP	David J. Bruce	133	0.3	N/A
Majority		879	1.8	−0.7
Turnout		48,778	82.6	+3.2
Conservative hold		Swing	−0.4	

=== Elections in the 1980s ===
General election 1987: Edinburgh West
Party	Candidate	Votes	%	±%
Conservative	James Douglas-Hamilton	18,450	37.4	−0.8
Liberal	Derek G. King	17,216	34.9	−2.2
Labour	Michael McGregor	10,957	22.2	+2.1
SNP	Norman Irons	2,774	5.6	+1.0
Majority		1,234	2.5	+1.4
Turnout		49,397	79.4	+3.7
Conservative hold		Swing	+0.7	

General election 1983: Edinburgh West
Party	Candidate	Votes	%	±%
Conservative	James Douglas-Hamilton	17,646	38.2	−5.4
Liberal	Derek G. King	17,148	37.1	+17.6
Labour	Alec Wood	9,313	20.1	−9.2
SNP	John Nicoll	2,126	4.6	−2.9
Majority		498	1.1	−16.0
Turnout		46,233	75.7	−2.1
Conservative hold		Swing		

=== Elections in the 1970s ===
General election 1979: Edinburgh West
Party	Candidate	Votes	%	±%
Conservative	James Douglas-Hamilton	19,360	45.44	+7.29
Labour	Michael C.B. McGregor	12,009	28.19	+2.97
Liberal	R Callendar	7,330	17.21	+0.80
SNP	Colin Bell	3,904	9.16	−11.05
Majority		7,351	17.25	+4.32
Turnout		42,603	77.80	+1.24
Conservative hold		Swing		

General election October 1974: Edinburgh West
Party	Candidate	Votes	%	±%
Conservative	James Douglas-Hamilton	15,354	38.15	−6.06
Labour	WJ Taylor	10,152	25.22	+0.83
SNP	Catherina McMillan Moore	8,135	20.21	+10.29
Liberal	Donald Gorrie	6,606	16.41	−5.08
Majority		5,202	12.93	
Turnout		40,247	76.56	
Conservative hold		Swing		

General election February 1974: Edinburgh West
Party	Candidate	Votes	%	±%
Conservative	Anthony Stodart	18,908	44.21	−7.7
Labour	WJ Taylor	10,431	24.39	−8.8
Liberal	Donald Gorrie	9,189	21.49	+13.4
SNP	Catherina McMillan Moore	4,241	9.92	+3.1
Majority		8,477	19.82	
Turnout		42,769	82.18	
Conservative hold		Swing		

General election 1970: Edinburgh West
Party	Candidate	Votes	%	±%
Conservative	Anthony Stodart	26,864	49.23	+0.94
Labour	George Foulkes	19,523	35.78	−2.18
Liberal	Donald Gorrie	4,467	8.19	−4.56
SNP	Muriel Gibson	3,711	6.80	N/A
Majority		7,341	13.45	+4.12
Turnout		54,565	74.95	
Conservative hold		Swing		

=== Elections in the 1960s ===
General election 1966: Edinburgh West
Party	Candidate	Votes	%	±%
Conservative	Anthony Stodart	24,882	48.29	−2.27
Labour Co-op	Dick Douglas	20,073	38.96	+3.66
Liberal	James R Telfer	6,571	12.75	−1.39
Majority		4,809	9.33	
Turnout		51,526	78.66	
Conservative hold		Swing		

General election 1964: Edinburgh West
Party	Candidate	Votes	%	±%
Unionist	Anthony Stodart	26,298	50.56	−5.93
Labour	James K Stocks	18,359	35.30	+4.76
Liberal	James R Telfer	7,352	14.14	+1.17
Majority		7,939	15.26	
Turnout		52,009	80.91	
Unionist hold		Swing		

=== Elections in the 1950s ===
General election 1959: Edinburgh West
Party	Candidate	Votes	%	±%
Unionist	Anthony Stodart	25,976	56.49	−10.55
Labour	James K Stocks	14,044	30.54	−2.42
Liberal	Donald Leach	5,962	12.97	N/A
Majority		11,932	25.95	
Turnout		45,982	80.26	
Unionist hold		Swing		

General election 1955: Edinburgh West
Party	Candidate	Votes	%	±%
Unionist	Ian Clark Hutchison	26,000	67.04	+1.1
Labour	James Alexander Cuthburt Thomson	12,784	32.96	−1.0
Majority		13,216	34.0	+2.1
Turnout		38,784	75.7	−5.4
Unionist hold		Swing		

General election 1951: Edinburgh West
Party	Candidate	Votes	%	±%
Unionist	Ian Clark Hutchison	30,232	65.95	
Labour	Harry S Wilson	15,607	34.05	
Majority		14,625	31.90	
Turnout		45,839	83.12	
Unionist hold		Swing		

General election 1950: Edinburgh West
Party	Candidate	Votes	%	±%
Unionist	Ian Clark Hutchison	26,978	60.03	
Labour Co-op	C Morgan	14,377	31.99	
Liberal	Margaret Walker	3,586	7.98	
Majority		12,601	28.04	
Turnout		44,941	82.79	
Unionist hold		Swing		

=== Elections in the 1940s ===
General election 1945: Edinburgh West
Party	Candidate	Votes	%	±%
Unionist	Ian Clark Hutchison	19,894	47.38	−19.6
Labour	Gordon Stott	18,840	44.87	+11.9
Liberal	John Gibson Thomson	3,256	7.75	N/A
Majority		1,054	2.51	−31.5
Turnout		41,990	67.68	−1.4
Unionist hold		Swing		

1941 Edinburgh West by-election
Party	Candidate	Votes	%	±%
Unionist	Ian Clark Hutchison	Unopposed		
Unionist hold				

=== Elections in the 1930s ===
General election 1935: Edinburgh West
Party	Candidate	Votes	%	±%
Unionist	Thomas Cooper	28,023	67.01	
Labour	John Welch	13,794	32.99	
Majority		14,229	34.02	
Turnout		41,817	69.10	
Unionist hold		Swing		

1935 Edinburgh West by-election
Party	Candidate	Votes	%	±%
Unionist	Thomas Cooper	16,373	53.0	−18.2
Labour	William McAdam	10,462	33.9	+5.1
Liberal	George Paish	4,059	13.1	N/A
Majority		5,911	19.1	−23.3
Turnout		30,894	51.2	−28.0
Unionist hold		Swing		

General election 1931: Edinburgh West
Party	Candidate	Votes	%	±%
Unionist	Wilfrid Normand	31,407	71.20	+39.5
Labour	George Mathers	12,704	28.80	−10.2
Majority		18,703	42.40	N/A
Turnout		44,111	79.18	+4.4
Unionist gain from Labour		Swing		

=== Elections in the 1920s ===
General election 1929: Edinburgh West
Party	Candidate	Votes	%	±%
Labour	George Mathers	15,795	38.6	+5.5
Unionist	Wilfrid Normand	12,966	31.7	−4.9
Liberal	Vivian Phillipps	12,126	29.7	−0.6
Majority		2,829	6.9	N/A
Turnout		40,887	74.8	−4.5
Registered electors		54,695		
Labour gain from Unionist		Swing	+5.2	

General election 1924: Edinburgh West
Party	Candidate	Votes	%	±%
Unionist	Ian Macintyre	10,628	36.6	+3.6
Labour	George Mathers	9,603	33.1	+7.4
Liberal	Vivian Phillipps	8,790	30.3	−11.0
Majority		1,025	3.5	N/A
Turnout		29,021	79.3	+4.9
Registered electors		36,618		
Unionist gain from Liberal		Swing	−1.9	

Phillipps

General election 1923: Edinburgh West
Party	Candidate	Votes	%	±%
Liberal	Vivian Phillipps	11,010	41.3	−10.1
Unionist	Ian Macintyre	8,778	33.0	−15.6
Labour	George Mathers	6,836	25.7	N/A
Majority		2,232	8.3	+5.5
Turnout		26,624	74.4	+5.5
Registered electors		35,809		
Liberal hold		Swing	+2.8	

Vivian Phillipps

General election 1922: Edinburgh West
Party	Candidate	Votes	%	±%
Liberal	Vivian Phillipps	12,355	51.4	+16.9
Unionist	John Gordon Jameson	11,689	48.6	−2.2
Majority		666	2.8	N/A
Turnout		24,044	68.9	+15.6
Registered electors		34,899		
Liberal gain from Unionist		Swing	+9.6	

=== Elections in the 1910s ===
General election 1918: Edinburgh West
Party		Candidate	Votes	%	±%
C	Unionist	John Gordon Jameson	9,172	50.8	−3.0
	Liberal	Edward Parrott	6,220	34.5	−11.7
	Labour	John Alexander Young	2,642	14.7	N/A
Majority			2,952	16.3	+8.7
Turnout			18,034	53.3	−37.1
Registered electors			33,835		
	Unionist hold		Swing	+4.4	
C indicates candidate endorsed by the coalition government.

General election December 1910: Edinburgh West
Party	Candidate	Votes	%	±%
Liberal Unionist	James Avon Clyde	4,952	53.8	+1.3
Liberal	J.H. Morgan	4,252	46.2	−1.3
Majority		700	7.6	+2.6
Turnout		9,204	90.4	−1.0
Registered electors		10,179		
Liberal Unionist hold		Swing	+1.3	

General election January 1910: Edinburgh West
Party	Candidate	Votes	%	±%
Liberal Unionist	James Avon Clyde	4,683	52.5	+0.5
Liberal	Charles Henry Lyell	4,233	47.5	−0.5
Majority		450	5.0	+1.0
Turnout		8,916	91.4	+6.4
Registered electors		9,758		
Liberal Unionist hold		Swing	+0.5	

=== Elections in the 1900s ===
1909 Edinburgh West by-election
Party	Candidate	Votes	%	±%
Liberal Unionist	James Avon Clyde	Unopposed		
Liberal Unionist hold				

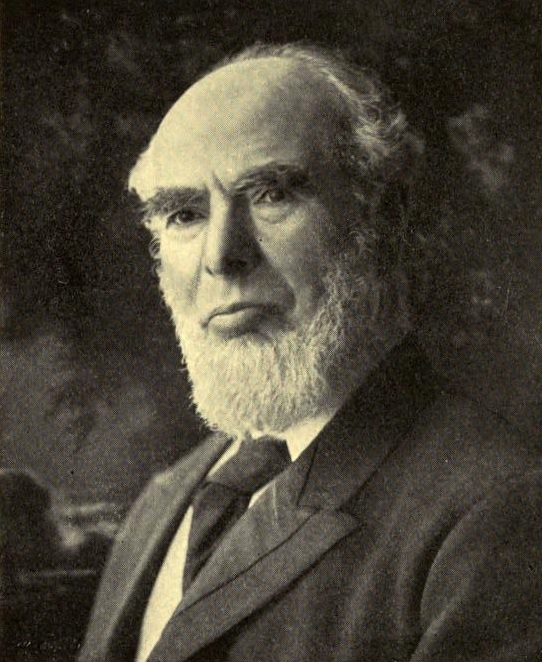
Courtney

General election 1906: Edinburgh West
Party	Candidate	Votes	%	±%
Liberal Unionist	Lewis McIver	3,949	52.0	−9.2
Liberal	Leonard Courtney	3,643	48.0	+9.2
Majority		306	4.0	−18.4
Turnout		7,592	85.0	+8.5
Registered electors		8,930		
Liberal Unionist hold		Swing	+9.2	

General election 1900: Edinburgh West
Party	Candidate	Votes	%	±%
Liberal Unionist	Lewis McIver	4,180	61.2	N/A
Liberal	E. Adam	2,645	38.8	N/A
Majority		1,535	22.4	N/A
Turnout		6,825	76.5	N/A
Registered electors		8,926		
Liberal Unionist hold		Swing	N/A	

=== Elections in the 1890s ===
General election 1895: Edinburgh West
Party	Candidate	Votes	%	±%
Liberal Unionist	Lewis McIver	Unopposed		
Liberal Unionist hold				

1895 Edinburgh West by-election
Party	Candidate	Votes	%	±%
Liberal Unionist	Lewis McIver	3,783	55.2	+1.5
Liberal	Alexander Murray	3,075	44.8	−1.5
Majority		708	10.4	+3.0
Turnout		6,858	81.1	−3.2
Registered electors		8,452		
Liberal Unionist hold		Swing	+1.5	

General election 1892: Edinburgh West
Party	Candidate	Votes	%	±%
Liberal Unionist	William Palmer	3,728	53.7	−2.6
Liberal	Thomas Buchanan	3,216	46.3	+2.6
Majority		512	7.4	−5.2
Turnout		6,944	84.3	+11.9
Registered electors		8,236		
Liberal Unionist hold		Swing	−2.6	

=== Elections in the 1880s ===
1888 Edinburgh West by-election
Party	Candidate	Votes	%	±%
Liberal	Thomas Buchanan	3,294	50.4	+6.7
Liberal Unionist	Thomas Raleigh	3,248	49.6	−6.7
Majority		46	0.8	N/A
Turnout		6,542	84.4	+12.0
Registered electors		7,749		
Liberal gain from Liberal Unionist		Swing	+6.7	

- Caused by Buchanan's resignation to seek re-election as a Liberal candidate.

General election 1886: Edinburgh West
Party	Candidate	Votes	%	±%
Liberal Unionist	Thomas Buchanan	3,083	56.3	+15.4
Liberal	Robert Wallace	2,393	43.7	−15.4
Majority		690	12.6	N/A
Turnout		5,476	72.4	−12.5
Registered electors		7,565		
Liberal Unionist gain from Liberal		Swing	+15.4	

General election 1885: Edinburgh West
Party	Candidate	Votes	%	±%
Liberal	Thomas Buchanan	3,800	59.1	
Conservative	George Auldjo Jamieson	2,625	40.9	
Majority		1,175	18.2	
Turnout		6,425	84.9	
Registered electors		7,565		
Liberal win (new seat)				

== See also ==
- Politics of Edinburgh
