= 1935 Edinburgh West by-election =

UK parliamentary by-election

The 1935 Edinburgh West by-election was held on 2 May 1935. The by-election was held due to the appointment as Lord Justice General of the incumbent Conservative MP, Wilfrid Normand. It was won by the Conservative candidate Thomas Cooper.

Edinburgh West by-election, 1935
Party	Candidate	Votes	%	±%
Unionist	Thomas Cooper	16,373	53.0	−18.2
Labour	William McAdam	10,462	33.9	+5.1
Liberal	George Paish	4,059	13.1	New
Majority		5,911	19.1	−23.3
Turnout		30,894	51.2	−28.0
Unionist hold		Swing		
