= Ian MacIntyre =

Scotland international rugby union player

Ian MacIntyre, WS
- Born: 27 November 1869 Greenock, Scotland
- Died: 29 June 1946 (aged 76) Edinburgh, Scotland
- School: Fettes College

Rugby union career
- Position: Forward
Youth career
- Fettes College
Amateur team(s)
Years	Team	Apps	(Points)
- Edinburgh University
–	Edinburgh Wanderers		
Provincial / State sides
Years	Team	Apps	(Points)
- Edinburgh District
International career
Years	Team	Apps	(Points)
1890–91	Scotland	6	(0)
Refereeing career
Years	Competition		Apps
1899	Scottish Unofficial Championship		

26th President of the Scottish Rugby Union
- In office 1899–1900
- Preceded by: John Boswell
- Succeeded by: Robert MacMillan

Ian MacIntyre, WS (27 November 1869 – 29 June 1946) was a Scotland international rugby union player. He became the 26th President of the Scottish Rugby Union. For a period he was also a Unionist Party MP for Edinburgh West. He was also a Writer to the Signet.

== Rugby union career ==
=== Amateur career ===
MacIntyre started his rugby union at his Fettes College school. When he started studying law at the university, he then played for Edinburgh University. After university, MacIntyre played for Edinburgh Wanderers.

=== Provincial career ===
He was capped by Edinburgh District in the 1899 inter-city match. He was playing for Edinburgh Wanderers when he was called up.

=== International career ===
MacIntyre was capped 6 times for Scotland between 1890 and 1891.

=== Referee career ===
He refereed in the Scottish Unofficial Championship.

=== Administrative career ===
MacIntyre became the 26th President of the Scottish Rugby Union. He served the 1899–1900 term in office.

== Law career ==
He was educated at the University of Edinburgh, where he obtained an M. A. and LLB. He was admitted as a Writer to the Signet in 1893.

Macintyre's legal practice was concerned with financial and commercial undertakings.

== Political career ==
He was a member of Edinburgh Town Council from 1918 to 1920.

He first contested the Edinburgh West seat in 1923, but was beaten by the Liberal incumbent Vivian Phillips by 2,232 votes. He gained the seat in 1924, pushing Phillipps into third place, and finishing just over one thousand votes ahead of the second-placed Labour candidate. He did not stand again in 1929, when Labour gained the seat.

== Family ==
MacIntyre married in 1896 Ida van der Gucht. Their children, including two sons and four daughters, were:

- Duncan MacIntyre (1902–1930)
- Marjorie Linklater (1909–1997), wife of Eric Linklater, was a fervent Scottish Nationalist and campaigned for Winnie Ewing, the arts and the environment. MacIntyre's grandson is the journalist Magnus Linklater.
- Alastair Macintyre (1913–1979)
- Alison Bonfield

In 1932, MacIntyre was arrested and charged by Kenyan officials, along with his daughter Mrs Bonfield, on a charge of trying to kidnap two of his grandchildren. The charges were dropped at the Supreme Court of Kenya.

Parliament of the United Kingdom
Preceded by Vivian Phillipps	Member of Parliament for Edinburgh West; 1924 – 1929	Succeeded by George Mathers
