= Cathy Peattie =

Scottish politician (born 1951)

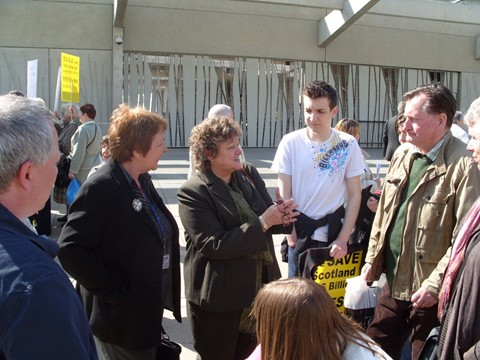
- Peattie (centre) and Cathie Craigie (second from left) in 2008

Member of the Scottish Parliament for Falkirk East
- In office 6 May 1999 – 22 March 2011
- Preceded by: Constituency established
- Succeeded by: Angus MacDonald

Personal details
- Born: Catherine Peattie; 24 November 1951 (age 74) Grangemouth, Falkirk, Scotland
- Party: Labour
- Spouse: Ian Peattie
- Relations: 5 grandchildren
- Children: Emma Peattie and Cara Hilton

Catherine "Cathy" Peattie (born 24 November 1951, Grangemouth, Falkirk) is a Scottish Labour Party politician.

She was the Member of the Scottish Parliament (MSP) for the Falkirk East constituency from the 1999 Scottish Parliament election until the 2011 Scottish Parliament election, when she was defeated by Angus MacDonald of the Scottish National Party (SNP).

Peattie served as chair of the Scottish Labour Party from 2019 to 2020, with her daughter Cara Hilton serving as vice-chair during her time in the office and succeeding her as chair.

Scottish Parliament
New parliament Scotland Act 1998	Member of the Scottish Parliament for Falkirk East; 1999–2011	Succeeded by Angus MacDonald
