= Michelle Thomson =

Scottish National Party politician

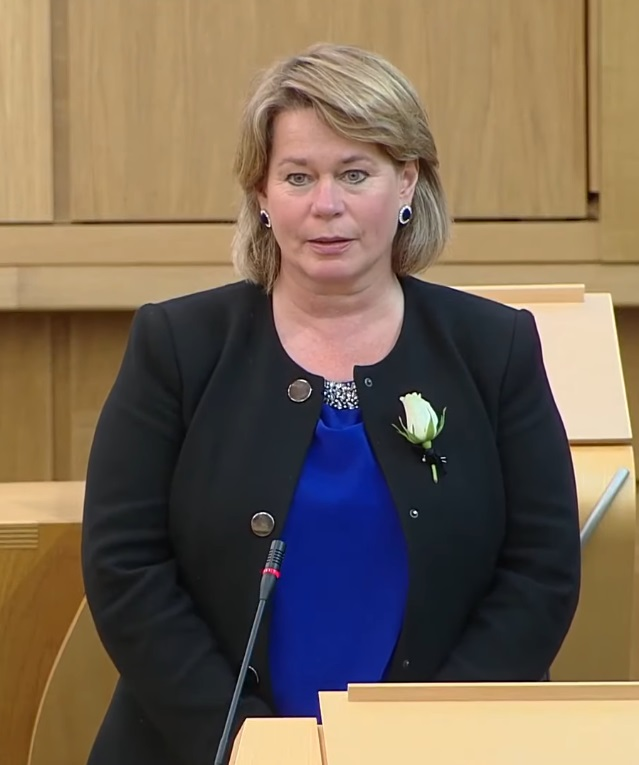
- Affirming in 2021

Member of the Scottish Parliament for Falkirk East
- In office 6 May 2021 – 9 April 2026
- Preceded by: Angus MacDonald
- Succeeded by: Constituency abolished

SNP Spokesperson for Business, Innovation and Skills
- In office 20 May 2015 – 30 September 2015
- Preceded by: Position established
- Succeeded by: Hannah Bardell

Member of Parliament for Edinburgh West
- In office 8 May 2015 – 3 May 2017
- Preceded by: Mike Crockart
- Succeeded by: Christine Jardine

Personal details
- Born: Michelle Rhonda Perks; 11 March 1965 (age 61) Bearsden, Scotland, UK
- Party: Scottish National Party (1981–2015, 2018–); Independent (2015–17)
- Education: Royal Scottish Academy of Music and Drama

Michelle Rhonda Thomson (née Perks; born 11 March 1965) is a Scottish businesswoman and Scottish National Party (SNP) politician. She served as the Member of the Scottish Parliament (MSP) for Falkirk East from 2021 to 2026.

Thomson is the co-founder of Momentous Change Ltd, a consultancy she set up with Professor Roger Mullin in 2017 to help organisations manage change. In 2018, Momentous Change published its first report, Brexit and Scottish Business.

Prior to this, Thomson was the Member of Parliament for Edinburgh West from May 2015 until May 2017. She served as the SNP Business, Innovation and Skills spokesperson in the House of Commons until her resignation of the party whip in September 2015. She was also a member of the Business, Energy and Industrial Strategy (BEIS) Committee from 2015 to 2017.

Since stepping down from the House of Commons in 2017, she has been appointed as Ambassador for the All Party Parliamentary Group for Fair Business Banking. She has also been appointed to the advisory panel to the Northern Ireland Assembly's All-Party Group on Fair Banking and Finance.

== Early life and career ==
Thomson graduated from the Royal Scottish Academy of Music and Drama in 1985.

Thomson initially worked as a professional musician and then completed a post graduate diploma in Information technology (IT). She worked in Financial Services for Standard Life and the Royal Bank of Scotland for over 23 years in a variety of senior roles delivering IT and business change. In 2009 she set up her own small business in property.

== Momentous Change Ltd ==
Thomson established Momentous Change Ltd in 2017 with co-founder Professor Roger Mullin. Momentous Change was a niche consultancy providing research and consultancy support to a variety of public and private sector organisations. The firm self-funded research involving 236 senior Scottish business leaders across industry to establish their concerns over Brexit. The final report was published in February 2018. Its principal findings and recommendations included the need for a new skills strategy and greater financial and practical support from government.

In November 2018, Thomson was a co-author of a Momentous Change Ltd report into the prospects for establishing a Scottish Stock Exchange and in 2020 she was co-author of a report into the Scottish Business Diaspora.

Momentous Change ceased trading when Thomson was selected as a candidate for the Scottish Parliament and was formally dissolved in 2021.

== Political career ==
=== Edinburgh West MP (2015–2017) ===
Thomson joined the Scottish National Party at the age of sixteen in 1981. She became prominent politically during the Scottish independence referendum campaign, with the "Yes" campaign. She was elected as the Member of Parliament for Edinburgh West in 2015 with a majority of 3,210 votes and a 39% share of the vote; with a swing of 25.8% from Liberal Democrat to SNP. The Sunday Post described her as one of the SNP MPs to watch in the new parliament. The National described Thomson as "a breath of fresh air" in light of her broad-based life experience.

As part of her role on the BEIS committee, Thomson was one of the members of the joint committee inquiries into the collapse of BHS, into the working practices of Sports Direct.

In September 2015, Thomson was accused by an article in The Sunday Times of having built her buy-to-let property portfolio by buying homes for below-market prices. In late-September 2015, Police Scotland announced it had launched an inquiry into "alleged irregularities" related to the property transactions which had seen her solicitor struck off. The same day the SNP issued a statement on behalf of Thomson, announcing that she had decided to withdraw herself from the party whip whilst the investigation was ongoing. In resigning the whip, Thomson also lost her SNP membership and her role as the SNP's Business, Innovation and Skills spokesperson at Westminster. Thomson subsequently claimed she had been forced to resign the whip. Eight months after the story broke, Thomson issued a press statement noting that there had been no contact with her from Police Scotland. In 2023 a Daily Record story claimed Thomson had been 'bullied out of SNP' by former First Minister Nicola Sturgeon.

In December 2016, in a House of Commons debate focused on UN International Day for the Elimination of Violence against Women, Thomson described the impact of having been raped at the age of fourteen years old, highlighting the conditions of silence and shame that prevent rape from being discussed or reported.

Thomson was sitting as an independent MP when the 2017 snap general election was called on 18 April 2017. The SNP's national executive met four days later and ruled that they would not endorse her as an SNP candidate. She did not stand as an independent at that election, issuing a statement that noted, "even in political parties the concept of natural justice must apply, as must the need for defined processes that are applied fairly, rigorously and transparently. I would advise the SNP to employ the services of an external body to help them develop a process as soon as possible."

In August 2017, the police investigation was dropped. Former Scottish Government Minister Kenny MacAskill said the SNP had lessons to learn over their handling of her case. Former First Minister Alex Salmond was also quoted as saying how badly Thomson had been treated by the media and the SNP.

=== Falkirk East MSP (2021–2026) ===
Thomson re-joined the SNP in October 2018. She was then selected as the SNP parliamentary candidate for the Falkirk East constituency in the Scottish parliamentary elections of May 2021, and she was elected to Holyrood with 47.4% of the vote. She endorsed Kate Forbes in the 2023 Scottish National Party leadership election, taking over running her campaign after Ivan McKee stepped back.

Thomson has been an outspoken critic of Scottish Government actions on gender policy, including voting against the Gender Recognition Reform (Scotland) Bill. She submitted a joint amendment to the Bill with Scottish Conservative MSP Russell Findlay which aimed to prevent those charged with sexual offences from changing gender while awaiting trial. In 2023, Thomson was named Political Hero of the Year by Holyrood Magazine and was named Backbencher of the Year in 2024.

During her time in Parliament, she has raised issues affecting the rights of women and girls both at home and abroad. This has included bringing forward a motion highlighting the plight of women and girls under Taliban control in Afghanistan and advocating for stronger protections against non-fatal strangulation and the so-called "rough sex murder defense" used by those accused of murdering a sexual partner.

Thomson sits on the Parliament's Finance and Public Administration Committee, with work including annual scrutiny of the Scottish Government's budget, as well as inquiries into the use of commissioners in Scotland's public service landscape and the cost effectiveness of public inquiries. Notably, in 2025 Thomson questioned the Scottish Government's permanent secretary on delays to the implementation of guidance from the Equalities and Human Rights Commission following the Supreme Court's ruling in the case For Women Scotland Ltd v The Scottish Ministers.

On 29 January 2025, Thomson announced she would stand down at the 2026 Scottish Parliament election.

== Personal life ==
Michelle Thomson's email address was released in a data hack on adultery website Ashley Madison in 2015.

== Publications ==
- "Scottish Business and International Trade – Perceptions of the Scottish Business Diaspora", Momentous Change Ltd, January 2020.
- "Why Banks Must Change" International Banker, 5 September 2018. Retrieved 7 September 2018. Why Banks Must Change
- "A Stock Exchange for Scotland: Early background research", Momentous Change Ltd, November 2018.
- "The Illusion Of Stability Gives Way To The Reality Of Change In Capital Markets – Introducing Scotland's New Stock Exchange" International Banker, 11 June 2019. Retrieved 30 July 2019. The Illusion of Stability Gives Way to the Reality of Change in Capital Markets: Introducing Scotland’s New Stock Exchange

Parliament of the United Kingdom
Preceded by Mike Crockart	Member of Parliament for Edinburgh West; 2015–2017	Succeeded by Christine Jardine
Scottish Parliament
Preceded by Angus MacDonald	MSP for Falkirk East; 2021 – 2026	Constituency abolished
