= Thomas Cooper, 1st Baron Cooper of Culross =

Scottish Unionist Party politician, judge and historian

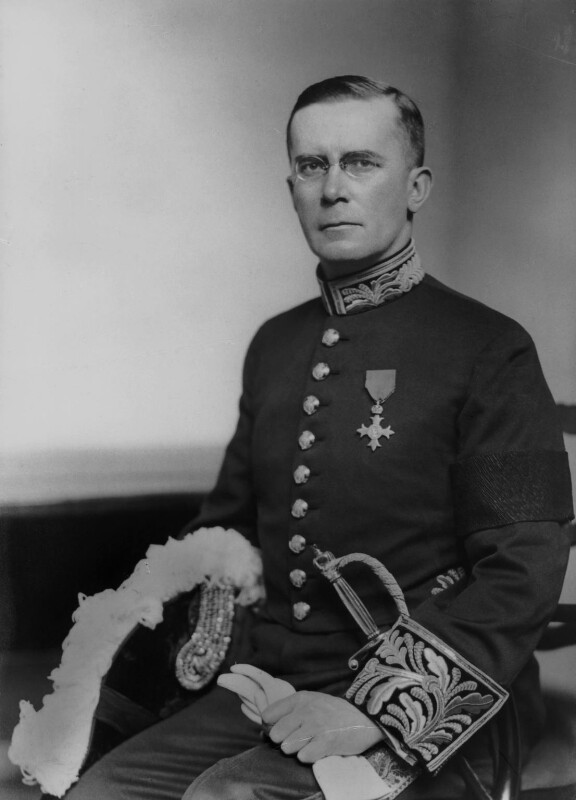
Cooper

Thomas Mackay Cooper, 1st Baron Cooper of Culross OBE, PC, FRSE (24 September 1892 – 15 July 1956) was a Scottish Unionist Party politician, judge and historian.

== Background and education ==
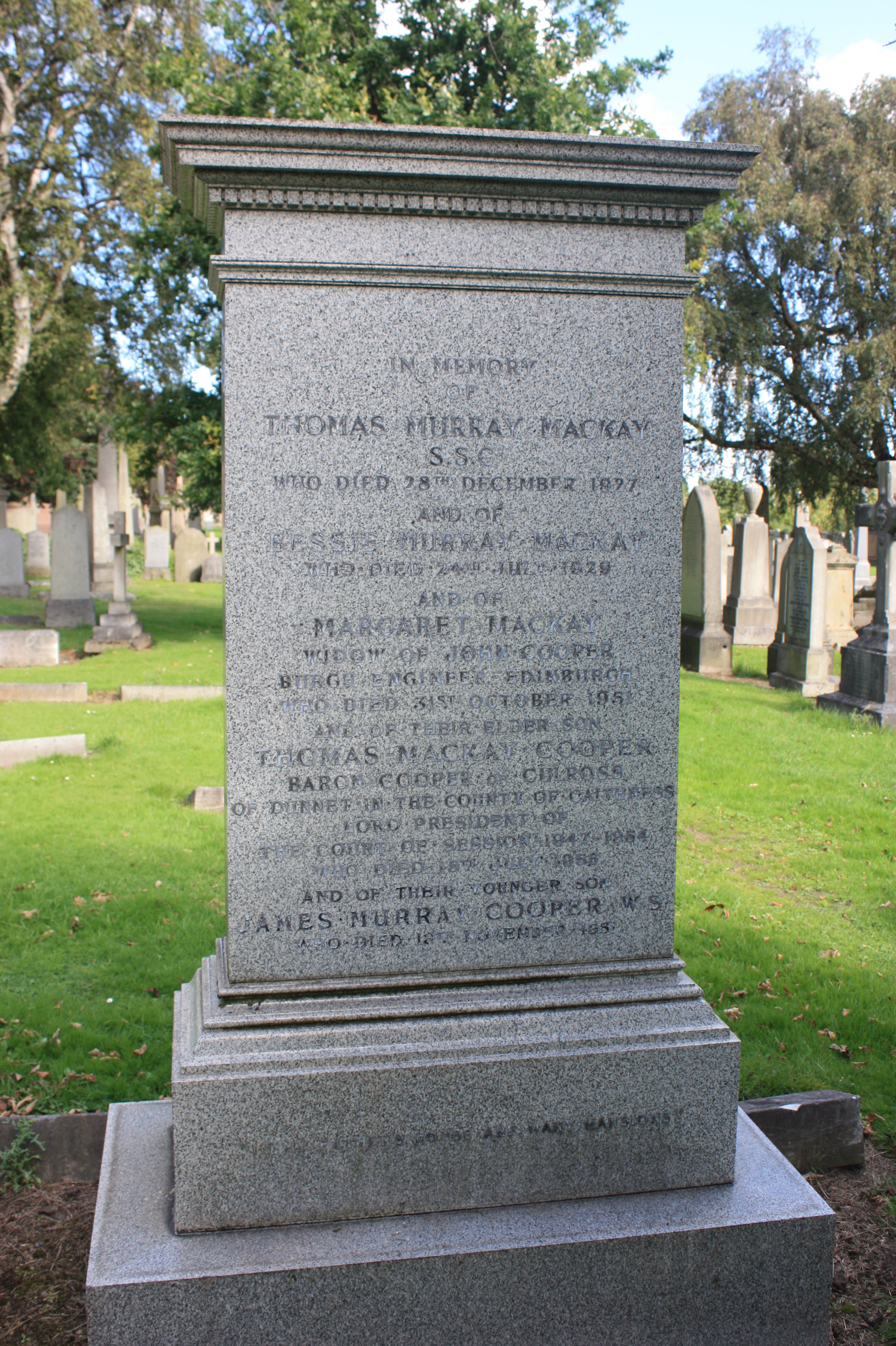
The grave of Thomas Cooper, Baron Cooper, Grange Cemetery, Edinburgh

Cooper was the son of John Cooper, of Edinburgh, a civil engineer, and Margaret, daughter of John Mackay, of Dunnet, Caithness. In 1902 he was admitted to George Watson's College, Edinburgh, and afterwards studied at the University of Edinburgh where he completed an MA in 1912 and a Bachelor of Laws (LLB).

== Political, legal and judicial career ==
Cooper was admitted a member of the Faculty of Advocates in 1915 and created a King's Counsel in 1927. He was the Unionist Member of Parliament (MP) for Edinburgh West from a by-election in 1935 to 1941. In 1935 he was appointed Solicitor General for Scotland and later that year he was appointed as Lord Advocate. He also became a Privy Counsellor in 1935. In 1941 he became Lord Justice Clerk with the judicial title of Lord Cooper and in 1947 Lord Justice General and Lord President of the Court of Session.

He resigned in 1954 and was made a peer as Baron Cooper of Culross, of Dunnet in the County of Caithness.

== Personal life ==
Cooper was married to Margaret Mackay.

He was elected a Fellow of the Royal Society of Edinburgh in 1936, his proposers being John Alexander Inglis, Thomas Henry Holland, Thomas Hudson Beare and Ernest Wedderburn. He served as the society's vice president from 1945 to 1948.

== Death ==
Lord Cooper of Culross died in July 1956, aged 62, at which point the barony became extinct. He is buried with his parents near the centre of the SW section of the original Grange Cemetery in south Edinburgh.

== See also ==
- MacCormick v Lord Advocate

Parliament of the United Kingdom
Preceded by Wilfrid Normand	Member of Parliament for Edinburgh West; 1935–1941	Succeeded by Sir Ian Clark Hutchison
Legal offices
Preceded by Douglas Jamieson	Solicitor General for Scotland; 1935	Succeeded by Albert Russell
Preceded by Douglas Jamieson	Lord Advocate; 1935–1941	Succeeded by James Reid
Preceded by Lord Aitchison	Lord Justice Clerk; 1941–1947	Succeeded by Lord Thomson
Preceded by Lord Normand	Lord Justice General; 1947–1954	Succeeded by Lord Clyde
Peerage of the United Kingdom
New creation	Baron Cooper of Culross; 1954–1956	Extinct
