= John Gordon Jameson =

British politician

Major John Gordon Jameson (1878–1955) was Unionist Party MP for Edinburgh West.

He was also an advocate, and his father was Andrew Jameson, Lord Ardwall.

He unsuccessfully contested the 1912 Edinburgh East by-election, where he had already been selected as the Unionist candidate before the MP died. (At that stage he was nominally a Liberal Unionist, although they merged with the Conservatives only three months later.)

He was elected in Edinburgh West as a supporter of David Lloyd George's coalition government in 1918, but he lost his seat to the Liberals in 1922.

In 1923, Jameson was appointed Sheriff-substitute of the sheriff of the Lothians and Peebles and became a member of the Council of the Cockburn Association, a position he retained until 1932.

Parliament of the United Kingdom
Preceded by James Avon Clyde	Member of Parliament for Edinburgh West; 1918 – 1922	Succeeded by Vivian Phillipps
