= Mike Crockart =

British politician

Michael Crockart
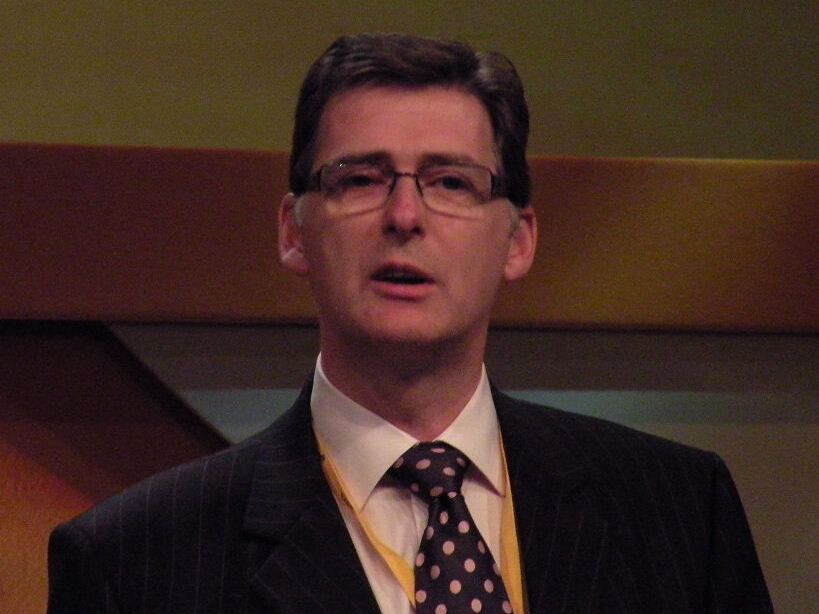
- Crockart in 2011

Member of Parliament for Edinburgh West
- In office 6 May 2010 – 30 March 2015
- Preceded by: John Barrett
- Succeeded by: Michelle Thomson

Personal details
- Born: 19 March 1966 (age 60)
- Party: Liberal Democrats
- Education: University of Edinburgh

Michael Bruce Crockart (born 19 March 1966) is a Scottish Liberal Democrat politician. He was the Member of Parliament (MP) for Edinburgh West from 2010 to 2015.

Crockart was the Parliamentary Private Secretary (PPS) to Michael Moore, Secretary of State for Scotland, but he quit in December 2010 to vote against the rise in tuition fees.

== Early career ==
Crockart was educated at Perth High School and the University of Edinburgh where he studied social sciences.

He worked as a policeman with Lothian and Borders Police for eight years before becoming a systems developer with Standard Life.

He first challenged for elected office in 2002 when he came second in a by-election for the Balerno ward of the City of Edinburgh Council, coming second to the Conservatives. He stood for the same ward again the following year, increasing his share of the vote.

=== Edinburgh North and Leith ===
In 2005 he stood for the Westminster constituency of Edinburgh North and Leith, coming second to Labour's Mark Lazarowicz and securing a swing of 8.3% from Labour to the Liberal Democrats. In November 2005 he again sought election to the city council, standing in another by-election in Murrayfield, and again came second. In the 2007 Scottish Parliament elections in the smaller Scottish constituency of Edinburgh North and Leith, and again secured a large swing from Labour but still finished in second place.

=== Edinburgh West ===
In 2009, Liberal Democrat MP for Edinburgh West John Barrett announced his retirement, prompting a nomination contest. Crockart stood against city council housing leader Paul Edie, former Borders MSP Euan Robson and former Edinburgh Central Scottish Parliament candidate Siobhan Mathers. Crockart defeated Edie by 77 votes to 57. He retained the seat for the Liberal Democrats in the 2010 general election with an 8.2% majority, despite suffering a large swing to the Labour Party of 11.4%.

== Member of Parliament ==
The 2010 general election produced a hung parliament, whereby no one party had a majority in the House of Commons and so a coalition agreement was drawn up between the Conservatives and the Liberal Democrats. As a result, upon his election Crockart sat on the Government benches in the House of Commons as opposed to the opposition ones. Speaking about the agreement, Crockart claimed that this was a "bold and ambitious agreement" that would bring "positive change to Edinburgh". Crockart was appointed the Parliamentary Private Secretary (PPS) to the Scottish Secretary Michael Moore.

On 9 December 2010, Crockart resigned as Michael Moore's PPS to vote against the government's proposed rise in tuition fees. In his resignation letter, he told party chief whip Alistair Carmichael that the rise in potential student debt will "seriously impact on people's choices". He went on to say, "this is especially true for those students from poorer backgrounds, many of whom have no role models in their schools or families to demonstrate to them the benefits which can accrue from a university education."

In February 2015, Crockart had sat on the select committee cross-examining Alan Bates and Paula Vennells. Satirical magazine Private Eye reported that "Crockart was asking questions that weren't exactly unhelpful to Fujitsu's case".

During the 2015 general election campaign, Crockart criticised the Scottish National Party for issuing campaign letters referring to him as the "retiring MP". At the election, he lost his seat to SNP candidate Michelle Thomson having received 18,168 votes (33.1%) to Thomson's 21,378 votes (39.0%).

Parliament of the United Kingdom
Preceded by John Barrett	Member of Parliament for Edinburgh West; 2010–2015	Succeeded by Michelle Thomson
