= James Harman (lord mayor) =

British property developer and Lord Mayor of London

Sir Clement James Harman (15 May 1894 – 15 September 1975) was a British property developer. He was Lord Mayor of London from 1963 to 1964.
