= Wilfrid Normand, Baron Normand =

Scottish Unionist Party politician and judge

Normand in 1947 by Walter Stoneman

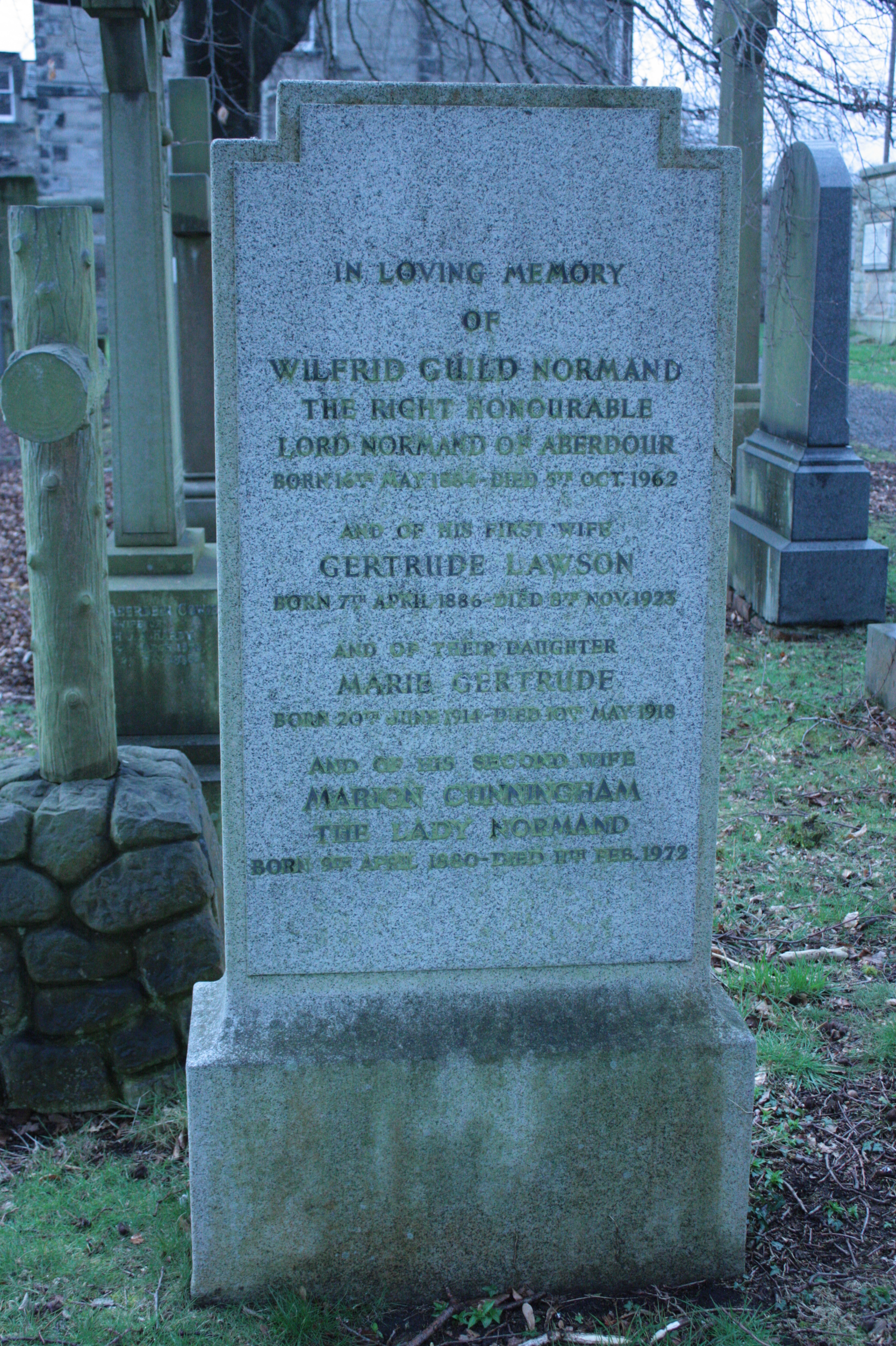
The grave of Sir Wilfrid Guild Normand, Dean Cemetery

Wilfrid Guild Normand, Baron Normand, PC (1884 – 5 October 1962), was a Scottish Unionist Party politician and judge. He was a Scottish law officer at various stages between 1929 and 1935, and a member of parliament (MP) from 1931 to 1935. He was Lord President of the Court of Session from 1935 until he became a Law Lord in 1947.

== Life ==
Normand was educated at Fettes College, Edinburgh, Oriel College, Oxford, Paris University and the University of Edinburgh. He was admitted as an advocate on 18 March 1910, the same day as the David King Murray, who also became Solicitor General and a Senator of the College of Justice.

He served in the Royal Engineers from 1915 to 1918. He became a King's Counsel in 1925.

He unsuccessfully contested Edinburgh West at the 1929 general election, but won the seat at the 1931 general election. until his resignation in 1935, causing a by-election which was won by Thomas Cooper. He served briefly as Solicitor General for Scotland in 1929 (from May to June) and from 1931 to 1933, when he was appointed Lord Advocate. He was appointed a Privy Counsellor in 1933.

In April 1935, Normand was appointed to the bench as Lord President and Lord Justice General, succeeding Lord Clyde and taking the judicial courtesy title Lord Normand. He was appointed a Lord of Appeal in Ordinary in 1947 and received as a Law lord a life peerage as Baron Normand, of Aberdour in the county of Fife, retiring in 1953. He was a Trustee of the National Library of Scotland from 1925 to 1946 and again from 1953, and a Trustee of the British Museum from 1950 to 1953.

He is buried with his two wives, Gertrude Lawson (1886–1923), and Marion Cunningham (1880–1972), in the north-west section of the first northern extension to Dean Cemetery in western Edinburgh. The grave lies in the first north extension to its western end.

Parliament of the United Kingdom
Preceded by George Mathers	Member of Parliament for Edinburgh West; 1931 – 1935	Succeeded by Thomas Cooper
Legal offices
Preceded by Alexander Munro MacRobert	Solicitor General for Scotland; 1929	Succeeded by John Watson
Preceded by John Watson	Solicitor General for Scotland; 1931–1933	Succeeded by Douglas Jamieson
Preceded by Craigie Mason Aitchison	Lord Advocate; 1933–1935	Succeeded by Douglas Jamieson
Preceded by Lord Clyde	Lord President of the Court of Session and Lord Justice General; 1935–1947	Succeeded by Lord Cooper of Culross
