= Hamish MacDonald (artist) =

Scottish artist

Hamish MacDonald DA PAI (January 1935- September 2008) was a Scottish impressionist and colourist artist from Glasgow, Scotland. His paintings feature mainly landscapes and coastal scenes, with some still-life works. His work features in several major collections, including those of the Kelvingrove Art Gallery, the Paisely Art Gallery and that of the Duke of Edinburgh.

== Biography ==
MacDonald lived in the Scottish Highlands until the age of eight, until he moved with his parents to the south side of Glasgow. He studied at the Glasgow School of Art from 1963 to 1967. MacDonald first exhibited his work at the Cosmo in Glasgow (now the Glasgow Film Theatre). He later taught art at several educational establishments in the Glasgow area, including Jordanhill College of Education, Mortherwell Technical College and Bell College of Technology. He began his role as Head of Art at St Patrick's High School in Coatbridge in 1974, remaining there until 1992.

MacDonald's paintings were influenced by the Impressionists and the Scottish Colourist movement, especially the works of William Gillies and Joan Eardley. He exhibited his paintings all around the UK, including exhibitions in the Royal Scottish Academy, the Royal West of England Academy and at London and Glasgow art fairs. In 1989 he won the £5000 Laing Art Competition prize.
