= Kerr's Miniature Railway =

Defunct miniature railway

Coordinates: 56.5512°N 2.6051°W

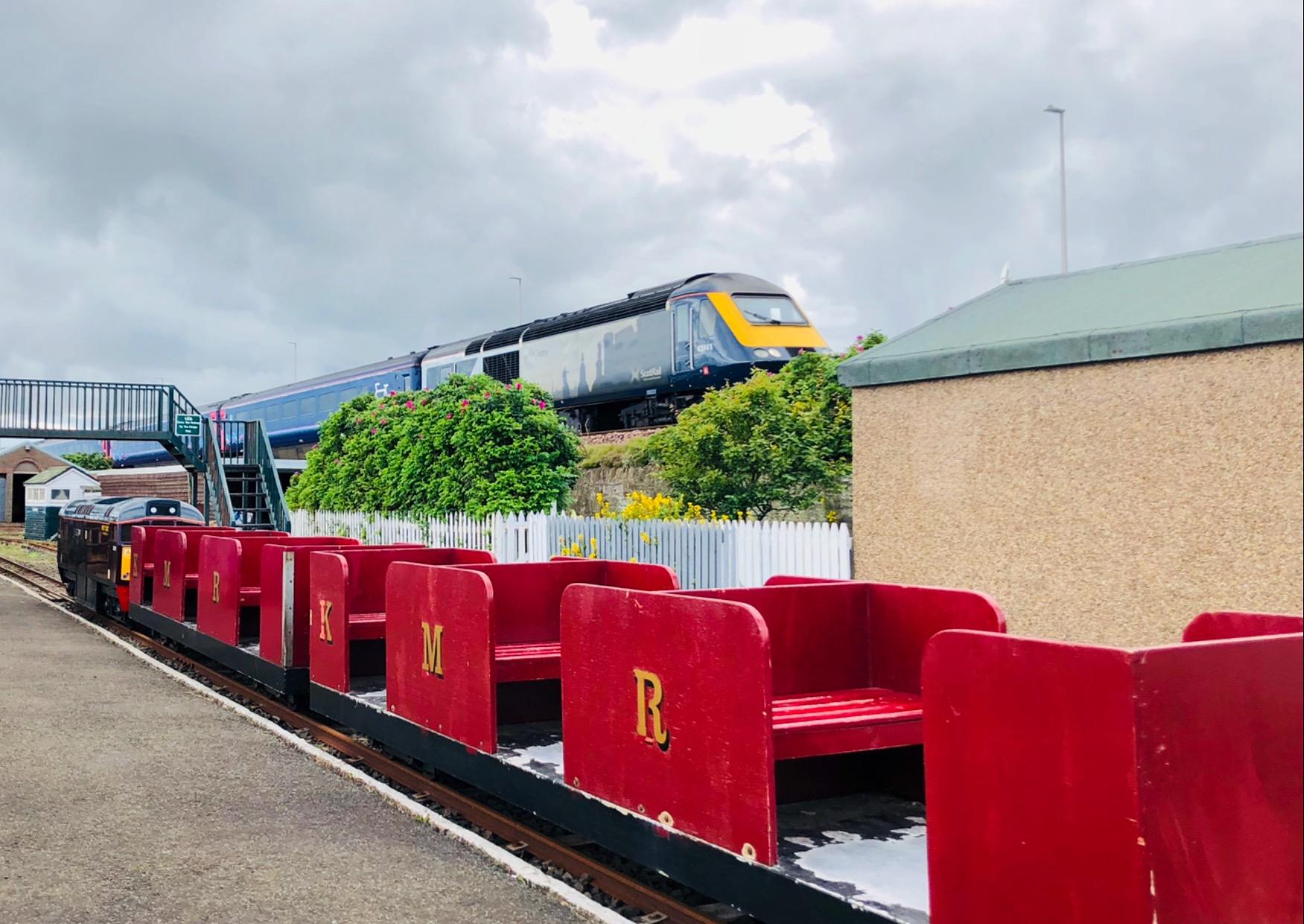
Kerr's Miniature Railway alongside the Dundee-Aberdeen line

Kerr's Miniature Railway was a 10 1/4 in (260 mm) gauge railway, a 1/2 mi (800 m) return ride, adjacent to the Dundee-Aberdeen line in West Links Park Arbroath. It was the oldest miniature railway in Scotland, having first opened for business in 1935. Under its original owner, Matthew Kerr (senior), it was a commercial business but since 1979, when it passed to his son, Matthew Kerr Jnr, it had been run as a non-profit concern.

With the death of Matthew Kerr Jnr, owner of Kerr's Miniature Railway, on 17 April 2006 after a prolonged illness, the future of the railway had been uncertain; however, Kerr's widow and son continued to run the railway with the help of volunteers.

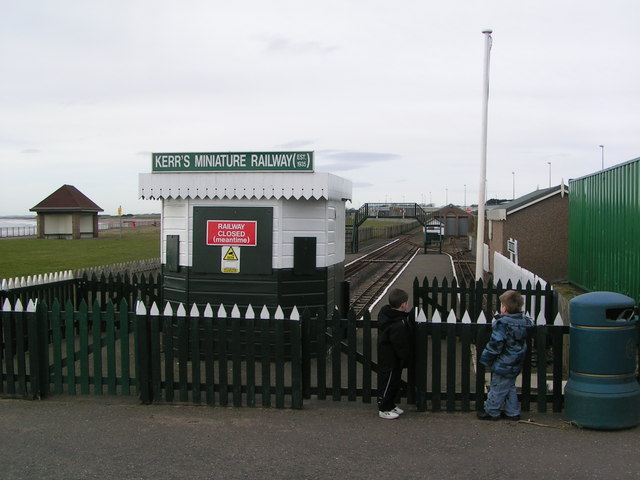
Station entrance

The railway had six locomotives, two of which were steam and built by Herbert Bullock in the 1930s. The railway also operated three miniature vehicles (two buses and a fire engine), which gave rides to children along the Arbroath seafront.

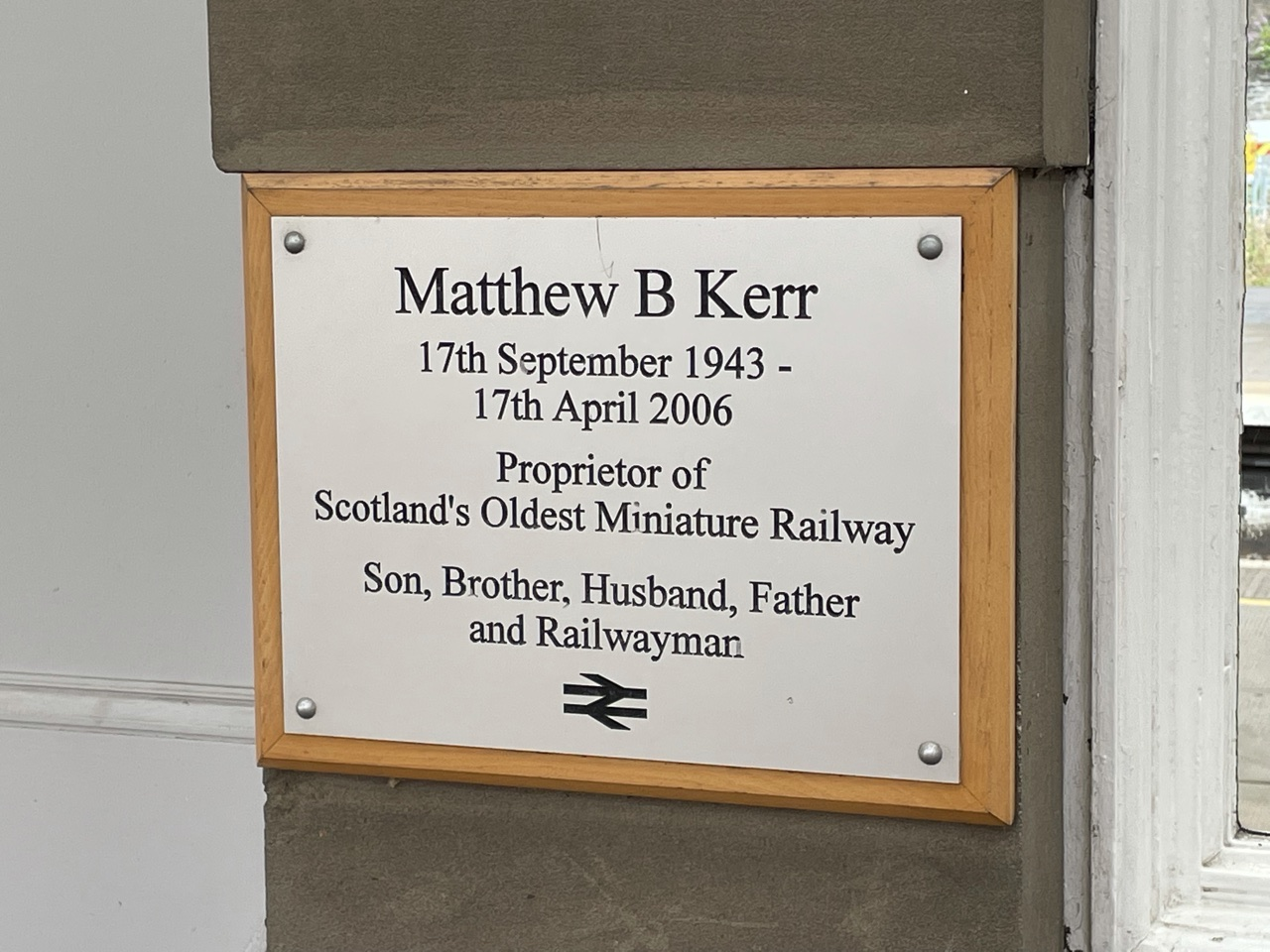
Tribute to Matthew Kerr at Arbroath Station.

Fares as of 2020 were £2.50 for both adults and children, with trains running weekends from April to end of September and both Easter and Summer local school holidays from 11am to 4pm.

In 2013, an extension to the entrance of West Links Park was planned.

It was announced in August 2020 that, due to falling passenger numbers, the railway would close in early October 2020. The railway closed indefinitely on 11 October 2020.

In April 2025, Angus Council was reported to be discussing a new 20-year lease on the site with the former operator, with a view to reopening the railway.
