= Donald Forbes =

Scottish murderer

Donald Forbes (1935 – 12 April 2008) was a Scottish convicted murderer. Forbes was convicted and jailed on three occasions, twice for murder and once for drug offences. He was at one time branded as "Scotland's most dangerous man".

Forbes was found guilty of murder in 1958 after a robbery at a fish factory in Edinburgh in which he killed night watchman Allan Fisher. Forbes was originally sentenced to the death penalty but it was reduced to life imprisonment. 12 years after the offence Forbes was freed.

Only weeks after being released Forbes committed murder again, this time in a pub during a brawl. He was jailed again; one year after the second imprisonment he escaped from the maximum security wing but was later recaptured.

In 1980, he married Alison Grierson. He went on to serve 10 years in the Barlinnie special unit with notorious killers such as Jimmy Boyle.

In 1998, he was released. In 2003 he was branded "Scotland's oldest drugs baron". At the age of 68 Forbes was arrested for preparing large quantities of cocaine and cannabis for sale. Forbes was caught after an anonymous tip off.

Forbes died in hospital on 12 April 2008 with his son James Forbes at his side, while still serving his prison sentence.
