= 1941 Edinburgh West by-election =

UK parliamentary by-election

The 1941 Edinburgh West by-election was a by-election in the Edinburgh West constituency that occurred on 12 July 1941.

Ian Clark Hutchison stood for the Unionist Party. As he faced no opposition, he was declared elected. It remains the last uncontested by-election in Scotland to date.
