= Hugh C. Rae =

Scottish author (1935–2014)

Hugh Crauford Rae
- Born: 22 November 1935; Knightswood, Glasgow, Scotland
- Died: 24 September 2014 (aged 78)
- Education: University of Glasgow (adult education lecturer)
- Occupations: Novelist, lecturer
- Writing career
- Pen name: Jessica Stirling, Robert Crawford, James Albany, Stuart Stern, R. B. Houston
- Language: English
- Genres: Thriller, romantic historical fiction
- Notable works: The Marksman, The Wind from the Hills

Hugh Crauford Rae (22 November 1935 – 24 September 2014) was a Scottish author of romantic historical fiction novels and thrillers. He wrote fiction using several pseudonyms, including Jessica Stirling, Robert Crawford, James Albany, Stuart Stern and R. B. Houston.

== Life ==
Rae was born in Knightswood, outside of Glasgow, in 1935. He is the son of a riveter. He lectured in creative writing at Glasgow University adult education classes.

== Writing ==
Rae was known for writing fiction, such as the thriller The Marksman later televised by the BBC. He was better known for his romantic historical novels written under the name Jessica Stirling.

=== Jessica Stirling novels ===
After Rae had written a few crime thrillers, a publisher suggested he collaborate with a romantic short story writer, Peggy Coghlan, to produce a historic romantic novel set in the Victorian period. The publisher required this to be published under a female name, and the writers picked the name Jessica Stirling at a meeting in a Stirling coffee shop.

Rae and Coghlan wrote seven Jessica Stirling novels together. Then, Rae went on to write another 30 such saga novels on his own, at a rate of two a year, published by Hodder & Stoughton.

Rae's real identity first became widely known in 1999, after 25 years of writing Jessica Stirling novels, when The Wind from the Hills was shortlisted for the Romantic Novelists' Association Romantic Novel of the Year prize.

== Works ==
- Skinner, 1966
- Night Pillow, 1967
- A Few Small Bones, 1968
- The Interview, 1969
- The Marksman, 1971
- The Shooting Gallery, 1972
- The Rock Harvest, 1973
- The Rookery, 1974
- Harkfast, 1976
- Sullivan, 1978
- The Travelling Soul, 1978
- The Haunting of Waverley Falls, 1980
- Privileged Strangers, 1982

as James Albany

- Warrior Caste, 1982
- Mailed Fist, 1982
- Deacon's Dagger, 1982

as Robert Crawford

- The Shroud Society, 1969
- Cockleburr, 1969
- Kiss the Boss Goodbye, 1970
- The Badger's Daughter, 1971
- Whiphand, 1972

as R. B. Houston

- Two for the Grave, 1972

as Stuart Stern

- The Minotaur Factor, 1977
- The Poison Tree, 1978

as Jessica Stirling with Peggie Coghlan

- The Spoiled Earth, 1974
- The Dresden Finch, 1976
- The Hiring Fair, 1976
- The Dark Pasture, 1977
- The Deep Well at Noon, 1979
- The Blue Evening Gone, 1981
