= Erskine-Hill baronets =

Baronetcy in the Baronetage of the United Kingdom

The Erskine-Hill Baronetcy, of Quothquhan in the County of Lanark, is a title in the Baronetage of the United Kingdom. It was created on 22 June 1945 for Alexander Erskine-Hill, Unionist Member of Parliament for Edinburgh North from 1935 to 1945.

== Erskine-Hill baronets, of Quothquhan (1945) ==
- Sir Alexander Galloway Erskine-Hill, 1st Baronet (1894–1947)
- Sir Robert Erskine-Hill, 2nd Baronet (1917–1989)
- Sir (Alexander) Roger Erskine-Hill, 3rd Baronet (born 1949)

The heir apparent is the present holder's son Robert Benjamin Erskine-Hill (born 1986).
