= James Milliken =

James Milliken may refer to:

- James B. Milliken (academic administrator) (born 1957), American academic administrator
- James B. Milliken (judge) (1900–1988), American jurist and politician
- James T. Milliken (1882–1952), American politician and businessman
- James W. Milliken (1848–1908), American businessman and politician

== See also ==
- James Millican (1911–1955), American actor
- James Millikin (1827–1909), founder of Millikin University
- James Millikin Bevans (1899–1977), major general in the United States Air Force
- James Milligan (disambiguation)
- Jamie Milligan (born 1980), English footballer
