= Charles Hampton Johnston =

Scottish Sheriff and Liberal Party politician

Charles Hampton Johnston QC, MA, LLB (10 April 1919 – 19 January 1981), was a Scottish Sheriff and a Liberal Party politician.

== Background ==
Johnston was the son of John Johnston and Johanna Hampton of Edinburgh. He was educated at Royal High School, Edinburgh and the University of Edinburgh. In 1950 he married Isobel Ross Young. They had one son and one daughter.

== Professional career ==
In 1940 while at University of Edinburgh, Johnston was editor of The Student. He received a Master of Arts in 1940 before joining the 52nd Lowland Division. Later he joined the 51st Highland Division, was wounded and reached the rank of lieutenant and in 1946 left the army with the rank of captain. In 1947 he became an advocate. In 1956 he became Standing Junior Counsel, for the Ministry of Works. In 1959 he became a Scottish Queen's Counsel. In 1962 he became Sheriff of Glasgow and Strathkelvin at Glasgow. In 1977 he became Sheriff Principal of South Strathclyde, Dumfries and Galloway.

== Political career ==
Johnston was Liberal candidate for the Edinburgh North division at the 1945 General Election.

General Election 1945: Edinburgh North
Party	Candidate	Votes	%	±%
Labour	George Willis	12,825	45.1	
Unionist	Alexander Erskine-Hill	12,270	43.1	
Liberal	Charles Johnston	3,344	11.8	
Majority		555	2.0	
Turnout			64.8	
Labour gain from Unionist		Swing		

He served as Chairman of the Edinburgh Liberal Council. He was elected a member of the Executive of the Scottish Liberal Party. He was Liberal candidate for the Stirlingshire East and Clackmannan division at the 1950 General Election.

General Election 1950: Stirlingshire East and Clackmannan
Party	Candidate	Votes	%	±%
Labour	Arthur Woodburn	22,980	56.5	
Unionist	SD Loch	13,630	33.5	
Liberal	Charles Johnston	4,078	10.0	
Majority		9,350	23.0	
Turnout			83.4	
Labour hold		Swing		

He did not stand for parliament again. Instead he devoted his political activity to the internal dealings of the Liberal Party; He was Chairman of the Executive of the Scottish Liberal Party from 1955 to 1956.
