= James Milligan =

James Milligan may refer to:

- James Milligan, Lord Milligan (1934–2005), Scottish lawyer and judge
- James Milligan (politician) (born 1978), Australian politician
- James Milligan (singer) (1928–1961), Canadian opera and concert singer
- James Milligan, a character from the 1932 play Dirty Work by Ben Travers

== See also ==
- Jamie Milligan (born 1980), English footballer
- James Milliken (disambiguation)
