= Ford baronets =

Baronetcy in the Baronetage of the United Kingdom

- Escutcheon of the Ford baronets of Westerdunes
- Creation date: 1929
- Status: extant
- Motto: Fortuna fortior fortitudo, Fortitude is stronger than fortune

The Ford Baronetcy, of Westerdunes in the County of East Lothian, is a title in the Baronetage of the United Kingdom. It was created on 27 July 1929 for the Unionist politician Patrick Ford. He represented Edinburgh North in the House of Commons from 1920 to 1923 and 1924 to 1935. As of 2021, the title is held by his grandson, the third Baronet, who succeeded his father in 1989.

== Ford baronets, of Westerdunes (1929) ==
- Sir Patrick Johnstone Ford, 1st Baronet (1880–1945)
- Sir Henry Russell Ford, 2nd Baronet (1911–1989)
- Sir Andrew Russell Ford, 3rd Baronet (born 1943)

The heir apparent is Toby Russell Ford (born 1973), eldest son of the 3rd Baronet.

== See also ==
- St Clair-Ford baronets, of Ember Court
