= SS Parisian =

UK transatlantic liner

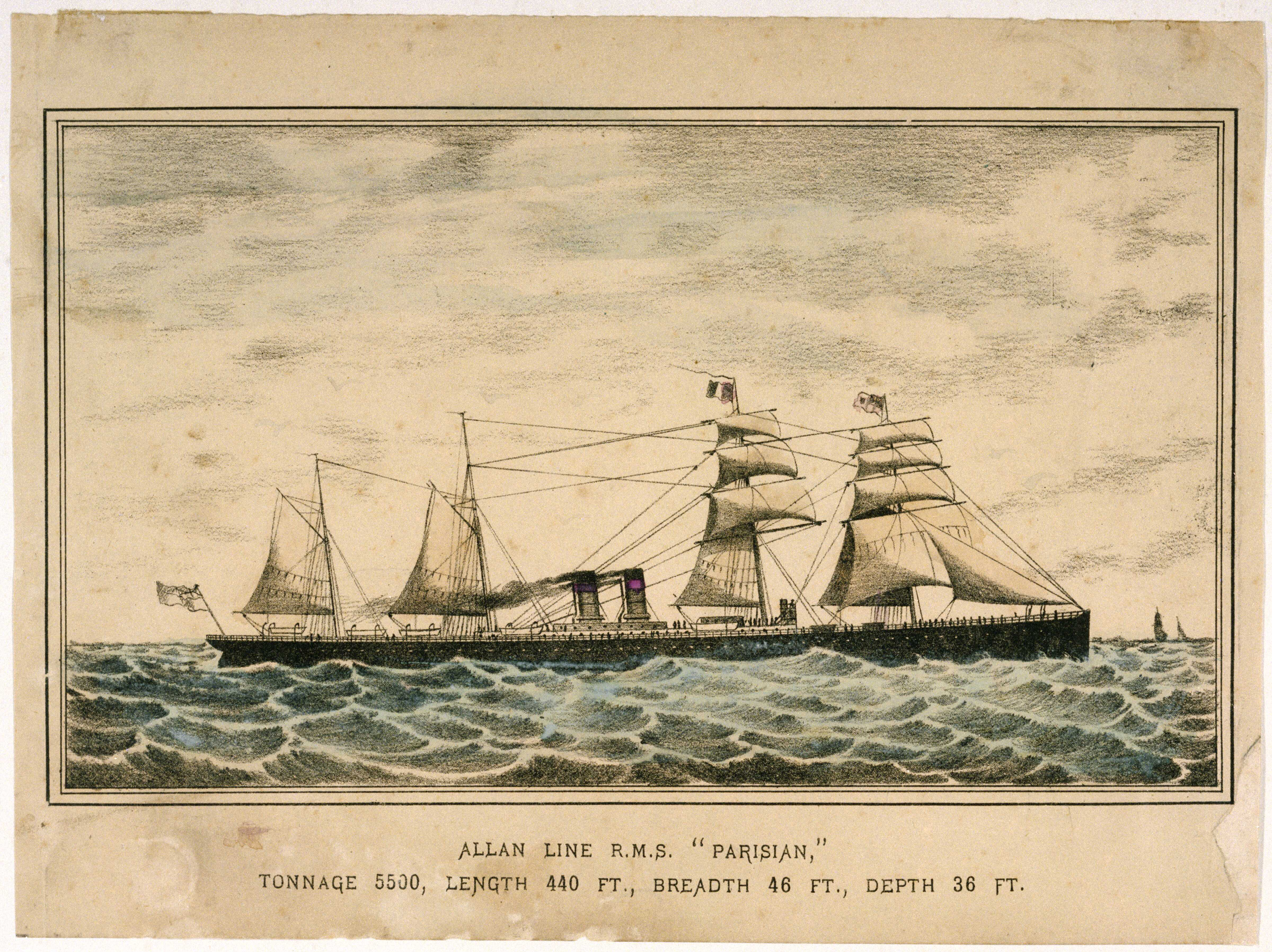
- Print of Parisian as built, with two funnels, and her foremast and mainmast square-rigged

History

United Kingdom
- Name: Parisian
- Owner: 1881: Nathaniel Dunlop; 1882: J&A Allan; 1898: Allan Line
- Operator: 1881: J&A Allan
- Port of registry: Glasgow
- Route: Liverpool – North America
- Builder: Robert Napier and Sons, Govan
- Yard number: 375
- Launched: 4 November 1880
- Completed: 1881
- Maiden voyage: 10 March 1881
- Refit: 1899
- Identification: UK official number 84294; code letters VJSD; by 1913: call sign MZN
- Fate: Scrapped in Italy, 1914

General characteristics
- Type: transatlantic ocean liner
- Tonnage: 1881: 5,154 GRT, 3,440 NRT; 1899: 5,395 GRT, 3,385 NRT
- Length: 440.8 ft (134.4 m)
- Beam: 46.2 ft (14.1 m)
- Depth: 1881: 33.2 ft (10.1 m); by 1896: 25.2 ft (7.7 m)
- Installed power: 1881: 1 x compound engine; 933 NHP; 1899: triple-expansion engine; 774 NHP
- Propulsion: 1 × screw
- Sail plan: 1881: four masts; foremast & mainmast square-rigged; 1899: four-masted schooner
- Speed: 14 knots (26 km/h)
- Capacity: Passengers: 150 × 1st class; 100 × 2nd class; 1,000 × 3rd class
- Crew: 1905: 150
- Notes: The first ship to have bilge keels. When new, the largest steel-hulled ship yet built.

SS Parisian was a transatlantic ocean liner that was launched in Scotland in 1880, and operated by the Allan Line. She was the first ship to be equipped with bilge keels. When new, she was the largest steel-hulled ship yet built. She was Allan Line's largest ship until Castillian and Bavarian were completed in 1899.

Parisian was modernised with a new engine and masts in 1899, and from 1902 she was equipped with wireless telegraphy. A collision in Halifax, Nova Scotia in 1905 sank her, but in shallow water in port, and she was raised and repaired. Parisian was sold for scrap in January 1914, and broken up in Italy.

== Building and registration ==
Robert Napier and Sons of Govan built Parisian as yard number 375. She was launched on 4 November 1880, and completed early in 1881. Her registered length was 440.8 ft (134.4 m), her beam was 46.2 ft (14.1 m), and her depth was 33.2 ft (10.1 m). She had berths for 1,250 passengers: 150 in first class; 100 in second class; and 1,000 in third class. Her tonnages were 5,154 GRT and 3,440 NRT. She had a single screw, driven by a three-cylinder compound engine that was rated at 933 NHP, and gave her a speed of 14 knots (26 km/h). As built, Parisian had twin funnels.

Parisian was registered in Glasgow. Her United Kingdom official number was 84294, and her code letters were VJSD. On 10 March 1881, Parisian left Liverpool on her maiden voyage, which was to Boston via Halifax.

Her original owner was Nathaniel Dunlop, with J&A Allan as her managers. However, by 1882, Lloyd's Register listed J&A Allan as her owners.

== Refit and wireless ==
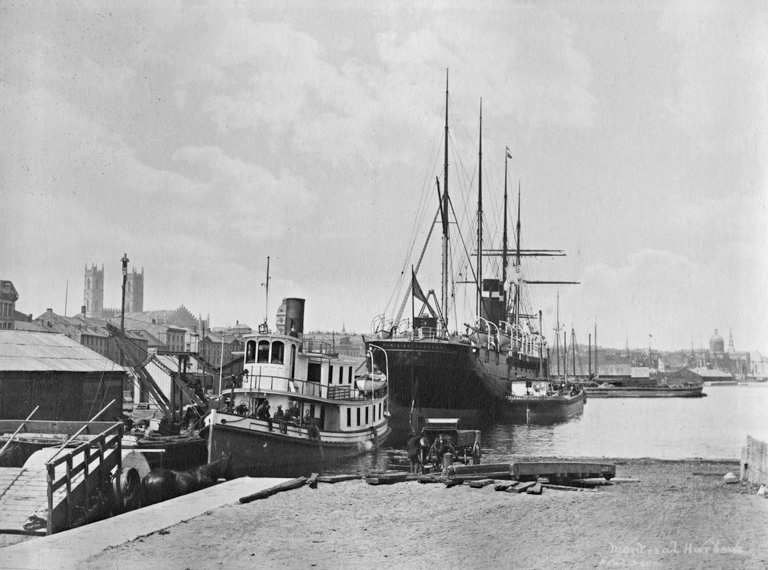
The Port of Montreal in about 1885. In the foreground, centre left, is a tugboat. Aft of her, with twin funnels, and spars on her foremast and mainmast, in Parisian.

Parisian was refitted in 1899. Her obsolete compound engine was replaced with a three-cylinder triple-expansion engine that was built by Workman, Clark and Company of Belfast and rated at 774 NHP. One of her funnels was removed, and her masts were replaced with plain ones without spars, making her a four-masted schooner.

In 1902, the Marconi Company installed wireless telegraphy aboard Parisian. By 1913, her call sign was MZN.

Passengers on deck of the SS Parisian, 1905

== Albano ==
On 16 March 1905, Parisian left Liverpool for Canada. The next day she called at Moville in County Donegal, Ireland. She was carrying 748 passengers, 150 crew, 400 sacks of mail, and about 1,100 tons of cargo. Many of her passengers were emigrants, bound for the Northwest Territories. On the evening of 25 March, off Chebucto Head, Nova Scotia, she slowed to 1 to 2 knots (2 to 4 km/h) to await a pilot to take her into Halifax. The Hamburg America Line (HAPAG) steamship Albano, carrying 149 passengers, and bound for Philadelphia, was nearby and also awaiting a pilot. At about 17:00 hrs, Albano's bow struck Parisian's starboard quarter, about 30 feet (9 m) from her stern, just aft of her number 5 cargo hatch, making a hole about 4 feet (1.2 m) wide and 15 feet (4.6 m) deep.

Parisian's Master, Captain J.M. Johnston, ordered her lifeboats to be swung out ready for launching, and ordered passengers to g to their lifeboat stations and don lifejackets. However, he also ordered the engine room to make full speed, for Parisian to try to cover the 15 nautical miles (28 km) to her berth in port as swiftly as possible. Several tugs came alongside to assist Parisian. In about 40 minutes she reached her berth, listing badly, and her sinking stern settled on the harbour bottom as she reached her berth. All of her passengers and most of her mail were disembarked unharmed, but much of her cargo was damaged by water. Albano's bow was twisted and leaking, and she also hurried into port, but her pumps kept pace with the water entering her forepeak. Albano's Master, Captain Kudenhold, alleged that Parisian cut across his bow. HAPAG submitted a claim for $150,000 against J&A Allan in an Admiralty court. However, the Exchequer Court of Canada found Albano to be fully at fault.

== Connection with Titanic ==
On 14 April 1912, Parisian was making a westbound crossing from Glasgow to Montreal. The transmission range of shipborne wireless telegraphy at that time was relatively short. Parisian's was only 270 kilometres (150 nmi), which was typical for many ships of her era. Wireless-equipped ships compensated for this by relaying signals from ship to ship. At one time during the day on 14 April, the Atlantic Transport Line ship Mesaba was about 50 nautical miles (93 km) ahead of Parisian, which in turn was a similar distance ahead of the Leyland Liner Californian. RMS Titanic was about 125 nautical miles (232 km) astern of Parisian. At about 12:00 noon, Mesaba transmitted an ice warning to Parisian, whose Marconi wireless officer, Donald Sutherland, relayed it to the Cunard Liner RMS Carpathia. At another time on the same day, Mesaba was astern of Parisian and ahead of Titanic. Early that evening, Parisian sighted "huge icebergs", and transmitted a warning to Mesaba. Sutherland said his last contact with Titanic was about 22:30 hrs (ship's time).

On the same day, Sutherland had been busy trying to summon aid for a German oil tanker, the 3,710 GRT Deutschland, which was reported to be drifting and disabled. At 22:00 hrs that evening, Parisian's Master, Captain Hains, ordered Sutherland to bed. At that time, most wireless-equipped ships carried only one wireless officer. They worked during the day, and their transceivers were unmanned overnight. By 1912, about 450 ships in the UK merchant fleet had wireless, but only about 50 of them carried enough wireless officers to keep watch at all hours of the day and night. Titanic struck the iceberg around 23:40 hrs (New York time), and started transmitting distress signals after midnight. By then, Sutherland aboard Parisian was in bed.

Sutherland resumed duty early on the morning of 15 April, and heard Carpathia signal that Titanic had sunk. Captain Hains realised that Parisian was too far from Titanic's reported position to be of any help, and that other ships, including Californian and Carpathian were nearer, so he kept Parisian on course for Halifax. On 16 April, when Parisian was within range, Sutherland signalled to the Marconi station on Sable Island: "I have no survivors of the Titanic on board and no official information as to the fate of the ship. Expect to reach Halifax early to-morrow morning." She reached Halifax on 17 April.

== Bibliography ==
- Haws, Duncan (1979). The Ships of the Union, Castle, Union-Castle, Allan and Canadian Pacific lines. Merchant Fleets in Profile. Vol. 3. Cambridge: Patrick Stephens Ltd. ISBN 0-85059-352-2.
- Lloyd's Register of British and Foreign Shipping. London: Lloyd's Register of Shipping. 1881 – via Internet Archive.
- Lloyd's Register of British and Foreign Shipping. London: Lloyd's Register of Shipping. 1882 – via Internet Archive.
- Lloyd's Register of British and Foreign Shipping. Vol. I.–Steamers. London: Lloyd's Register of Shipping. 1896 – via Internet Archive.
- Lloyd's Register of British and Foreign Shipping. Vol. I.–Steamers. London: Lloyd's Register of Shipping. 1897 – via Internet Archive.
- Lloyd's Register of British and Foreign Shipping. Vol. I.–Steamers. London: Lloyd's Register of Shipping. 1899 – via Internet Archive.
- The Marconi Press Agency Ltd (1913). The Year Book of Wireless Telegraphy and Telephony. London: The St Katherine Press.
- Mercantile Navy List. London: Registrar General of Shipping and Seamen. 1882 – via Crew List Index Project.
- Reports of Cases Relating to Maritime Law: New series. Vol. X. London: Field Press. 1908 – via Google Books.
