= Joe Tinker (politician) =

British politician (1875–1957)

John Joseph Tinker (15 January 1875 – 30 July 1957) was a British Labour Party politician.

Born in Little Hulton, Tinker began working at a coal mine at the age of ten. He became active in the Lancashire and Cheshire Miners' Federation, and became the union's full-time agent for the St Helens area in 1915.

Tinker was a supporter of the Labour Party, for which he was elected to St Helens Town Council in 1919. He was elected at the 1923 general election as Member of Parliament (MP) for Leigh in Lancashire with the support of the Miners' Federation of Great Britain, and held the seat until his retirement from the House of Commons at the 1945 general election.

During his 22 years in the House of Commons, Joseph Tinker ensured that the safety of coal miners and their welfare became a key issue discussed, debated and acted upon. Against considerable opposition, he ensured that the dreadful working conditions of miners were improved.

Joseph Tinker also introduced the first legislation which brought equal funding to Catholic schools in the UK.

Parliament of the United Kingdom
Preceded by Henry Twist	Member of Parliament for Leigh; 1923–1945	Succeeded by Harold Boardman
