= James Avon Clyde, Lord Clyde =

British politician and judge

The Right Honourable The Lord Clyde DL, KC, PC
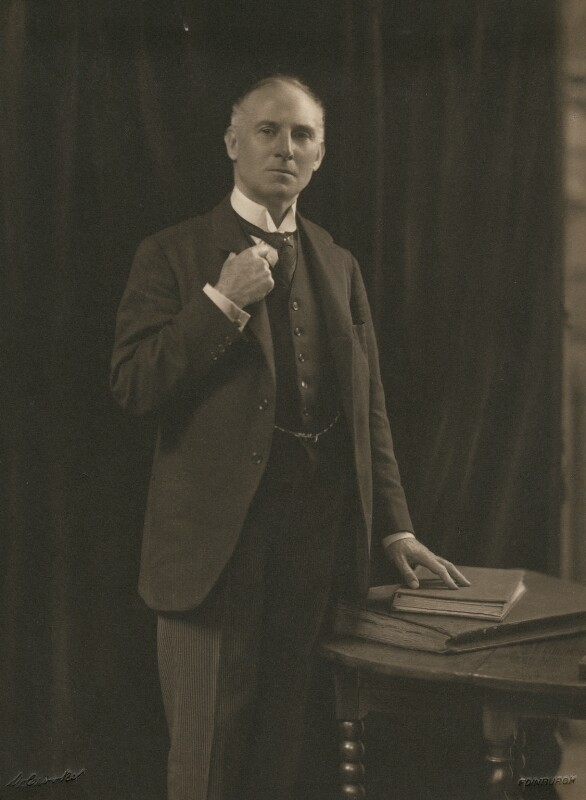

Lord Justice General
- In office 1 April 1920 – 1 April 1935
- Monarch: George V
- Preceded by: Alexander Ure
- Succeeded by: Wilfrid Normand

Lord Advocate
- In office 10 December 1916 – 25 March 1920
- Monarch: George V
- Prime Minister: David Lloyd George
- Preceded by: Robert Munro
- Succeeded by: Thomas Morison

Solicitor General for Scotland
- In office 17 October 1905 – 18 December 1905
- Prime Minister: Arthur Balfour
- Preceded by: Edward Theodore Salvesen
- Succeeded by: Alexander Ure
Parliamentary offices
Member of Parliament for Edinburgh North
In office 14 December 1918 – 25 March 1920
Preceded by	Constituency created
Succeeded by	Patrick Ford
Member of Parliament for Edinburgh West
In office 17 May 1909 – 25 November 1918
Preceded by	Lewis McIver
Succeeded by	John Gordon Jameson

Personal details
- Born: James Avon Clyde; 14 November 1863
- Died: 16 June 1944 (aged 80) Edinburgh, Scotland, UK
- Party: Unionist (1912–1944)
- Other political affiliations: Liberal Unionist (Before 1912)
- Spouse: Anna MacDiarmid
- Children: 2
- Parent: James Clyde (father)
- Education: Edinburgh Academy; University of Edinburgh

James Avon Clyde, Lord Clyde, DL, KC, PC (14 November 1863 – 16 June 1944) was a Scottish politician and judge.

== Early life and career ==
Clyde was born on 14 November 1863, the son of Dr James Clyde LLD (1821-1912). His father was a teacher at Dollar Academy and then at Edinburgh Academy.

He was educated at the Edinburgh Academy and at the University of Edinburgh, where he graduated with an MA 1884 and an LLB in 1888.

== Legal career ==
Clyde was called to the Scots Bar in 1889, and by the times he was appointed a King's Counsel (KC) in August 1901, he was the leading junior counsel in Scotland. As a KC, he was retained by several railway companies and frequently appeared before the Law Lords.

He was later Dean of the Faculty of Advocates from 1915 to 1918.

== Political career ==
He held office briefly as Solicitor General for Scotland from October 1905 to December 1905.

He was the unsuccessful Tory candidate for Clackmannanshire and Kinross-shire in 1906. He was elected at a by-election in May 1909 as the Liberal Unionist Member of Parliament (MP) for Edinburgh West, and held the seat until 1918. He was Coalition Unionist member for Edinburgh North from 1918 to 1920.

He was appointed a Privy Counsellor in December 1916. He was also appointed to the Dardanelles Commission. He served as Lord Advocate from December 1916 to 1920 in Lloyd George's coalition government. He was appointed to the bench and served as Lord Justice General and Lord President of the Court of Session from 1920 to 1935, with the judicial title Lord Clyde. During this time Lord Clyde gave this famous quote (in taxation circles) in the case of Ayrshire Pullman Motor Services v Inland Revenue [1929] 14 Tax Case 754, at 763,764:

"No man in the country is under the smallest obligation, moral or other, so to arrange his legal relations to his business or property as to enable the Inland Revenue to put the largest possible shovel in his stores. The Inland Revenue is not slow, and quite rightly, to take every advantage which is open to it under the Taxing Statutes for the purposes of depleting the taxpayer's pocket. And the taxpayer is in like manner entitled to be astute to prevent, so far as he honestly can, the depletion of his means by the Inland Revenue."

He was a Deputy Lieutenant of Kinross-shire, and later became Lord Lieutenant of Kinross-shire from 1937 until his death. He was Chairman of the Trustees of the National Library of Scotland from 1936 to 1944.

== Personal life ==
In 1895 Clyde married Anna Margaret MacDiarmid. They had two sons; the older, James Latham Clyde, later also became Lord Advocate and Lord Justice General.

Clyde died in Edinburgh on 16 June 1944.

Legal offices
Preceded by Edward Theodore Salvesen	Solicitor General for Scotland; 1905	Succeeded by Alexander Ure
Preceded by Robert Munro	Lord Advocate; 1916–1920	Succeeded by Thomas Morison
Preceded by Lord Strathclyde	Lord Justice General; 1920–1935	Succeeded by Lord Normand
Honorary titles
Preceded by Sir Henry Purvis-Russell-Montgomery	Lord Lieutenant of Kinross-shire; 1937–1944	Succeeded by Henry Keith Purvis-Russell-Montgomery
Parliament of the United Kingdom
Preceded by Lewis McIver	Member of Parliament for Edinburgh West; 1909–1918	Succeeded by John Gordon Jameson
Preceded by James Hogge as MP for Edinburgh East	Member of Parliament for Edinburgh North; 1918–1920	Succeeded by Patrick Ford
