= Bilge keel =

Nautical device

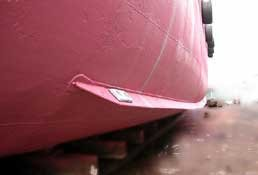
A bilge keel.

A bilge keel is a nautical device used to reduce a ship's tendency to roll. Bilge keels are employed in pairs, one for each side of the ship. A ship may have more than one bilge keel per side, but this is rare. Bilge keels increase hydrodynamic resistance, making the ship roll less. Bilge keels are passive stability systems.

On commercial shipping the bilge keel is in the form of a strake, or small keel or blister, running along much of the length of the hull. They are typically fitted one on each side, low down on the side of the hull, so as not to increase the draft of the vessel. In battleships they were often quite large and used as part of the torpedo protection system.

A bilge keel is often in a "V" shape, welded along the length of the ship at the turn of the bilge. Although not as effective as stabilizing fins, bilge keels have a major advantage in their low impact on internal ship arrangements. Unlike fins, bilge keels do not have any components inside the hull that would adversely affect cargo or mission spaces. Like fins, bilge keels have the disadvantage of increasing the hydrodynamic resistance of the vessel, thus hindering forward motion.

== Design considerations ==
When designing a bilge keel there are important decisions to consider. To minimize hydrodynamic drag the bilge keel should be placed in way of a flowline where it does not oppose crossflow. For such a usage the ends of the bilge keel should be tapered and properly faired into the hull. Also, a bilge keel should not protrude from the hull so far that the device could be damaged when the vessel is alongside a pier, even with a few degrees of adverse heel. Bilge keels on commercial vessels should not protrude below the baseline either, where they could be damaged or fouled by grounding. Note that small bilge keels are often fitted to smaller fishing boats precisely to protect the hull on drying moorings and to help keep the vessel upright.

== Effectiveness ==
A bilge keel is constructed from flat plate so as to present a sharp obstruction to roll motion. The roll damping provided by a bilge keel is more than that of a barehull ship, but falls short of other roll damping devices. Nevertheless, it is considered prudent naval architecture to install a bilge keel whenever possible as it is the only device effective in the severest of seas. Bilge keels can also be used in conjunction with other roll damping devices.

== On sailing yachts ==
Bilge keels are often fitted to smaller sailing yachts. Bilge keels minimise the draft of the vessel compared to a single fin keel thus enabling it to negotiate shallower water. Bilge keels on sailing yachts extend below the lowest point of the hull extending slightly outwards. Such an arrangement also enables the vessel to stand upright on firm sand or mud at drying moorings without the need for detachable legs, and is simpler than retractable fin keels while giving the hull greater protection. Bilge keels are not as effective as central fin keels in preventing leeway (sideways slippage) caused by crosswinds but are preferred by many small craft owners due to their other advantages.

== History ==
The first ship to be equipped with bilge keels was SS Parisian, which was launched in Scotland in 1880.

== See also ==
- Ship stability
- Stability conditions (watercraft)

== Sources ==
- Principles of Naval Architecture Vol. III, page 80. SNAME, 1988.
