= William Milligan, Lord Milligan =

Scottish politician and judge

William Milligan
- Milligan in 1952, by Walter Stoneman
- Born: 12 December 1898
- Died: 28 July 1975 (aged 76)
- Education: Sherborne School; University College, Oxford; University of Glasgow

William Rankine Milligan, Lord Milligan, PC (12 December 1898 – 28 July 1975) was a Scottish judge and Unionist politician. He served as Solicitor General for Scotland and Lord Advocate.

== Early life ==
Milligan was educated at Sherborne School, University College, Oxford, and the University of Glasgow. In the First World War, Milligan served with the Highland Light Infantry from 1917 to 1919. Milligan was a noted athlete and ran for the Achilles Club. He won the mile relay AAA Championships title at the 1920 AAA Championships, with Philip Noel-Baker, C. F. Wood and Bevil Rudd.

== Legal career ==
Milligan was admitted as an advocate in 1925, and appointed a King's Counsel in 1945. He was appointed Solicitor General for Scotland from 1951 to 1954, and Lord Advocate from 1955 to 1960, and was made a Privy Counsellor in 1955. He was appointed to the College of Justice in 1960, with the judicial title Lord Milligan.

== Politics ==
Milligan was an unsuccessful parliamentary candidate at Glasgow St Rollox in 1945 and again at Central Ayrshire in 1950 and 1951, and was elected for Edinburgh North in a 1955 by-election, where he then served until 1960.

== Family ==
His son James Milligan, Lord Milligan was a Senator of the College of Justice.

Parliament of the United Kingdom
Preceded by James Latham Clyde	Member of Parliament for Edinburgh North; 1955–1960	Succeeded by Earl of Dalkeith
Legal offices
Preceded by Douglas Johnston	Solicitor General for Scotland; 1951–1954	Succeeded by William Grant
Preceded by James Latham Clyde	Lord Advocate; 1955–1960	Succeeded by William Grant
