= Leigh (constituency) =

Parliamentary constituency in the United Kingdom, 1885–2024

Coordinates: 53°30′N 2°30′W

- Former county constituency for the House of Commons
- Boundary of Leigh in Greater Manchester

- Location of Greater Manchester within England
- County: Greater Manchester
- Electorate: 77,001 (December 2010)
- Major settlements: Leigh, Astley, Tyldesley, Lowton, Golborne

1885–2024
- Seats: One
- Created from: South West Lancashire
- Replaced by: Leigh and Atherton

Leigh was a constituency (Note: A borough constituency (for the purposes of election expenses and type of returning officer)) in Greater Manchester represented in the House of Commons of the UK Parliament.

From 2019 to 2024, Leigh was held by James Grundy of the Conservative Party. Before this, the seat was represented by Andy Burnham of the Labour Party, who served as the MP from 2001, was Health Secretary in the government of Gordon Brown, Shadow Health Secretary in Ed Miliband's Shadow Cabinet, and Shadow Home Secretary under Jeremy Corbyn, until October 2016. (Note: As with all constituencies, the constituency elects one Member of Parliament (MP) by the first past the post system of election at least every five years.) Burnham stood down following his victory at the 2017 Greater Manchester mayoral election, and was succeeded by the Labour and Co-operative Party's Jo Platt who was MP from 2017 to 2019. Burnham continued to reside in Leigh while he was Mayor of Greater Manchester from 2017 to 2026.

The constituency was abolished as a result of the 2023 Periodic Review of Westminster constituencies. With the addition of the town of Atherton, it was reformed as Leigh and Atherton, and was first contested in the 2024 general election.

== Constituency profile ==
Leigh in Lancashire, boundaries used 1974–1983

Map of boundaries 2010–2024

Leigh was a marginal seat in the south of the Metropolitan Borough of Wigan and on the border with Warrington, with virtually all wards held by the Labour Party at local level, although also containing the more Conservative-inclined area of Lowton East. In line with the wider borough of Wigan it voted by a majority to Leave the European Union in the 2016 referendum, but has slightly lower levels of deprivation than the town of Wigan itself, and is mostly made of skilled working-class families in residential areas, with some light industry, all factors in the swing towards the Conservatives in 2019. Leigh, Tyldesley and Golborne are former mill and mining towns undergoing urban regeneration. Pennington Flash in between Lowton and Leigh is an important local nature reserve and area of natural regeneration in a former mining area.

== Boundaries ==
Following the review of parliamentary representation in Greater Manchester in 2009, the Boundary Commission for England recommended alterations to constituencies in the Wigan area. The electoral wards used in the altered Leigh constituency were:

- Astley, Mosley Common, Atherleigh, Golborne and Lowton West, Leigh East, Leigh South, Leigh West, Lowton East and Tyldesley, all from the Metropolitan Borough of Wigan.

== History ==
The constituency was created in the Redistribution of Seats Act 1885 as a result of the South West Lancashire constituency being divided into eight single member seats. Between 1922 and December 2019, candidates belonging to the Labour Party had continuously served the seat, which for the political party made it one of their longest held constituencies. One recent Labour incumbent was Andy Burnham, Shadow Home Secretary from September 2015 to October 2016 and became Mayor of Greater Manchester in 2017, and became UK Prime Minister in 2026.

== Members of Parliament ==
Election	Member	Party
1885	Caleb Wright	Liberal
1895	C. P. Scott	Liberal
1906	Sir John Brunner	Liberal
January 1910	Peter Raffan	Liberal
1922	Henry Twist	Labour
1923	John Tinker	Labour
1945	Harold Boardman	Labour
1979	Lawrence Cunliffe	Labour
2001	Andy Burnham	Labour Co-op
2017	Jo Platt	Labour Co-op
2019	James Grundy	Conservative
2024	constituency abolished	

== Elections ==
=== Elections in the 2010s ===
General election 2019: Leigh
Party	Candidate	Votes	%	±%
Conservative	James Grundy	21,266	45.3	+9.5
Labour Co-op	Jo Platt	19,301	41.1	−15.1
Brexit Party	James Melly	3,161	6.7	New
Liberal Democrats	Mark Clayton	2,252	4.8	+2.8
Independent	Ann O'Bern	551	1.2	New
UKIP	Leon Peters	448	0.9	−5.0
Majority		1,965	4.2	N/A
Turnout		46,979	60.9	−0.6
Conservative gain from Labour Co-op		Swing	+12.3	

The 2019 result saw the largest 2017 majority for a party overturned in the country. It also saw the largest fall in the UKIP vote share.

General election 2017: Leigh
Party	Candidate	Votes	%	±%
Labour Co-op	Jo Platt	26,347	56.2	+2.3
Conservative	James Grundy	16,793	35.8	+13.2
UKIP	Mark Bradley	2,783	5.9	−13.8
Liberal Democrats	Richard Kilpatrick	951	2.0	−0.5
Majority		9,554	20.4	−10.1
Turnout		46,874	61.5	+4.1
Labour Co-op hold		Swing	−5.4	

General election 2015: Leigh
Party	Candidate	Votes	%	±%
Labour	Andy Burnham	24,312	53.9	+5.9
Conservative	Louisa Townson	10,216	22.6	+1.7
UKIP	Les Leggett	8,903	19.7	+16.2
Liberal Democrats	Bill Winlow	1,150	2.5	−15.7
TUSC	Stephen Hall	542	1.2	New
Majority		14,096	31.3	+4.2
Turnout		45,123	59.4	−2.6
Labour hold		Swing	+2.0	

General election 2010: Leigh
Party	Candidate	Votes	%	±%
Labour	Andy Burnham	21,295	48.0	−15.3
Conservative	Shazia Awan	9,284	20.9	+3.2
Liberal Democrats	Chris Blackburn	8,049	18.2	−2.1
BNP	Gary Chadwick	2,724	6.1	New
UKIP	Mary Lavelle	1,535	3.5	New
Independent	Norman Bradbury	988	2.2	New
Independent	Terry Dainty	320	0.7	New
Christian	Ryan Hessell	137	0.3	New
Majority		12,011	27.1	−20.2
Turnout		44,332	62.0	+10.7
Labour hold		Swing	−4.9	

=== Elections in the 2000s ===
General election 2005: Leigh
Party	Candidate	Votes	%	±%
Labour	Andy Burnham	23,097	63.3	−1.2
Conservative	Laurance Wedderburn	5,825	16.0	−2.2
Liberal Democrats	Dave Crowther	4,962	13.6	+0.8
Community Action	Ian Franzen	2,185	6.0	New
Legalise Cannabis	Thomas Hampson	415	1.1	New
Majority		17,272	47.3	+1.0
Turnout		36,484	50.3	+0.6
Labour hold		Swing	+0.5	

General election 2001: Leigh
Party	Candidate	Votes	%	±%
Labour	Andy Burnham	22,783	64.5	−4.4
Conservative	Andrew Oxley	6,421	18.2	+2.6
Liberal Democrats	Ray Atkins	4,524	12.8	+1.6
Socialist Labour	William Kelly	820	2.3	New
UKIP	Chris Best	750	2.1	New
Majority		16,362	46.3	−7.0
Turnout		35,298	49.7	−16.0
Labour hold		Swing	−3.5	

=== Elections in the 1990s ===
General election 1997: Leigh
Party	Candidate	Votes	%	±%
Labour Co-op	Lawrence Cunliffe	31,652	68.9	+7.6
Conservative	Edward Young	7,156	15.6	−9.9
Liberal Democrats	Peter Hough	5,163	11.2	−1.4
Referendum	Roy Constable	1,949	4.2	New
Majority		24,496	53.3	+17.5
Turnout		45,920	65.7	−9.3
Labour hold		Swing	+8.8	

General election 1992: Leigh
Party	Candidate	Votes	%	±%
Labour	Lawrence Cunliffe	32,225	61.3	+2.7
Conservative	Joseph Egerton	13,398	25.5	−0.8
Liberal Democrats	Robert Bleakley	6,621	12.6	−2.5
Natural Law	Adrian Tayler	320	0.6	New
Majority		18,827	35.8	+3.5
Turnout		52,564	75.0	+0.9
Labour hold		Swing	+1.7	

=== Elections in the 1980s ===
General election 1987: Leigh
Party	Candidate	Votes	%	±%
Labour	Lawrence Cunliffe	30,064	58.6	+7.4
Conservative	Louis Brown	13,458	26.3	−0.5
SDP	Steven Jones	7,743	15.1	−6.2
Majority		16,606	32.3	+7.7
Turnout		51,265	74.1	+1.9
Labour hold		Swing		

General election 1983: Leigh
Party	Candidate	Votes	%	±%
Labour	Lawrence Cunliffe	25,477	51.2	−2.9
Conservative	Paul Johnstone	13,163	26.8	−9.7
SDP	David Eccles	10,468	21.3	New
Majority		12,314	24.6	+7.0
Turnout		49,108	72.2	−4.7
Labour hold		Swing		

=== Elections in the 1970s ===
General election 1979: Leigh
Party	Candidate	Votes	%	±%
Labour	Lawrence Cunliffe	27,736	54.1	−2.1
Conservative	David Lawrence Shaw	18,713	36.5	+10.7
Liberal	Michael Godwin	4,796	9.4	−8.6
Majority		9,023	17.6	−12.8
Turnout		51,245	76.9	+3.0
Labour hold		Swing		

General election October 1974: Leigh
Party	Candidate	Votes	%	±%
Labour	Harold Boardman	27,036	56.2	+5.2
Conservative	Maureen Williams	12,401	25.8	+1.2
Liberal	Roy D. Pemberton	8,640	18.0	−6.4
Majority		14,635	30.4	+4.0
Turnout		48,077	73.9	−6.1
Labour hold		Swing	+2.0	

General election February 1974: Leigh
Party	Candidate	Votes	%	±%
Labour	Harold Boardman	26,310	51.0	−7.2
Conservative	William Legge	12,663	24.6	−8.9
Liberal	Roy D. Pemberton	12,594	24.4	New
Majority		13,647	26.4	−1.3
Turnout		51,567	80.0	+9.0
Labour hold		Swing		

General election 1970: Leigh
Party	Candidate	Votes	%	±%
Labour	Harold Boardman	26,625	58.2	−10.5
Conservative	James Peter McGuire	15,314	33.5	+2.2
Ratepayers	Joseph Knowles	3,776	8.3	New
Majority		11,311	27.7	−9.6
Turnout		45,715	71.0	−3.3
Labour hold		Swing		

=== Elections in the 1960s ===
General election 1966: Leigh
Party	Candidate	Votes	%	±%
Labour	Harold Boardman	29,552	68.7	+1.2
Conservative	Robert R Hipkiss	13,490	31.3	−1.2
Majority		16,062	37.4	+2.4
Turnout		43,042	74.3	−3.3
Labour hold		Swing		

General election 1964: Leigh
Party	Candidate	Votes	%	±%
Labour	Harold Boardman	30,102	67.5	+2.3
Conservative	Neville Montague B Brown	14,478	32.5	−2.3
Majority		15,624	35.0	+4.6
Turnout		44,580	77.6	−4.8
Labour hold		Swing		

=== Elections in the 1950s ===
General election 1959: Leigh
Party	Candidate	Votes	%	±%
Labour	Harold Boardman	31,672	65.2	+2.8
Conservative	William Cameron	16,897	34.8	−2.6
Majority		14,775	30.4	+5.6
Turnout		48,569	82.4	−17.6
Labour hold		Swing		

General election 1955: Leigh
Party	Candidate	Votes	%	±%
Labour	Harold Boardman	30,098	62.4	−1.0
Conservative	John Bryan Leck	18,142	37.6	+1.0
Majority		11,956	24.8	−2.0
Turnout		48,240	80.0	−6.0
Labour hold		Swing		

General election 1951: Leigh
Party	Candidate	Votes	%	±%
Labour	Harold Boardman	33,881	63.4	−0.1
Conservative	Henry Donald Moore	19,585	36.6	+0.1
Majority		14,296	26.8	−0.2
Turnout		53,466	86.0	−1.4
Labour hold		Swing		

General election 1950: Leigh
Party	Candidate	Votes	%	±%
Labour	Harold Boardman	34,320	63.5	−6.3
Conservative	John W Whiteley	19,720	36.5	+6.3
Majority		14,600	27.0	−12.6
Turnout		54,040	87.4	+6.4
Labour hold		Swing		

=== Elections in the 1940s ===
General election 1945: Leigh
Party	Candidate	Votes	%	±%
Labour	Harold Boardman	32,447	69.8	N/A
Conservative	Eric Heriot Hill	14,029	30.2	N/A
Majority		18,418	39.6	N/A
Turnout		46,476	81.0	N/A
Labour hold		Swing		

=== Elections in the 1930s ===
General election 1935: Leigh
Party	Candidate	Votes	%	±%
Labour	Joe Tinker	Unopposed	N/A	N/A
Labour hold		Swing	N/A	

General election 1931: Leigh
Party	Candidate	Votes	%	±%
Labour	Joe Tinker	23,965	52.32	
Conservative	Peter Eckersley	21,837	47.68	
Majority		2,128	4.64	
Turnout		45,802	87.38	
Labour hold		Swing		

=== Elections in the 1920s ===
General election 1929: Leigh
Party	Candidate	Votes	%	±%
Labour	Joe Tinker	25,635	57.0	+5.5
Unionist	Claude Herbert Grundy	10,942	24.3	−24.2
Liberal	Thomas Hardy	8,435	18.7	New
Majority		14,693	32.7	+29.7
Turnout		45,012	88.3	+0.1
Registered electors		50,982		
Labour hold		Swing	+14.9	

General election 1924: Leigh
Party	Candidate	Votes	%	±%
Labour	Joe Tinker	17,262	51.5	+8.5
Unionist	Edwin Owen	16,247	48.5	+21.8
Majority		1,015	3.0	−9.7
Turnout		33,509	88.2	+1.7
Registered electors		38,010		
Labour hold		Swing	−6.7	

General election 1923: Leigh
Party	Candidate	Votes	%	±%
Labour	Joe Tinker	13,989	43.0	−2.0
Liberal	Robert Burrows	9,854	30.3	+9.2
Unionist	Herbert Metcalfe (magistrate)	8,664	26.7	−7.2
Majority		4,135	12.7	+1.6
Turnout		32,507	86.5	−3.4
Registered electors		37,597		
Labour hold		Swing	−5.6	

General election 1922: Leigh
Party	Candidate	Votes	%	±%
Labour	Henry Twist	15,006	45.0	−1.4
Unionist	Herbert Metcalfe	11,279	33.9	New
Liberal	Joseph Ashworth	7,012	21.1	−32.5
Majority		3,727	11.1	N/A
Turnout		33,297	89.9	+23.0
Registered electors		37,050		
Labour gain from Liberal		Swing	+15.6	

=== Elections in the 1910s ===
General election 1918: Leigh
Party	Candidate	Votes	%	±%
Liberal	Peter Raffan	12,892	53.6	−1.6
Labour	Richard Owen Jones	11,146	46.4	New
Majority		1,746	7.2	−3.2
Turnout		24,038	66.9	−20.0
Registered electors		35,912		
Liberal hold		Swing	−1.6	

General Election 1914–15

Another General Election was required to take place before the end of 1915. The political parties had been making preparations for an election to take place and by the July 1914, the following candidates had been selected:

- Liberal: Peter Raffan
- Unionist: Frank Hatchard
- Labour: Thomas Greenall

General election December 1910: Leigh
Party	Candidate	Votes	%	±%
Liberal	Peter Raffan	6,790	55.2	+15.0
Conservative	William Thomas Oversby	5,507	44.8	+9.7
Majority		1,283	10.4	+5.3
Turnout		12,297	86.9	−6.7
Registered electors		14,150		
Liberal hold		Swing	+2.6	

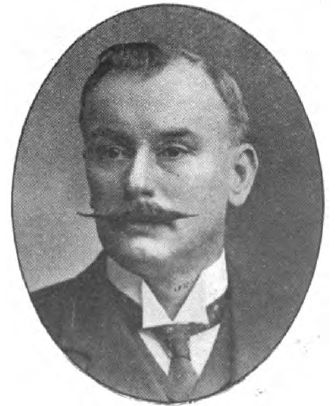
Greenall

General election January 1910: Leigh
Party	Candidate	Votes	%	±%
Liberal	Peter Raffan	5,325	40.2	−17.9
Conservative	F Cuthbert Smith	4,646	35.1	−6.8
Labour	Thomas Greenall	3,268	24.7	New
Majority		679	5.1	−11.1
Turnout		13,239	93.6	+1.3
Registered electors		14,150		
Liberal hold		Swing	−5.6	

=== Elections in the 1900s ===
Brunner

General election 1906: Leigh
Party	Candidate	Votes	%	±%
Liberal	John Brunner	7,175	58.1	+7.5
Conservative	Donald MacMaster	5,169	41.9	−7.5
Majority		2,006	16.2	+15.0
Turnout		12,344	92.3	+5.3
Registered electors		13,380		
Liberal hold		Swing	+7.5	

General election 1900: Leigh
Party	Candidate	Votes	%	±%
Liberal	C. P. Scott	5,239	50.6	−2.9
Conservative	William Walter Augustine Fitzgerald	5,119	49.4	+2.9
Majority		120	1.2	−5.8
Turnout		10,358	87.0	−2.0
Registered electors		11,907		
Liberal hold		Swing	−2.9	

=== Elections in the 1890s ===
Scott

General election 1895: Leigh
Party	Candidate	Votes	%	±%
Liberal	C. P. Scott	5,130	53.5	−1.6
Conservative	William Walter Augustine Fitzgerald	4,453	46.5	+1.6
Majority		677	7.0	−3.2
Turnout		9,583	89.0	−1.4
Registered electors		10,763		
Liberal hold		Swing	−1.6	

General election 1892: Leigh
Party	Candidate	Votes	%	±%
Liberal	Caleb Wright	4,899	55.1	−2.7
Conservative	William Charles Jones	3,995	44.9	+2.7
Majority		904	10.2	−5.4
Turnout		8,894	90.4	+3.7
Registered electors		9,839		
Liberal hold		Swing	−2.7	

=== Elections in the 1880s ===
Myers

General election 1886: Leigh
Party	Candidate	Votes	%	±%
Liberal	Caleb Wright	4,297	57.8	−0.7
Conservative	William Myers	3,134	42.2	+0.7
Majority		1,163	15.6	−1.4
Turnout		7,431	86.7	−5.4
Registered electors		8,572		
Liberal hold		Swing	−0.7	

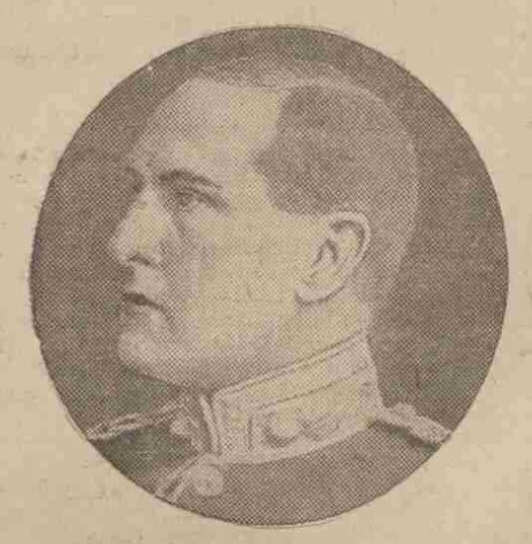
Knowles

General election 1885: Leigh
Party	Candidate	Votes	%	±%
Liberal	Caleb Wright	4,621	58.5	
Conservative	Lees Knowles	3,275	41.5	
Majority		1,346	17.0	
Turnout		7,896	92.1	
Registered electors		8,572		
Liberal win (new seat)				

== See also ==
- List of parliamentary constituencies in Greater Manchester
