= 1909 Edinburgh West by-election =

UK parliamentary by-election

The 1909 Edinburgh West by-election was held on 17 May 1909. The by-election was held due to the resignation of the incumbent Liberal Unionist MP, Lewis McIver. It was won by the Liberal Unionist candidate James Avon Clyde, who was unopposed.
