= James Latham Clyde, Lord Clyde =

Scottish Unionist politician and judge

The Right Honourable Lord Clyde PC
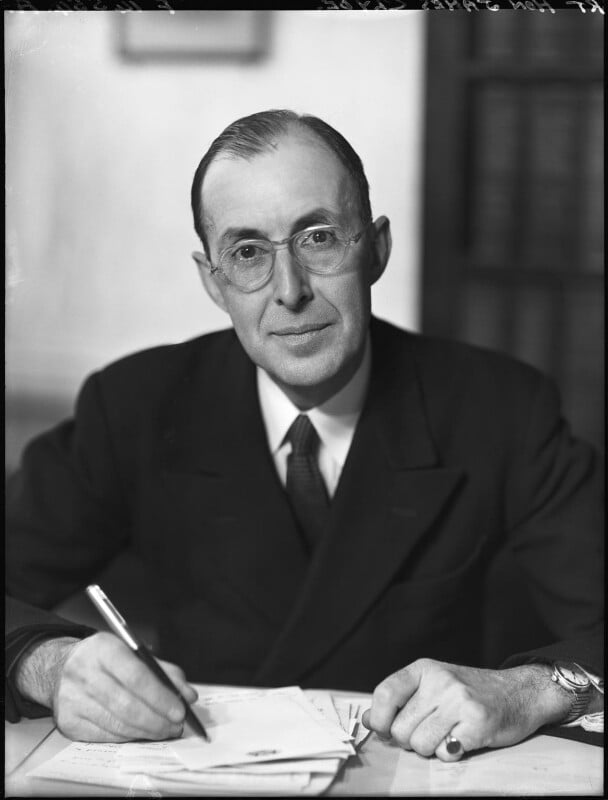
- Clyde in 1951

Lord Justice General
- In office 23 December 1954 – 25 April 1972
- Preceded by: The Lord Cooper of Culross
- Succeeded by: The Lord Emslie

Lord Advocate
- In office 7 November 1951 – 6 January 1955
- Preceded by: John Wheatley
- Succeeded by: William Milligan
Parliamentary Representation
Member of Parliament for Edinburgh North
In office 23 February 1950 – 23 December 1954
Preceded by	George Willis
Succeeded by	William Milligan

Personal details
- Born: 30 October 1898
- Died: 30 June 1975 (aged 76)
- Party: Unionist

James Latham McDiarmid Clyde, Lord Clyde, PC (30 October 1898 – 30 June 1975) was a Scottish Unionist politician and judge.

== Life ==
Born on 30 October 1898 at Heriot Row, Edinburgh, Clyde was the eldest son of Anna Margaret McDiarmid (d. 1956), (daughter of Professor Peter Wallwork Latham of Cambridge) and James Avon Clyde, Lord Clyde. He was educated at Edinburgh Academy, Trinity College, Oxford and the University of Edinburgh, and was admitted as an advocate in 1924 and as a King's Counsel in 1936.

He was an unsuccessful parliamentary candidate for Midlothian South and Peebles at the 1945 general election, and was elected as Member of Parliament for Edinburgh North at the 1950 election, holding the seat until December 1954.

He was appointed a Privy Counsellor and Lord Advocate in 1951, and in 1954 was raised to the bench as Lord President, with the judicial title Lord Clyde. He held this office until 1972. His father had previously also served as Lord Advocate and Lord President.

His son, James Clyde, Baron Clyde became a member of the Court of Session and latterly a Law Lord.

== Sources ==
- Leigh Rayment's Historical List of MPs
- Who Was Who

Parliament of the United Kingdom
Preceded by George Willis	Member of Parliament for Edinburgh North; 1950–1954	Succeeded by William Milligan
Legal offices
Preceded by John Wheatley	Lord Advocate; 1951–1954	Succeeded by William Milligan
Preceded by Lord Cooper of Culross	Lord Justice General and Lord President of the Court of Session; 1954–1972	Succeeded by Lord Emslie
