= Lawrence Cunliffe =

British politician (1929–2025)

Member of Parliament for Leigh
- In office 3 May 1979 – 14 May 2001
- Preceded by: Harold Boardman
- Succeeded by: Andy Burnham

Personal details
- Born: Lawrence Francis Cunlifffe; 25 March 1929 Walkden, Lancashire, England
- Died: 7 February 2025 (aged 95)
- Party: Labour

Lawrence Francis Cunliffe (25 March 1929 – 7 February 2025) was a British Labour Party politician. He was a Member of Parliament (MP) for Leigh from 1979 to 2001.

== Early life ==
Cunliffe was born in Walkden, Lancashire on 25 March 1929. He was a National Coal Board engineer, and became involved in the National Union of Mineworkers.

== Parliamentary career ==
Cunliffe first stood for Parliament in Rochdale. There, he lost the previously Labour-held seat to the Liberal candidate Cyril Smith at a by-election in 1972, and was again defeated by Smith at the subsequent general election in February 1974.

He served as a Member of Parliament for Leigh from 1979 until he retired from the House of Commons at the 2001 general election.

== Death ==
Cunliffe died on 7 February 2025, at the age of 95.

== Sources ==
- Leigh Rayment's Historical List of MPs

Parliament of the United Kingdom
| Preceded by Harold Boardman | Member of Parliament for Leigh; 1979–2001 | Succeeded by Andy Burnham |
