= Henry Twist =

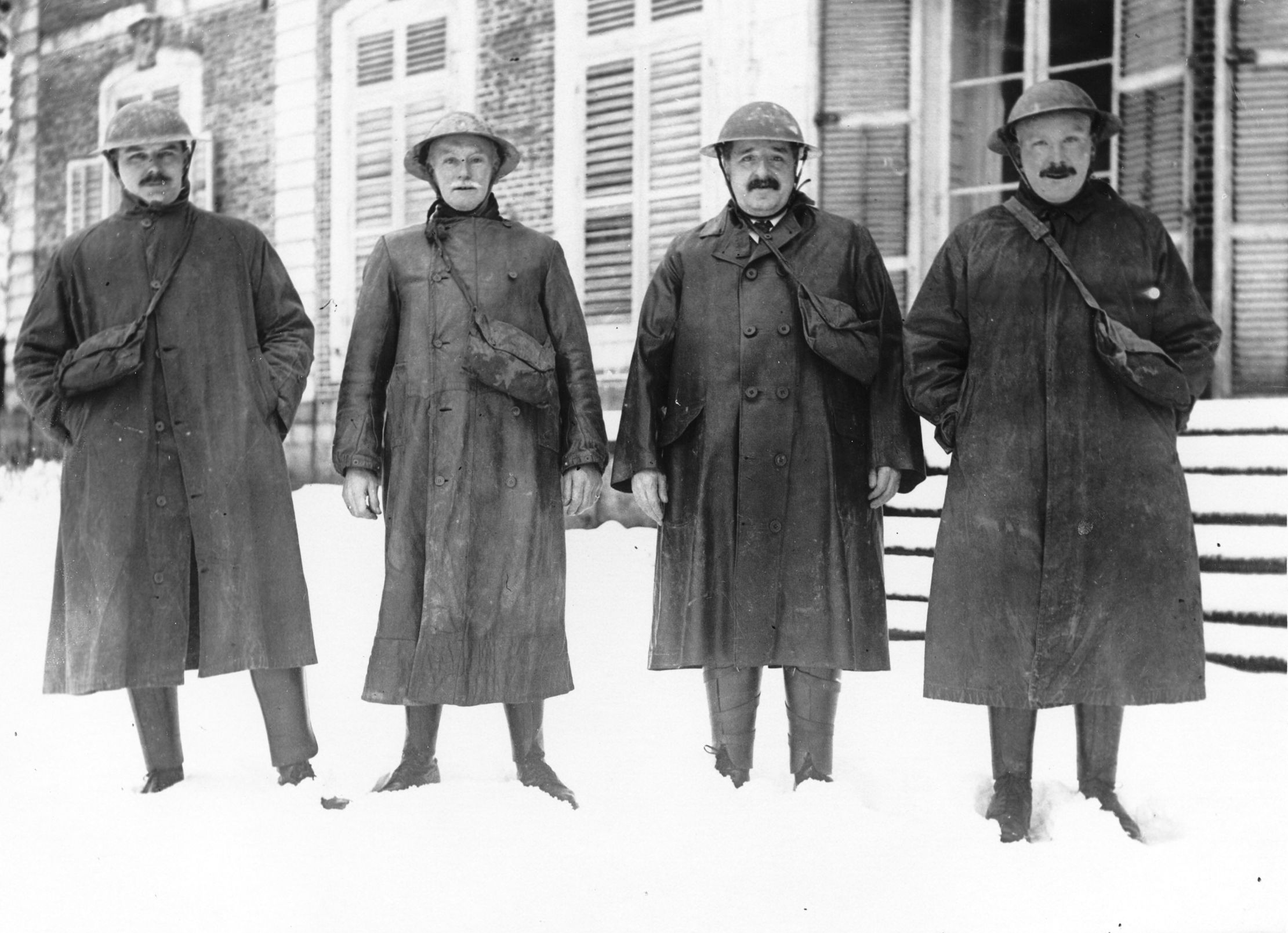
Henry Twist, third from left, with Henry Roughley, Thomas Greenall and John McGurk visiting the Western Front in World War I, believed to be discussing mining under enemy lines

Henry Twist (30 January 1870 – 16 May 1934) was a British miner's agent and Labour politician.

Twist was born at Platt Bridge, near Wigan, Lancashire, and after primary education at the local Wesleyan School, began employment at Bamfurlong coal mine at the age of eleven. At the age of thirty he became a checkweighman at the mine, having also been elected to the Wigan Rural District Council. In 1906 he succeeded Sam Woods as the area's agent for the Lancashire and Cheshire Miners' Federation, and was the organisation's vice-president in 1929. He subsequently served on the executive of the Miners' Federation of Great Britain.

Twist was twice elected to the House of Commons as a Labour Member of Parliament. At the January 1910 general election he became Wigan's first Labour MP. However he was defeated at the subsequent contest in December of the same year. At the 1922 general election he was returned as member for Leigh, another Lancashire coal-mining constituency. However he was forced to retire due to ill health and did not stand at the subsequent election in 1923.

Henry Twist died in Blackpool in May 1934, aged 64.

Parliament of the United Kingdom
Preceded by Sir Francis Powell	Member of Parliament for Wigan; January 1910–December 1910	Succeeded by Reginald Neville
Preceded by Peter Raffan	Member of Parliament for Leigh; 1922–1923	Succeeded by Joe Tinker
