= Lewis McIver =

British politician (1846–1920)

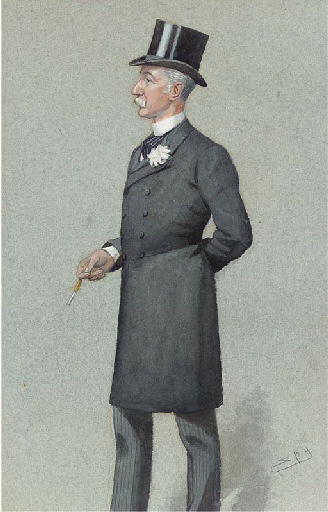
"the Member for Scotland" McIver as caricatured by Spy (Leslie Ward) in Vanity Fair, July 1896

Sir Lewis McIver, 1st Baronet (6 March 1846 – 9 August 1920) was a British Liberal Unionist politician who sat in the House of Commons between 1885 and 1909.

== Biography ==
McIver was the son of John McIver, secretary of the Presidency Bank of Madras. He was educated at Kensington Grammar School and at Bonn University. He served for a while in the Indian Civil Service and was called to the bar at Middle Temple in 1878.

McIver was elected as the Member of Parliament for Torquay at the 1885 general election, and represented it until his defeat in 1886. He joined the Liberal Unionist Party at the split in 1886, and unsuccessfully contested Edinburgh South at the 1892 general election. He returned to the Commons after a nine-year absence when he was elected at a by-election in May 1895 as the MP for Edinburgh West. He was created a baronet on 23 July 1896, and held his seat in Parliament until he resigned on 12 May 1909 by the procedural device of accepting appointment as Steward of the Manor of Northstead.

Escutcheon of the McIver baronets of Sarisbury

On 2 December 1896 McIver was appointed Honorary Colonel of the 1st Edinburgh (City) Royal Garrison Artillery (Volunteers), and subsequently of the Forth Royal Garrison Artillery (Territorial Force).

McIver worked in finance in the City of London following his retirement from politics. He died in 1920 at Beechwood, his house in Highgate, London, and the baronetcy became extinct.

== Family ==
McIver married Charlotte Rosalind Montefiore, daughter of Nathaniel Montefiore and Emma Goldsmid, on 11 September 1884. The couple had two daughters.

Parliament of the United Kingdom
New constituency	Member of Parliament for Torquay; 1885–1886	Succeeded by Richard Mallock
Preceded by Viscount Wolmer	Member of Parliament for Edinburgh West; 1895–1909	Succeeded by James Avon Clyde
Baronetage of the United Kingdom
New creation	Baronet (of Sarisbury); 1896–1920	Extinct
Preceded by Dalgleish baronets	McIver baronets of Sarisbury; 23 July 1896	Succeeded by Verdin baronets
