= Alexander Erskine-Hill =

Scottish politician (1894–1947)

Sir Alexander Galloway Erskine Erskine-Hill, 1st Baronet (3 April 1894 – 6 June 1947) was a Scottish Unionist Party politician.

He was member of parliament (MP) for Edinburgh North from 1935 to 1945.

He was originally a Liberal, contesting North Lanark for that party in 1918, but identified with the Unionists by 1928, speaking at a large number of party meetings. At the time of his election in Edinburgh North he was Advocate Deputy to the Lord Advocate and the standing junior counsel to the Department of Agriculture in Scotland.

He was created a baronet of Quothquhan in the County of Lanark on 22 June 1945.

Parliament of the United Kingdom
Preceded by Sir Patrick Ford, Bt.	Member of Parliament for Edinburgh North; 1935–1945	Succeeded by George Willis
Baronetage of the United Kingdom
New creation	Baronet (of Quothquhan); 1946–1947	Succeeded by Robert Erskine-Hill
