= Sir Patrick Ford, 1st Baronet =

Scottish politician (1880–1945)

Sir Patrick Ford

Member of Parliament for Edinburgh North
- In office 29 October 1924 – 14 November 1935
- Preceded by: Peter Raffan
- Succeeded by: Alexander Erskine-Hill
- In office 22 April 1920 – 6 December 1923
- Preceded by: James Clyde
- Succeeded by: Peter Raffan

Personal details
- Born: Patrick Johnstone Ford; 5 March 1880
- Died: 28 September 1945 (aged 65)
- Party: Unionist (1912–1944)
- Other political affiliations: Liberal Unionist (Before 1912)

Sir Patrick Johnstone Ford, 1st Baronet (5 March 1880 – 28 September 1945) was a Scottish Unionist Party politician.

== Early life and career ==
From around 1905 he was the main artistic patron of Patrick Adam.

== Political career ==
For fought Edinburgh East as a Liberal Unionist at a by-election in 1909 and at the first general election of 1910, being defeated both times by the Liberal candidate in a straight fight.

Ford was elected as member of parliament (MP) for Edinburgh North on his first attempt, at a by-election in 1920. He was re-elected in 1922 general election, but was defeated in 1923 by the Liberal Party candidate Peter Raffan. He regained the seat at the 1924 general election, and held it until he stepped down at the 1935 general election.

== Personal life ==
Ford was made a Knight Bachelor in the 1926 New Year Honours, as well as being made a baronet of Westerdunes in the County of East Lothian on 27 July 1929. He was appointed Honorary Colonel of the Forth Heavy Brigade, Royal Artillery, on 26 June 1926.

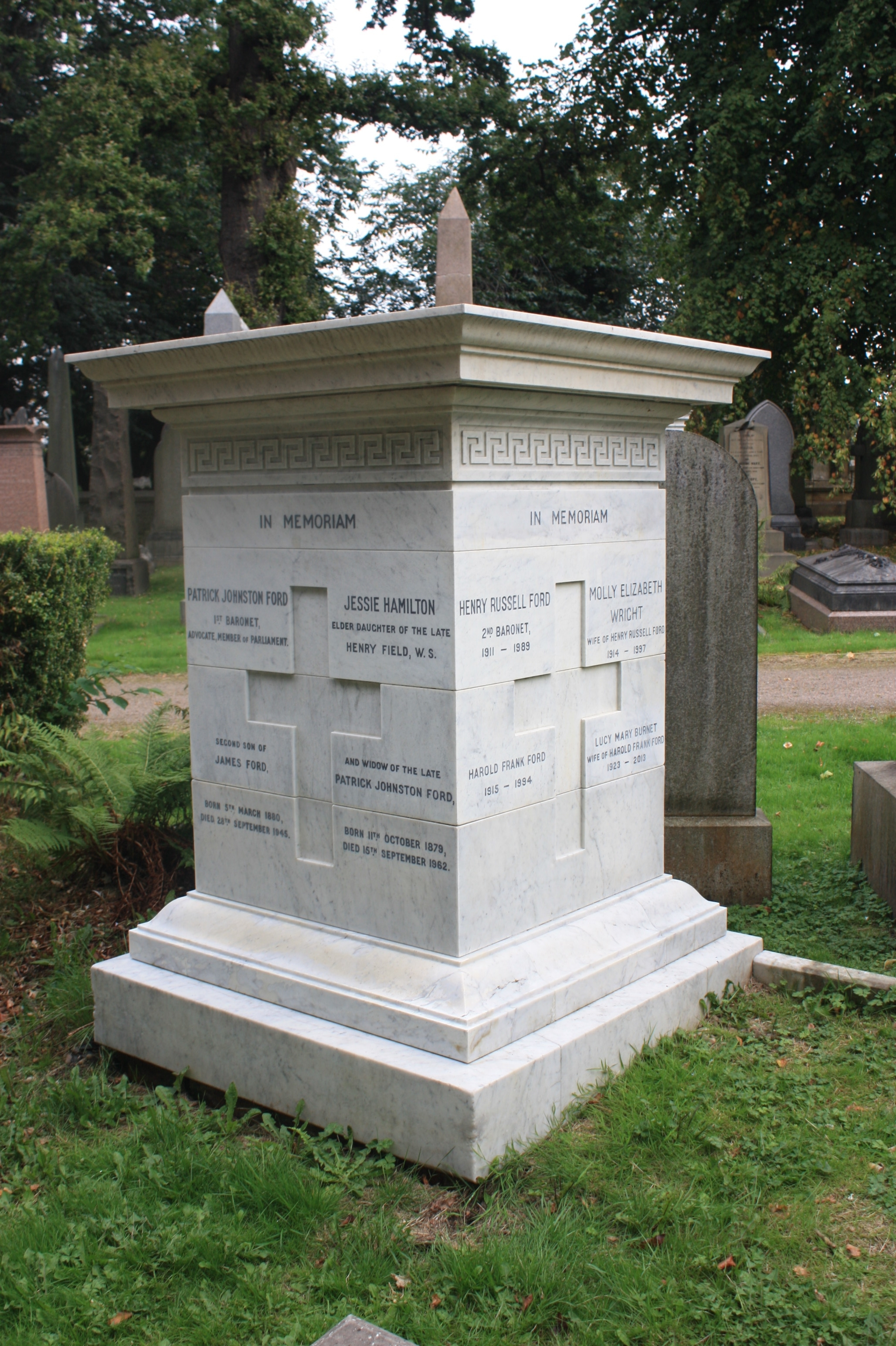
Ford baronets grave, Dean Cemetery

He is buried with his wife and son near the centre of Dean Cemetery in Edinburgh.

Parliament of the United Kingdom
Preceded by James Avon Clyde	Member of Parliament for Edinburgh North; 1920–1923	Succeeded by Peter Raffan
Preceded by Peter Raffan	Member of Parliament for Edinburgh North; 1924–1935	Succeeded by Alexander Erskine-Hill
Baronetage of the United Kingdom
New creation	Baronet (of Westerdunes); 1929–1945	Succeeded by Henry Russell Ford
