= Peter Raffan =

British politician

Member of Parliament for Edinburgh North
- In office 6 December 1923 – 9 October 1924
- Preceded by: Patrick Ford
- Succeeded by: Patrick Ford
- Majority: 2,835

Member of Parliament for Leigh
- In office 15 January 1910 – 26 October 1922
- Preceded by: John Brunner
- Succeeded by: Henry Twist

Personal details
- Born: 1863
- Died: 23 June 1940
- Party: Liberal

Peter Wilson Raffan (1863 – 23 June 1940) was a British Liberal politician. Raffan came from Newbridge, Monmouthshire, and in 1910 was chairman of the Monmouthshire County Council. When a general election was called in January 1910, P W Raffan was selected as Liberal candidate for Leigh in south Lancashire. John Brunner, the sitting Liberal Member of Parliament, had chosen to stand in Northwich.

The constituency contained a large number of coalminers, and Raffan was opposed not only by the Conservatives, but by Thomas Greenall of the Labour Party, who was a leader of the Lancashire and Cheshire Miners' Federation. Leigh was one of the few seats where Labour and Liberals ran against each other. Raffan won the seat easily. In the Commons Raffan became secretary of the Land Values Group who sought reform in property taxation. He supported women's suffrage, disestablishment of the Church in Wales and the temperance movement.

At the 1918 general election Raffan was re-elected at Leigh as a Liberal and received the "coupon" despite being an opponent of the Coalition Government. At the 1922 election he stood unsuccessfully for election as a Liberal at Ayr Burghs.

At the succeeding 1923 general election he successfully contested Edinburgh North for the Liberals, unseating the Unionist MP, Patrick Johnstone Ford. He only held the seat for one year, with Ford regaining the seat in the 1924 general election.

Parliament of the United Kingdom
Preceded by John Brunner	Member of Parliament for Leigh; January 1910–1922	Succeeded by Henry Twist
Preceded by Patrick Ford	Member of Parliament for Edinburgh North; 1923–1924	Succeeded by Patrick Ford
