= Paul Emrys-Evans =

British Conservative Party politician

Member of Parliament for South Derbyshire
- In office 1931–1945
- Preceded by: David Graham Pole
- Succeeded by: Arthur Champion

Under-Secretary of State for Dominion Affairs
- In office 1942–1945
- Preceded by: Geoffrey Shakespeare
- Succeeded by: John Parker

Personal details
- Born: 1 April 1894
- Died: 26 October 1967 (aged 73) Nice, France
- Party: Conservative

Paul Vychan Emrys-Evans (1 April 1894 – 26 October 1967) was a British Conservative Party politician.

Having stood unsuccessfully at Leicester West in 1929, he was elected as Member of Parliament (MP) for South Derbyshire in 1931. He served as the constituency's MP until his defeat by a Labour candidate, Arthur Champion, in 1945. Emrys-Evans was Under-Secretary of State for Dominion Affairs from 1942 to 1945.

After Emrys-Evans's death Lord Salisbury wrote of him in The Times (3 November 1967): "There are men who shine in the public eye, whose names are a household word; and there are others of whom the general public knows little or nothing, and who have yet equally the quality of greatness. Of such was Paul Emrys-Evans."

After losing his seat in Parliament Emrys-Evans joined the board of the British South Africa Company, ultimately becoming its President.

Emrys-Evans died in Nice in 1967. A memorial service was held at the Church of St Martin-in-the-Fields on 23 November 1967, led by the Reverend Austen Williams, with the Bishop of Worcester giving an address.

Emrys-Evans's papers are housed at the British Library.

Parliament of the United Kingdom
Preceded by David Graham Pole	Member of Parliament for South Derbyshire; 1931–1945	Succeeded by Arthur Champion
Political offices
Preceded by Geoffrey Hithersay Shakespeare	Under-Secretary of State for Dominion Affairs; 1942–1945	Succeeded by John Parker
