= 1955 Edinburgh North by-election =

UK parliamentary by-election

The 1955 Edinburgh North by-election was held on 27 January 1955. It was held because the Unionist MP, James Clyde, resigned when he was appointed Lord President of the Court of Session. It was held by the Unionist candidate, William Rankine Milligan. Milligan's vote share was slightly higher than Clyde had achieved at the previous general election, although the victorious candidate was disappointed at the low turnout which he said could not be entirely attributed to bad weather. The defeated Labour candidate, who was chairman of the Burntisland Labour Party, argued the result was not a vote of confidence in the government. Some of the 41 spoiled ballot papers were reported to have had slogans written on them by Scottish nationalists.

== Result ==
By-election 1955: Edinburgh North
Party	Candidate	Votes	%	±%
Unionist	William Rankine Milligan	11,413	59.41	+0.62
Labour	G Scott	7,799	40.59	−0.62
Majority		3,614	18.82	+1.24
Turnout		19,212		
Unionist hold		Swing		
