= Harold Boardman =

British politician

Harold Boardman

Harold Boardman (12 June 1907 – 1 August 1994) was a British Labour Party politician.

Born in Bolton, Boardman moved to Derby in his youth. He worked as an official of the Union of Shop, Distributive and Allied Workers and was a member of Derby Town Council for 25 years. He was chairman of the Derby Co-operative Movement and of Derby Labour College.

Boardman was Member of Parliament for Leigh from 1945 to 1979, preceding Lawrence Cunliffe.

Parliament of the United Kingdom
Preceded by John Joseph Tinker	Member of Parliament for Leigh; 1945–1979	Succeeded by Lawrence Cunliffe
