= 1920 Edinburgh North by-election =

UK parliamentary by-election

- 9 April 1920 (Polling); 22 April 1920 (Declaration)
- Registered: 35,663
- Turnout: 62.3%

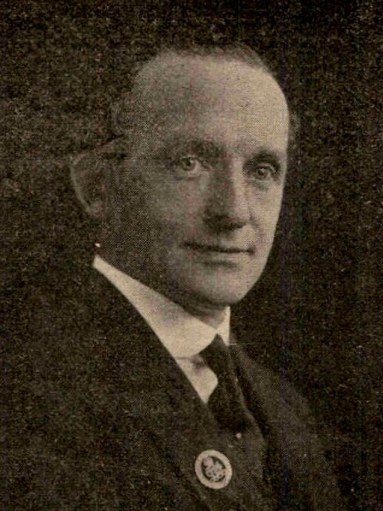
Candidate	Patrick Ford	Walter Runciman	David Pole
Party	Unionist	Liberal	Labour
Alliance	Coalition
Popular vote	9,944	8,469	3,808
Percentage	44.8%	38.1%	17.1%
Swing	▼18.2%	▲1.1%	New
MP before election
James Clyde
Unionist
Subsequent MP
Patrick Ford
Unionist

The 1920 Edinburgh North by-election was held on 9 April 1920. The by-election was held due to the resignation of the incumbent Coalition Conservative MP, James Avon Clyde after he was appointed to the bench as Lord Justice General and Lord President of the Court of Session. It was won by the Coalition Conservative candidate Patrick Ford

== Background ==
James Avon Clyde had held Edinburgh North since it was formed from Edinburgh East for the 1918 election and previously had held Edinburgh West since 1909.

== Candidates ==
=== Unionist ===
- Patrick Ford, advocate, candidate for Edinburgh East in 1909 & January 1910 and Inverness Burghs in 1918.

=== Liberal ===
- Walter Runciman, President of the Board of Trade (1914–1916), President of the Board of Agriculture (1911–1914), President of the Board of Education (1908–1911), member for Oldham (1899–1900) and for Dewsbury (1902–1918)

=== Labour ===
- David Pole, solicitor and candidate for East Grinstead in 1918

The original Labour candidate was James Maxton, a Glasgow school teacher and candidate for Glasgow Bridgeton in 1918, however he would be replaced by Pole.

=== Coalition Liberal ===
There were initial suggestions that the Coalition Liberals were planning on running former Lord Provost of Edinburgh John MacLeod as their candidate, however they opted to back the Unionists.

== Result ==
Edinburgh North by-election, 1920
Party		Candidate	Votes	%	±%
C	Unionist	Patrick Ford	9,944	44.8	–18.2
	Liberal	Walter Runciman	8,469	38.1	+1.1
	Labour	David Pole	3,808	17.1	New
Majority			1,475	6.7	–19.3
Turnout			22,221	62.3	+9.3
Registered electors			35,663		
	Unionist hold		Swing	–9.7	
C indicates candidate endorsed by the coalition government.

== Aftermath ==
All three candidates would end up in Parliament with Runciman winning Swansea West in 1924 and Pole winning South Derbyshire in 1929.
