= Edinburgh North (UK Parliament constituency) =

Former parliamentary constituency in the United Kingdom

- Former burgh constituency for the House of Commons
- Major settlements: Edinburgh

1918–1983
- Seats: One
- Created from: Edinburgh Central, Edinburgh West and Leith Burghs
- Replaced by: Edinburgh Central, Edinburgh Leith, Edinburgh East and Edinburgh West

Edinburgh North was a burgh constituency of the House of Commons of the Parliament of the United Kingdom from 1918 to 1983. It elected one Member of Parliament (MP), using the first-past-the-post voting system.

== Boundaries ==
1918–1950: The Broughton, Calton, St. Andrew's and St. Stephen's wards of the county of the city of Edinburgh.

1950–1955: The Broughton, Calton and St. Andrew's wards of the county of the city of Edinburgh.

1955–1974: The Broughton, Calton and St. Andrew's wards of the county of the city of Edinburgh, and part of the St. Bernard's ward.

1974–1983: The Broughton, Calton, St. Andrew's and St. Bernard's wards of the county of the city of Edinburgh.

== Members of Parliament ==
Year	Member	Party
1918	James Avon Clyde	Unionist
1920 by-election	Patrick Ford	Unionist
1923	Peter Raffan	Liberal
1924	Sir Patrick Ford	Unionist
1935	Alexander Erskine-Hill	Unionist
1945	George Willis	Labour
1950	James Latham Clyde	Unionist
1955 by-election	William Milligan	Unionist
1960 by-election	Lord Dalkeith	Unionist
1965	Lord Dalkeith	Conservative
1973 by-election	Alexander Fletcher	Conservative
1983	constituency abolished	

== Election results ==
=== Elections in the 1910s ===
General election 1918: Edinburgh North
Party		Candidate	Votes	%	±%
C	Unionist	Rt Hon. James Avon Clyde	11,879	63.0	
	Liberal	James Johnston	6,986	37.0	
Majority			4,893	26.0	
Turnout			18,865	53.0	
	Unionist win				
C indicates candidate endorsed by the coalition government.

=== Elections in the 1920s ===
Runciman

1920 Edinburgh North by-election
Party	Candidate	Votes	%	±%
Unionist	Patrick Johnstone Ford	9,944	44.8	−18.2
Liberal	Rt Hon. Walter Runciman	8,469	38.1	+1.1
Labour	David Graham Pole	3,808	17.1	New
Majority		1,475	6.7	−19.3
Turnout		22,221	62.3	+9.3
Unionist hold		Swing	-9.7	

General election 1922: Edinburgh North
Party	Candidate	Votes	%	±%
Unionist	Patrick Johnstone Ford	14,805	61.8	+17.0
Liberal	P. H. Allan	9,165	38.2	+0.1
Majority		5,640	23.6	+16.9
Turnout		23,970		
Unionist hold		Swing	+8.4	

General election 1923: Edinburgh North
Party	Candidate	Votes	%	±%
Liberal	Peter Wilson Raffan	13,744	55.7	+17.5
Unionist	Patrick Johnstone Ford	10,909	44.3	−17.5
Majority		2,835	11.4	N/A
Turnout		24,653	66.3	
Liberal gain from Unionist		Swing	+17.5	

Stewart

General election 1924: Edinburgh North
Party	Candidate	Votes	%	±%
Unionist	Patrick Johnstone Ford	14,461	49.3	+5.0
Labour	Eleanor Stewart	8,192	27.9	New
Liberal	Peter Wilson Raffan	6,669	22.7	−33.0
Majority		6,269	21.4	N/A
Turnout		29,322	78.0	+11.7
Unionist gain from Liberal		Swing		

General election 1929: Edinburgh North
Party	Candidate	Votes	%	±%
Unionist	Sir Patrick Johnstone Ford	13,993	39.7	−9.6
Labour	Eleanor Stewart	11,340	32.2	+4.3
Liberal	William Mitchell	9,877	28.1	+5.4
Majority		2,653	7.5	−13.9
Turnout		35,210	73.8	−4.2
Unionist hold		Swing	-6.9	

=== Elections in the 1930s ===
General election 1931: Edinburgh North
Party	Candidate	Votes	%	±%
Unionist	Sir Patrick Johnstone Ford	26,361	75.03	+35.3
Labour	Robert Gibson	8,771	24.97	−7.2
Majority		17,590	50.06	+42.5
Turnout		35,132	74.38	+0.60
Registered electors		47,234		
Unionist hold		Swing	+19.05	

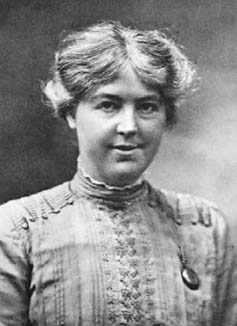
Chrystal Macmillan

General election 1935: Edinburgh North
Party	Candidate	Votes	%	±%
Unionist	Alexander Galloway Erskine Erskine-Hill	20,776	66.53	−8.50
Labour	Gerald Walker Crawford	8,654	27.71	+2.74
Liberal	Jessie Chrystal Macmillan	1,798	5.76	New
Majority		12,122	38.82	−11.26
Turnout		31,228	66.75	−7.63
Registered electors		46,786		
Unionist hold		Swing	-5.62	

=== Elections in the 1940s ===
General Election 1939–40:

Another General Election was required to take place before the end of 1940. The political parties had been making preparations for an election to take place from 1939 and by the end of this year, the following candidates had been selected;

- Unionist: Alexander Erskine-Hill
- Labour: Gerald Walker Crawford

General election 1945: Edinburgh North
Party	Candidate	Votes	%	±%
Labour	Eustace George Willis	12,825	45.10	+17.39
Unionist	Sir Alexander Galloway Erskine Erskine-Hill	12,270	43.14	−23.39
Liberal	Charles Hampton Johnston	3,344	11.76	+6.00
Majority		555	1.96	N/A
Turnout		28,439	64.75	−2.00
Registered electors		43,921		
Labour gain from Unionist		Swing	+20.39	

=== Elections in the 1950s ===
General election 1950: Edinburgh North
Party	Candidate	Votes	%	±%
Unionist	James Latham McDiarmid Clyde	17,826	51.21	+8.07
Labour	Eustace George Willis	13,683	39.31	−5.79
Liberal	Iain Padruig Crawford	3,303	9.49	−2.27
Majority		4,143	11.90	N/A
Turnout		34,812	78.71	+13.96
Registered electors		44,226		
Unionist gain from Labour		Swing	+6.93	

General election 1951: Edinburgh North
Party	Candidate	Votes	%	±%
Unionist	James Latham McDiarmid Clyde	20,836	58.79	+7.58
Labour	Eustace George Willis	14,604	41.21	+1.90
Majority		6,232	17.58	+5.68
Turnout		35,440	80.01	+1.30
Registered electors		44,294		
Unionist hold		Swing	+2.84	

1955 Edinburgh North by-election
Party	Candidate	Votes	%	±%
Unionist	William Rankine Milligan	11,413	59.41	+0.62
Labour	George Scott	7,799	40.59	−0.62
Majority		3,614	18.82	+1.24
Turnout		19,212		
Unionist hold		Swing		

General election 1955: Edinburgh North
Party	Candidate	Votes	%	±%
Unionist	William Rankine Milligan	20,425	61.73	+2.94
Labour	George Scott	12,664	38.27	−2.94
Majority		7,761	23.46	+5.88
Turnout		33,089	72.01	−8.00
Registered electors		45,952		
Unionist hold		Swing	+2.94	

General election 1959: Edinburgh North
Party	Candidate	Votes	%	±%
Unionist	William Rankine Milligan	19,991	64.02	+2.29
Labour	George Gordon Stott	11,235	35.98	−2.29
Majority		8,756	28.04	+4.59
Turnout		31,226	73.87	+1.86
Registered electors		42,270		
Unionist hold		Swing	+2.29	

=== Elections in the 1960s ===
1960 Edinburgh North by-election
Party	Candidate	Votes	%	±%
Unionist	Walter Francis John Montagu Douglas Scott, Lord Dalkeith	12,109	54.20	−9.82
Labour	Ronald King Murray	6,775	30.32	−5.66
Liberal	Richard McPake	3,458	15.50	New
Majority		5,334	23.87	−4.17
Turnout		22,342	53.10	−20.77
Unionist hold		Swing	-2.05	

General election 1964: Edinburgh North
Party	Candidate	Votes	%	±%
Unionist	Walter Francis John Montagu Douglas Scott, Lord Dalkeith	17,094	58.23	−5.79
Labour	Alexander D Reid	12,264	41.77	+5.79
Majority		4,830	16.46	−11.58
Turnout		29,358	73.60	−0.27
Registered electors		39,888		
Unionist hold		Swing	-5.79	

General election 1966: Edinburgh North
Party	Candidate	Votes	%	±%
Conservative	Walter Francis John Montagu Douglas Scott, Lord Dalkeith	13,765	50.30	−7.93
Labour	Walter Dalgleish	10,730	39.21	−2.56
Liberal	Lawrence Oliver	2,871	10.49	New
Majority		3,035	11.09	−5.36
Turnout		27,366	73.85	+0.25
Registered electors		37,056		
Conservative hold		Swing	-2.69	

=== Elections in the 1970s ===
General election 1970: Edinburgh North
Party	Candidate	Votes	%	±%
Conservative	Walter Douglas–Scott	13,005	52.85	+2.55
Labour	Robin Cook	9,127	37.09	−2.12
Liberal	C Alistair Dow	2,475	10.06	−0.43
Majority		3,878	15.76	+4.67
Turnout		24,607	70.05	−3.80
Registered electors		35,128		
Conservative hold		Swing	+2.34	

1973 Edinburgh North by-election
Party	Candidate	Votes	%	±%
Conservative	Alexander Fletcher	7,208	38.69	−14.16
Labour	Robert Cairns	4,467	23.98	−13.11
SNP	William Wolfe	3,526	19.11	New
Liberal	Ronald Guild	3,431	18.42	+8.36
Majority		2,741	14.71	−1.05
Turnout		18,632		
Registered electors		35,128		
Conservative hold		Swing		

1970 notional result
Party	Vote	%
Conservative	19,300	55.46
Labour	12,200	35.06
Liberal	3,300	9.48
Turnout	34,800	71.19
Electorate	48,884	

General election February 1974: Edinburgh North
Party	Candidate	Votes	%	±%
Conservative	Alexander Fletcher	16,417	45.78	–9.68
Labour	Robert Cairns	9,404	26.23	–8.83
Liberal	Ronald Guild	5,487	15.30	+5.82
SNP	James Lynch	4,550	12.69	N/A
Majority		7,013	19.56	+3.80
Turnout		35,858	76.40	+5.21
Registered electors		46,936		–1,948
Conservative hold		Swing	–0.42	

General election October 1974: Edinburgh North
Party	Candidate	Votes	%	±%
Conservative	Alexander Fletcher	12,856	39.34	–6.44
Labour	Martin O'Neill	8,465	25.90	–0.32
SNP	James Lynch	7,681	23.50	+10.82
Liberal	Murdoch MacDonald	3,677	11.25	–4.05
Majority		4,391	13.44	–6.12
Turnout		32,679	69.21	–7.19
Registered electors		47,215		
Conservative hold		Swing	–3.06	

General election 1979: Edinburgh North
Party	Candidate	Votes	%	±%
Conservative	Alexander Fletcher	14,170	43.59	+4.25
Labour	Neil Lindsay	9,773	30.06	+4.16
Liberal	Ronald Guild	5,045	15.52	+4.27
SNP	Neil MacCormick	3,521	10.83	–12.67
Majority		4,397	13.53	+0.09
Turnout		32,509	71.76	+2.55
Registered electors		45,303		
Conservative hold		Swing	+0.04	
