= David Pole (politician) =

British lawyer and Labour Party politician

David Graham Pole
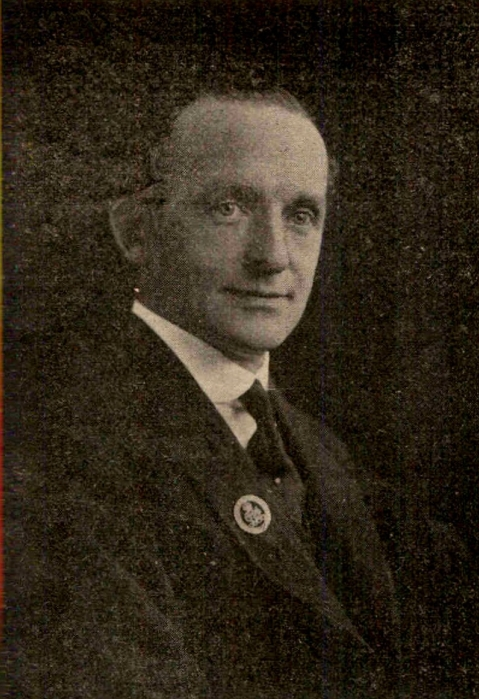

Member of Parliament for South Derbyshire
- In office 1929–1931
- Preceded by: James Augustus Grant
- Succeeded by: Paul Emrys-Evans

Personal details
- Born: December 11, 1877
- Died: November 26, 1952 (aged 74) Marylebone, England
- Party: Labour
- Occupation: Lawyer, Politician

David Graham Pole (11 December 1877 – 26 November 1952) was a British lawyer and Labour Party politician who served as Member of Parliament (MP) for South Derbyshire from 1929 to 1931. His parents were John Pole, a ship's captain, and Rossina Graham, both from Shetland.

== Political career ==
Pole was an unsuccessful candidate at four times: in East Grinstead at the 1918 general election; at the Edinburgh North by-election in 1920; in Cardiff South 1922 general election; and in Cardiff Central 1924 general election.

He was elected as Member of Parliament (MP) for South Derbyshire at the 1929 general election, but was defeated at the 1931 general election by the Conservative Party candidate Paul Emrys-Evans. Pole did not stand for Parliament again, and died in Marylebone aged 74.

== Theosophy ==
Pole was an activist for both the Fabian Society and the Theosophical Society. As such he defended Annie Besant's taking and retention of Jiddu Krishnamurti and his brother Nityananda from their Indian magistrate father.

Pole edited a Theosophical publication Theosophy in Scotland among his many Theosophical endeavors.

Parliament of the United Kingdom
Preceded by James Augustus Grant	Member of Parliament for South Derbyshire; 1929–1931	Succeeded by Paul Emrys-Evans
