= James Millikin Bevans =

United States Air Force general

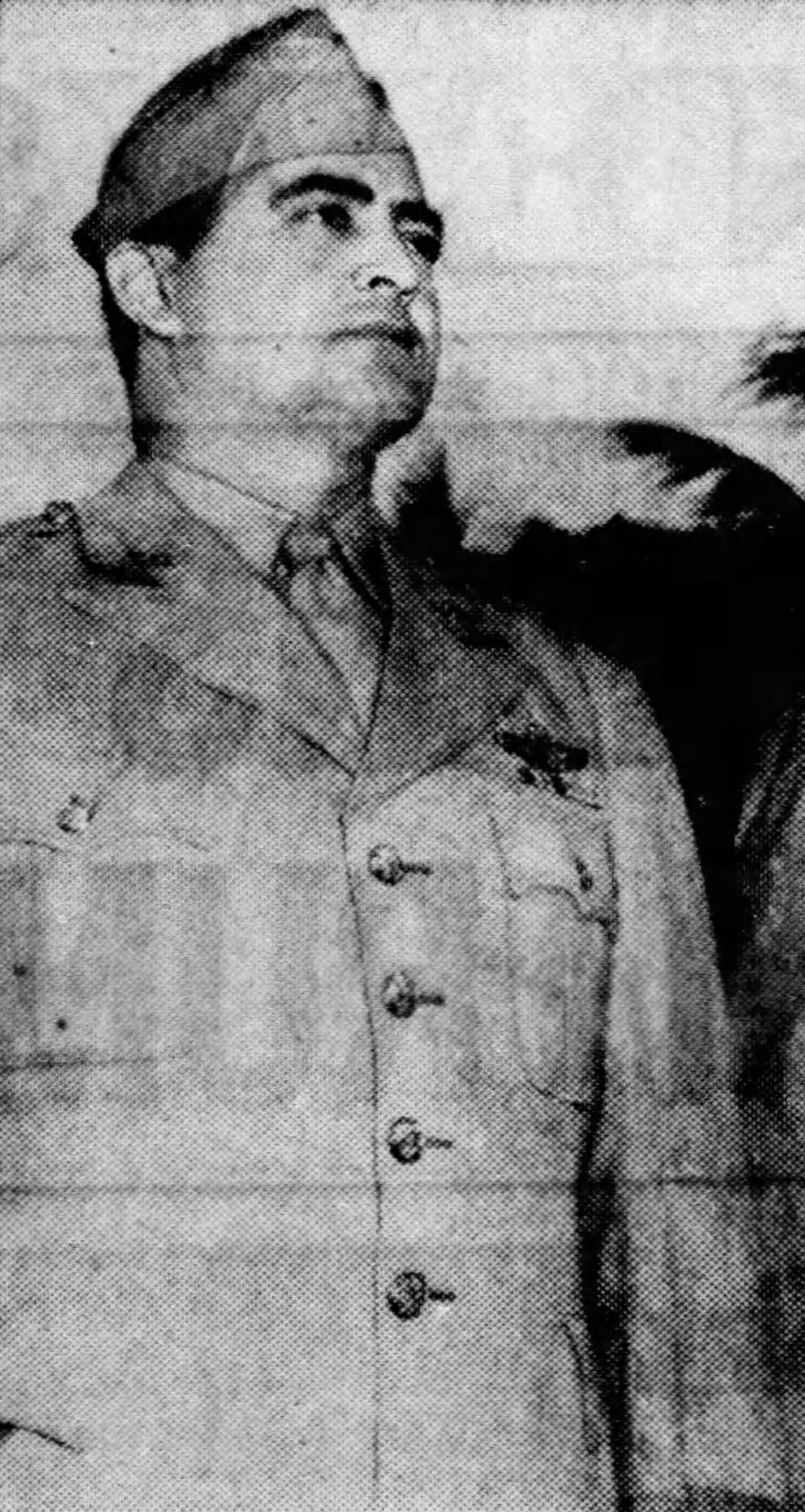
Bevans in 1944

James Millikin Bevans (October 12, 1899 – May 1, 1977) was a major general in the United States Air Force.

== Biography ==
Bevans was born in San Francisco, California, in 1899. His parents were United States Army Colonel James Lung Bevans of Platteville, Wisconsin, and Dessie Millikin Bevans of Decatur, Illinois. Their graves are adjacent to each other at Arlington National Cemetery. He married Lorna Downs, who died in 1999. Bevans died on May 1, 1977.

== Career ==
Bevans entered the United States Military Academy in 1917, but did not graduate. However, he enlisted in the Student Army Training Corps at Princeton University. Bevans completed his officer training at Camp Lee and be commissioned a second lieutenant in the Army. In 1922 Bevans graduated from the United States Army Field Artillery School. Bevans became professor of military science and tactics at Iowa State College in October 1924. In 1927 Bevans was transferred to the United States Army Air Corps and assigned to March Field. Bevans was assigned to serve at France Field in 1930 and became its adjutant in 1931. In 1937 Bevans graduated from the Air Corps Tactical School. The following year he graduated from the United States Army Command and General Staff College and be assigned as the adjutant of Mitchel Field. In 1940 he was named assistant executive officer in the Office of the Chief of the Air Corps. He was named chief of the enlisted section of the Military Personnel in June 1941 and chief of the officer's section in October of the same year. Bevans served as assistant for personnel from January to March 1942, when he was appointed director of personnel of the United States Army Air Forces Headquarters. Soon after he was named assistant chief of air staff. He was appointed as deputy for administration of the U.S. Army Forces in the Mediterranean Theater of Operations in February 1945. In June of the same year he was named commanding general of the Air Force in the Mediterranean Theater. That August he became assistant chief of staff for personnel of the U.S. Forces in Europe. In 1947 he became director of personnel and administration of the U.S. Forces in Europe. He was named chief of personnel and administration of Air Material Command in 1948.

Awards he received include the Distinguished Service Medal, the Legion of Merit, and the Bronze Star Medal.

== Assignment history ==
- 1940 – Assistant executive officer, Office of the Chief of Air Corps
- 1941 – Chief of enlisted section, Military Personnel Division, Headquarters US Army Air Forces
- 1941 – Chief of officers' section, Military Personnel Division, Headquarters US Army Air Forces
- 1942 – Assistant chief of personnel division, Headquarters US Army Air Forces
- 1942 – Director of personnel, Headquarters US Army Air Forces
- 1942 – Assistant chief of staff for personnel, Headquarters US Army Air Forces
- 1945 – Deputy commanding general for administration, Mediterranean Theater of Operations US Army
- 1945 – Commanding general of Army Air Forces Mediterranean
- 1945 – Assistant chief of staff for personnel, US Forces in Europe
- 1947 – Director of personnel & administration, European Command
- 1947 – Attached to Headquarters US Air Force
- 1948 – Chief of personnel & administration, Air Material Command
- 1951 – Retired
