= Nathaniel Dunlop =

19th-century British businessman

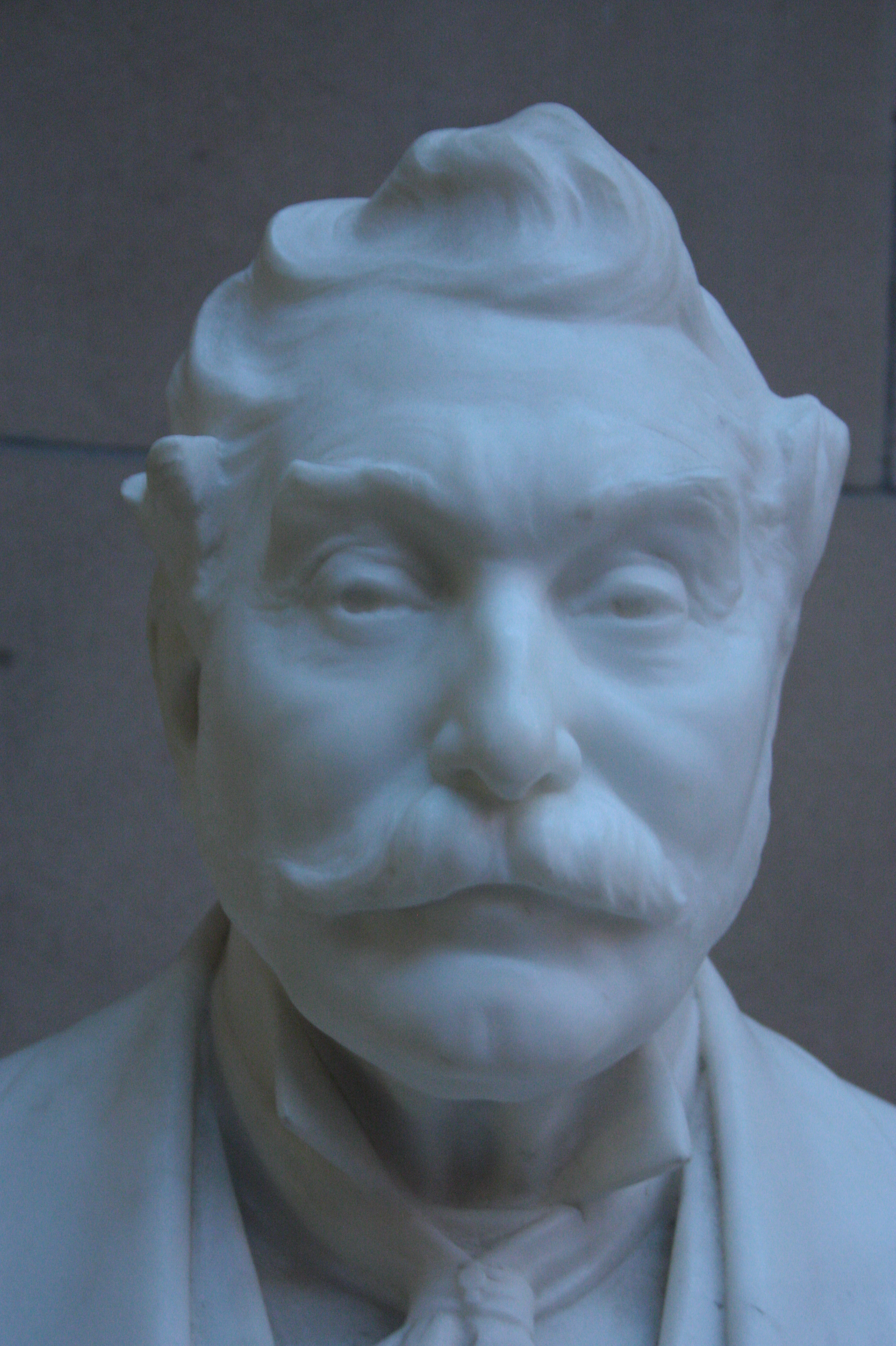
Sir Nathaniel Dunlop by George Frampton 1913, Kelvingrove Art Gallery and Museum

Sir Nathaniel Dunlop (1830–1919) was a 19th-century British businessman, shipowner and philanthropist, linked to the Allan Steamship Line. He was the longest serving Chairman of the Clyde Navigation Trust. He was also the first Scottish Chairman of the Chamber of Shipping of the United Kingdom.

== Life ==
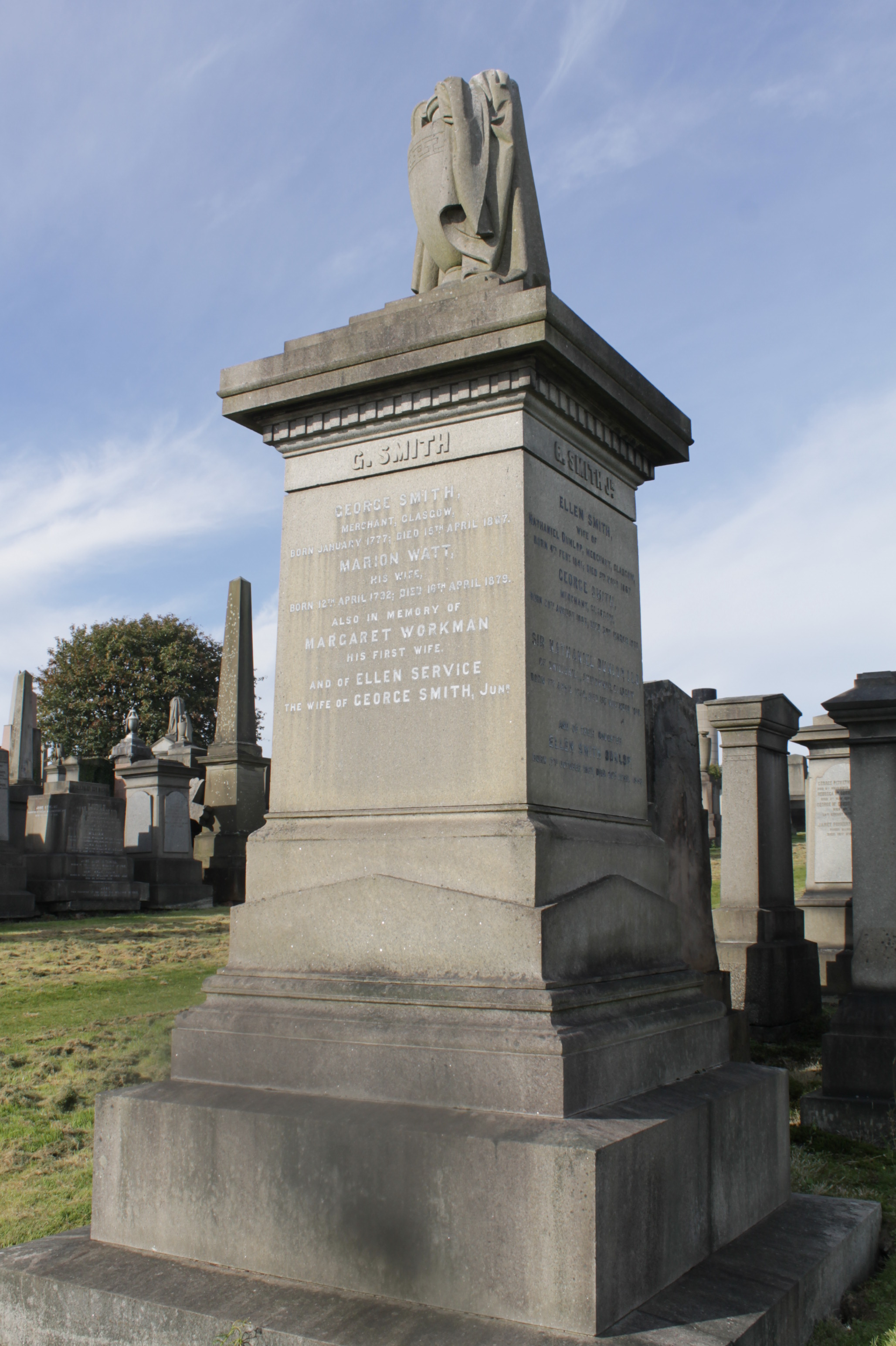
The grave of Nathaniel Dunlop, Glasgow Necropolis

He was born in Campbeltown on 7 April 1830, the son of Archibald Dunlop and his wife Jean Smith. He was educated in the grammar school there.

He moved to Paisley in 1843, and around 1845 he moved to Glasgow to work as a clerk for Allan Line. He became a manager in 1853. The most famous ship built under his control was SS Canadian. In Glasgow he lived at 1 Montgomerie Crescent in the Kelvinside district.

In 1898 he bought the estate of Shieldhill near Biggar. He was knighted Sir Nathaniel Dunlop of Shieldhill in 1907 by King Edward VII. Glasgow University awarded him an honorary doctorate (LLD) in the same year. He did much philanthropic work in Biggar and paid for the church in Quothquan.

He died on 15 November 1919 at Shieldhill. He is buried with his in-laws in the Glasgow Necropolis. The large monument stands near the summit north of the main east-west path.

== Family ==
He was married to Ellen Smith (1841–1867), daughter of George Smith (1777–1867), a major Glasgow shipowner. Ellen died at the birth of their only child, a daughter, Ellen Smith Dunlop (1867–1958), who continued his philanthropic work after his death.

== Publications ==
- The Canadian Trade as It Was and Is (1906)
