= James Milligan, Lord Milligan =

Scottish lawyer and judge

James George Milligan, Lord Milligan, PC (10 May 1934 – 7 March 2005) was a Scottish lawyer and judge. He was a Senator of the College of Justice from 1988 to 2001.

He was the son of William Milligan, Lord Milligan.
