= Quothquan =

Coordinates: 55°38′19″N 3°35′59″W

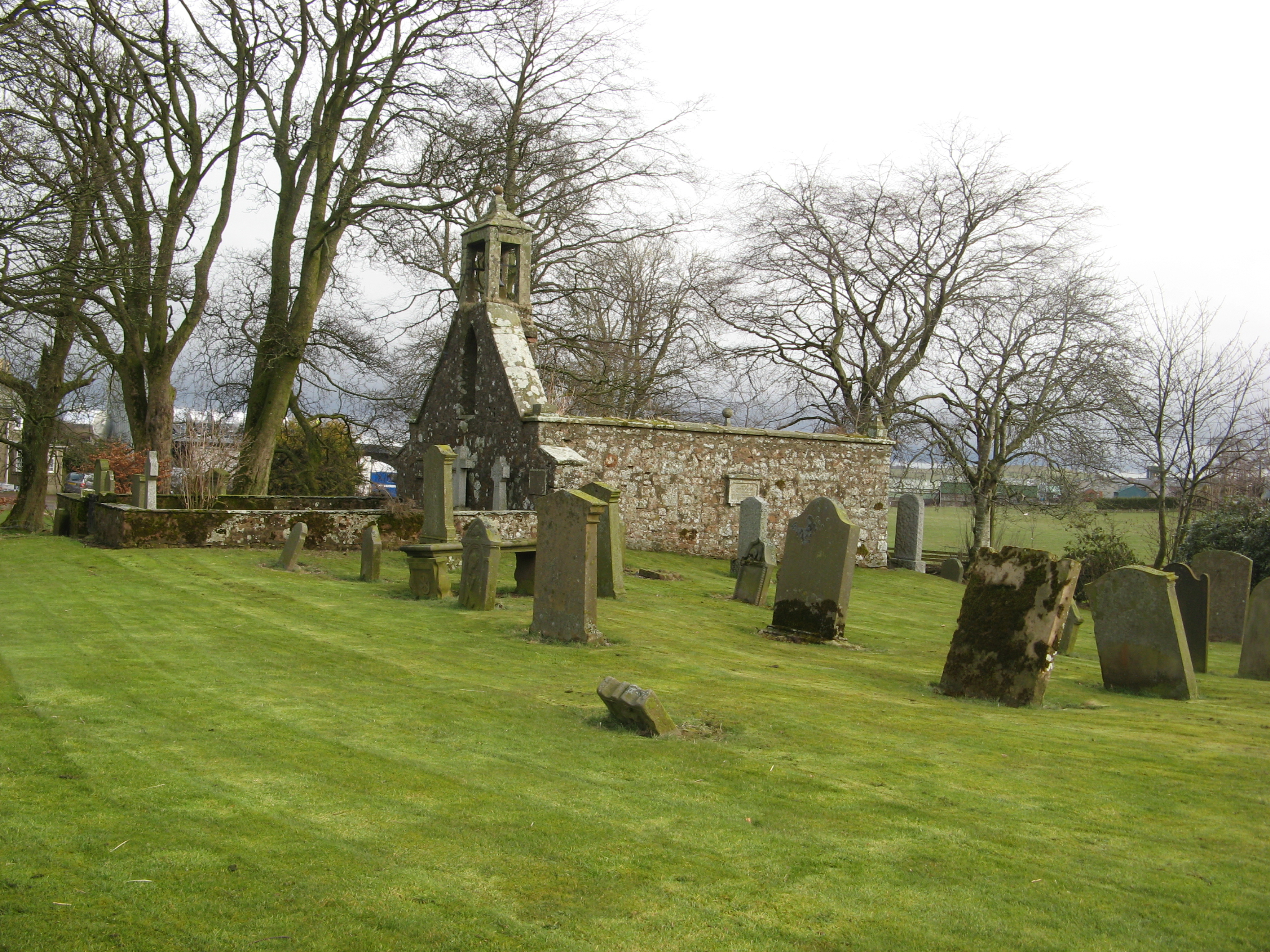
- The ruined church at Quothquan

- Location within South Lanarkshire
- OS grid reference: NS994395
- Civil parish: Biggar
- Council area: South Lanarkshire
- Lieutenancy area: Lanarkshire
- Country: Scotland
- Sovereign state: United Kingdom
- Post town: BIGGAR
- Postcode district: ML12
- Police: Scotland
- Fire: Scottish
- Ambulance: Scottish
- UK Parliament: Dumfriesshire, Clydesdale and Tweeddale
- Scottish Parliament: Clydesdale
- Website: Quothquan village website

Quothquan (also formerly spelled Couth-Boan, meaning "the beautiful hill"; Scottish Gaelic: A’ Choitcheann, pronounced [ə ˈxɔʰtʲçən̪ˠ], meaning "the common") is a village in Libberton parish, South Lanarkshire, Scotland. It is 3 1/4 miles (5.2 km) northwest of Biggar, and 7 1/2 miles (12.1 km) southeast of Lanark.

To the southwest is the 1,098-foot-high (335 m) hill Quothquan Law, topped by the remains of a hill fort. The hill comprises two elements, one is an enclosure to the southeast which is around 400 by 230 feet (120 by 70 m). The other is a lower larger annexe to the northwest, with double ramparts and a medial ditch which has mostly been filled in.

== Community facilities ==
Quothquan has a village hall near the remains of the graveyard and the ruins of a small church. The original church was recorded in use as a schoolroom after 1724. A new church in the village was paid for in 1903 by Glasgow shipowner Sir Nathaniel Dunlop, who lived nearby.
