= Cartography of Scotland =

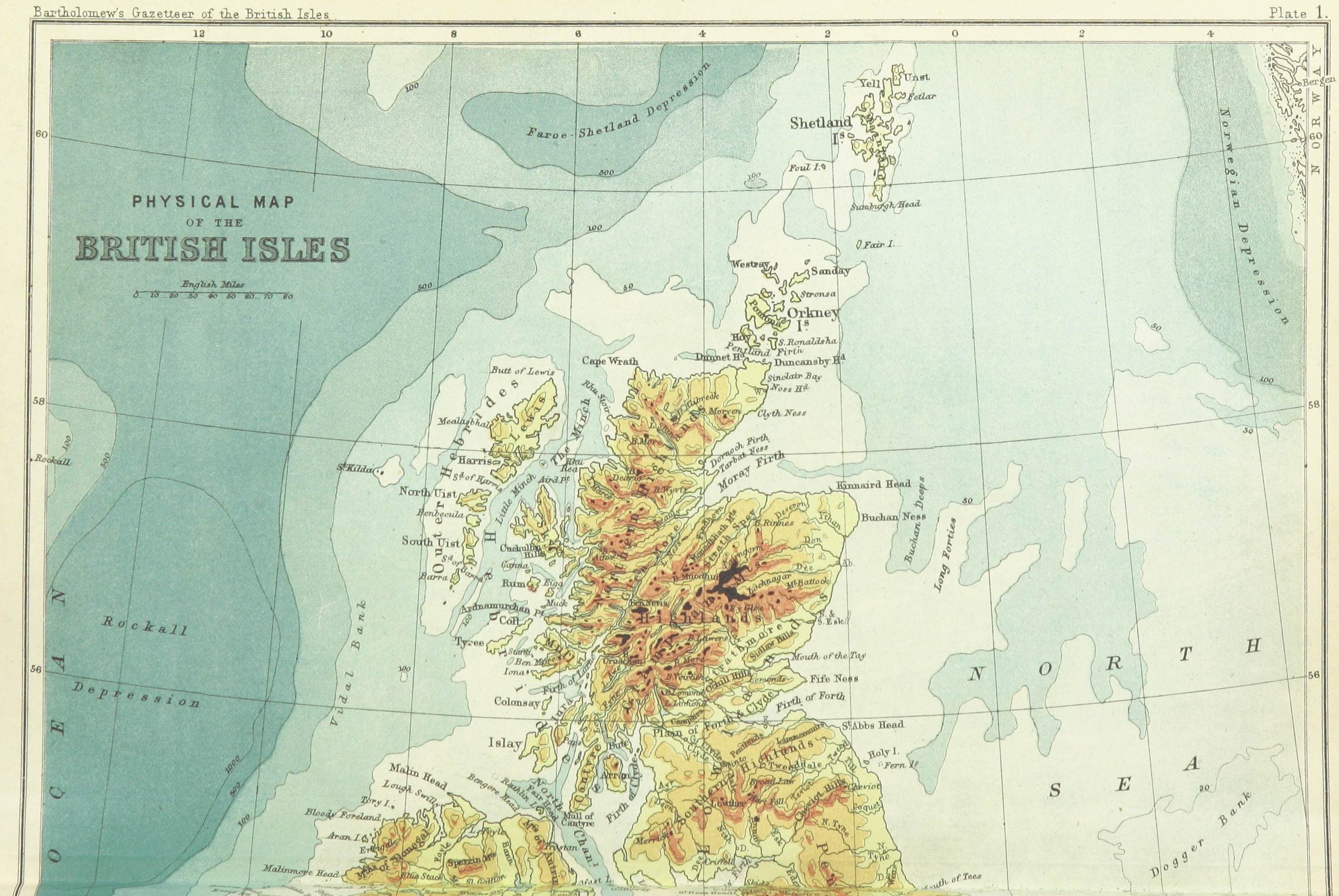
1928 topographic map of Scotland by Edinburgh cartographers John Bartholomew and Son

The cartography of Scotland is the history of surveying and creation of maps of Scotland. The earliest known depiction of the country in map form is that of Ptolemy, dated to the second century CE. Surviving maps from the medieval era provide very little additional information and it is not until the mid-16th century that maps of Scotland show genuine improvement.

An atlas produced by Joan Blaeu based on Timothy Pont's surveys of the late 16th century and early 17th century has been described as "one of Scotland's... greatest cartographic treasures" and this outline continued to provide the basis for many 'new' maps until the end of the 18th century. More detailed map-making, primarily for military purposes, followed in the wake of Jacobite rising of 1745. In time the work of William Roy (1726–1790) led to the creation of the Ordnance Survey and the era of modern cartography with its diverse functions.

== Ptolemy ==
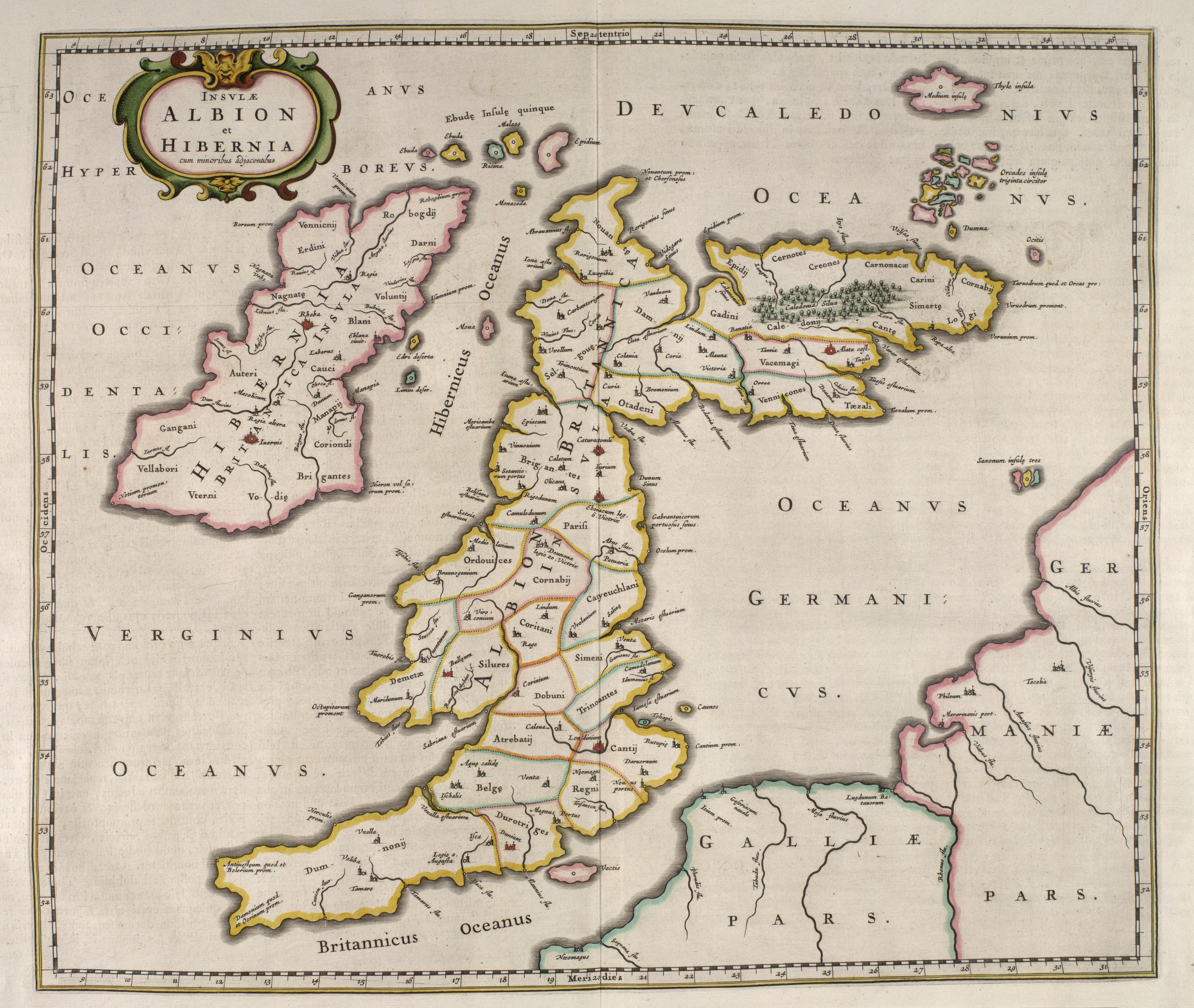
Ptolemy's map of Insulae Albian et Hibernia (i.e. Great Britain and Ireland) as reproduced in Blaeu's 1654 Atlas Novus.

There are early written references to the geography of Scotland. For example, Pytheas of Massilia visited Britain – probably sometime between 322 and 285 BC – and described it as triangular in shape, with a northern tip called Orcas. This may have referred to Dunnet Head on mainland Scotland, from which Orkney is visible. Tacitus wrote of his father-in-law Agricola's expedition into what is now Scotland in the first century CE and both Pomponius Mela and Pliny the Elder had previously referred to the islands surrounding Scotland.

However, the earliest known map that has survived into the modern era is that of the Hellenistic geographer Claudius Ptolemaeus better known as Ptolemy (90–168) who produced a detailed eight-volume record, the Geographike Hyphegesis known as the Geography. (Note: Ptolemy's Geography was rediscovered in Constantinople in 1295 and arrived in western Europe in 1397.) In the third part of the Geography, Ptolemy gives instructions on how to create maps both of the whole inhabited world (oikoumenē) and of the Roman provinces, including the necessary topographic lists, and captions for the maps. His oikoumenē spanned 180 degrees of longitude from the Blessed Islands in the Atlantic Ocean to the middle of China, and about 80 degrees of latitude from Shetland to Tanzania on the east coast of Africa.

Ptolemy's depiction of Scotland shows the country "turned on its side" so that the west coast is shown at the top and the east coast is in the southern position. The outlying islands of the Hebrides, Orkney and Shetland are simply scattered around what appears to be the north coast and there are few other details. Individual Hebridean islands are listed under Ireland. Islay is Ptolemy's Epidion, Malaios is Mull and his Scetis is presumed to be Skye. Some settlements and Roman forts are mentioned on the mainland and a large forest is drawn at the centre. The outline of the east coast has an approxmation to reality (albeit shown to the south) but the other coastlines are evidently guesswork. Breeze (2002) quotes J.J. Tierney who believed that Ptolemy's information about Scotland "was extremely poor" and certainly the paucity of information included about Scotland, particularly north of the Great Glen, is in contrast to the relative detail afforded for the island of Ireland. (Note: Ptolemy's data for the Mediterranean basin exhibits a "high level of precision" which the peripeheral regions "are almost entirely devoid of".)

Nonetheless, this misshapen outline, which was created before Scotland even existed as a polity, stood largely uncorrected for about fourteen centuries.

== Medieval period ==
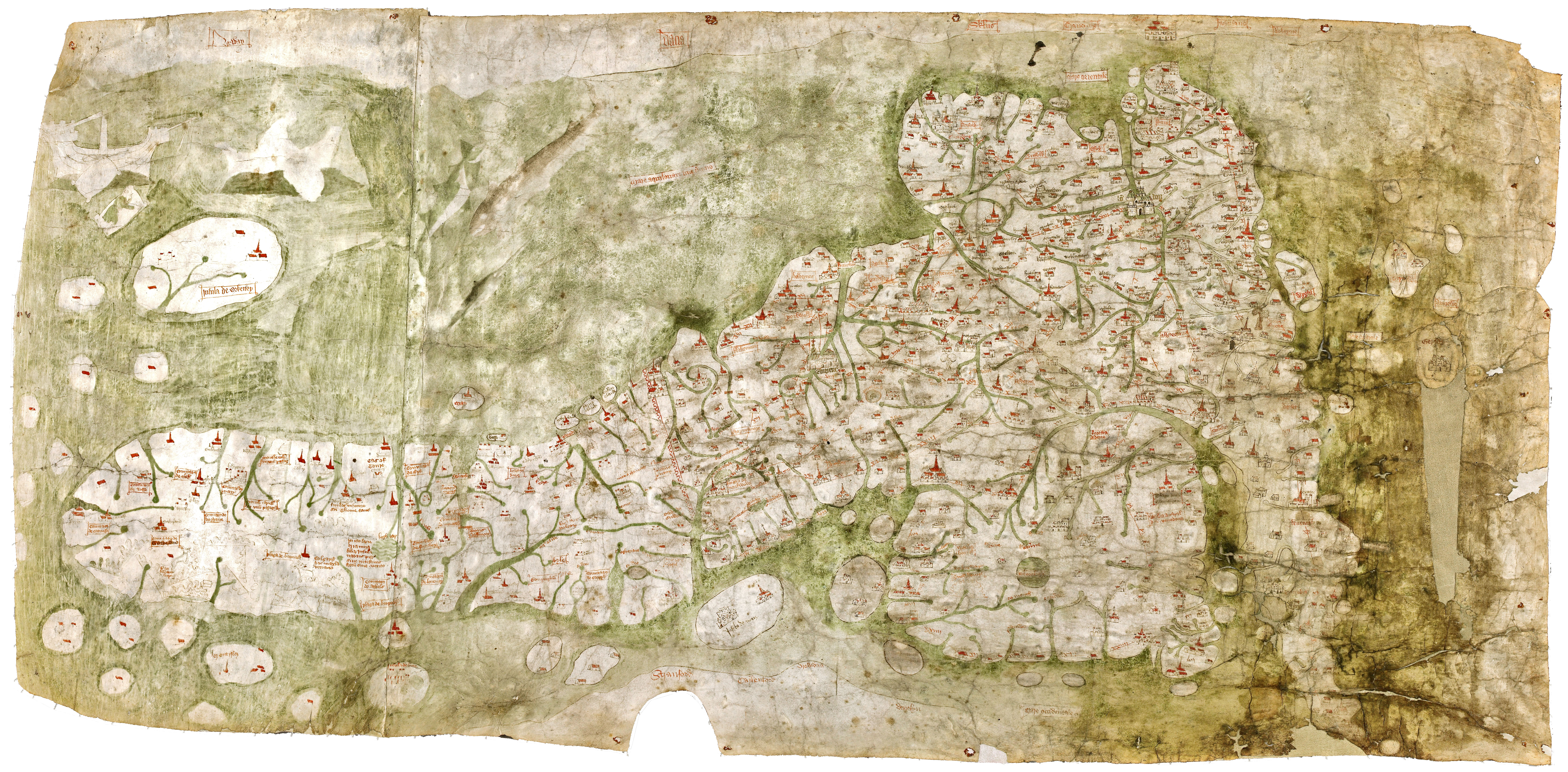
The 14th century Gough Map - north lies to the left.

There is very little evidence of new maps of Scotland or of Scottish map-making until the mid-sixteenth century. The country figures in surviving examples of various early Christian world maps and in portolan charts but where it is shown it is "indistinct and always marginal". An example is the Anglo-Saxon or Cotton map - an 11th-century Mappa mundi. Scotland appears as an imprecise mainland with scattered islands. Similarly, Scotland has a "barely recognizable" shape and very little detail in a 13th-century Matthew Paris map of Britain. Scotland is similarly lacking in comparison to England in the 1360 Gough Map of Great Britain. It is possible that the map was created to aid Edward I of England's military adventures in Scotland and almost nothing is shown for the area north of the Moray Firth. The English chronicler John Hardyng spent some considerable time in Scotland but his 1457 map of the country is highly stylised and probably created with the aim of persuading Henry VI of England to invade.

== 16th century ==
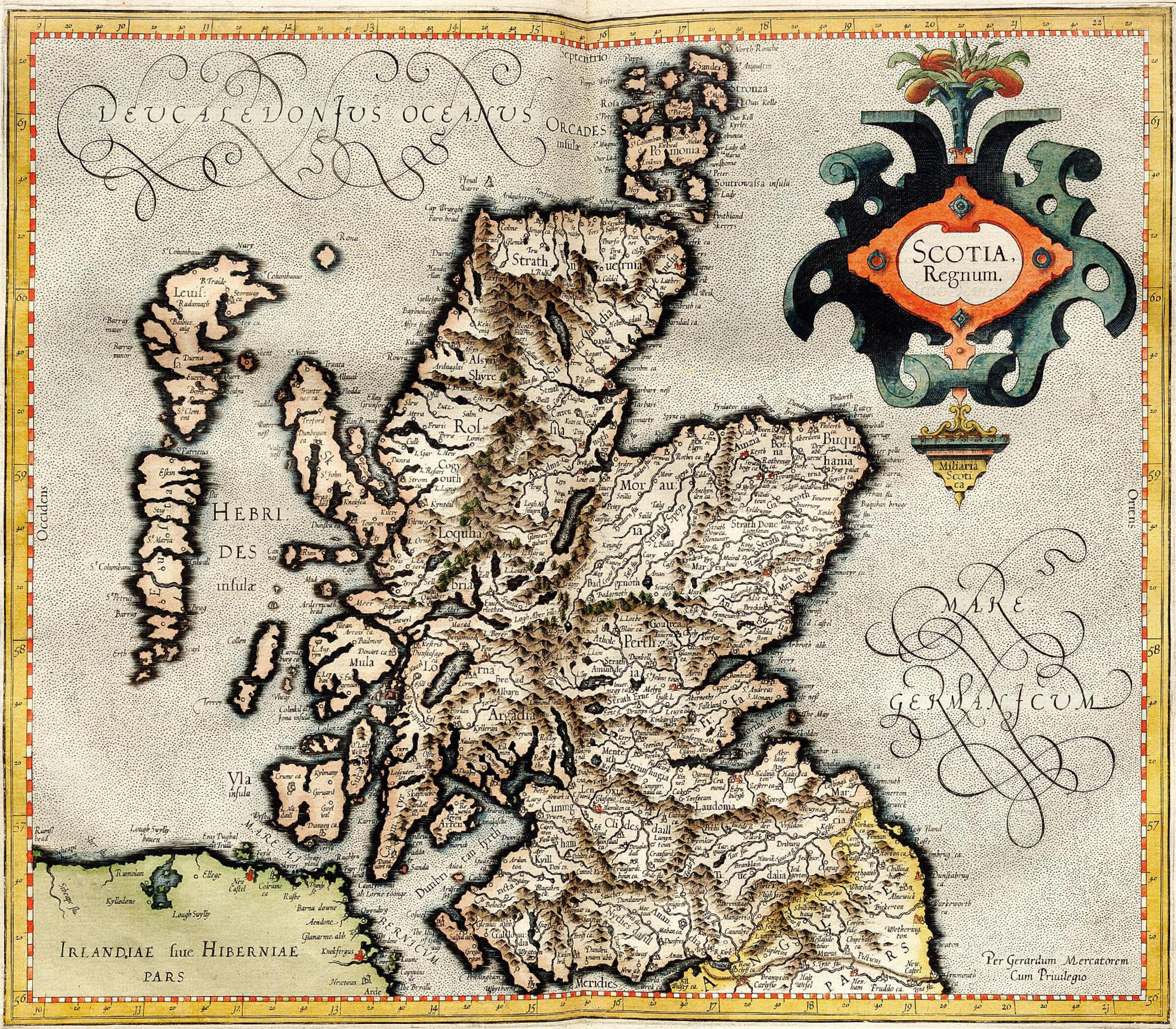
Scotia Regnum by Mercator, published in 1595

In 1595 a map of Scotia Regnum, drawing on various earlier works, appeared in Gerardus Mercator’s Atlas at a scale of circa 25 miles to the inch. This became the basis of maps of Scotland until the mid-seveteenth century. (Note: Mercator's earlier map of 1564 was the first "satisfactory representation" of the Hebrides but both this map and the 1573 atlas by Abraham Ortelius based on it "seem to have been unknown by Scottish historians of the period".)

John Elder created a map of Scotland, now lost, for the English crown in 1543. George Lily created a map of the British Isles that was published in Rome in 1546. The map is based in part on the Gough Map and includes improvements to the shape of the Scottish coastline. In 1566 Scotland appeared on a map attributed to the Veronese map-maker Paolo Forlani and was in turn based partly on Lily’s earlier work. English cartographer Laurence Nowell created a map at roughly the same time with about 600 place names identified.

A 1559 engraving of Lily’s Insulae Britannia

Frenchman Nicolas de Nicolay’s chart of 1583 was in part based on a circumnavigation of the country in the 1540s and the work of hydrographer Alexander Lindsay. This charter formed part of a rutter and the circumnavigation on which it was partly based was commissioned (in contrast to several of the above) by James V as a means of consolidating Scottish state authority rather than undermining it.

Mercator’s 1595 map was thus able to make use of the Nicolay and Nowell maps, although by then Timothy Pont had already commenced his influential work that would inform Scottish map-making in the following century. (Note: Pont did not visit the "more barbarous parts of the country" until 1608.)

At this time various town plans of Scottish settlements also began to appear such as Edinburgh (Braun and Hogenberg, 1582) and St Andrews (Geddie, 1580) as did maps of battle sites and plans of military paraphernalia such as forts and their surrounding defences, in particular during Henry VIII's "Rough Wooing".

== Pont and Blaeu ==
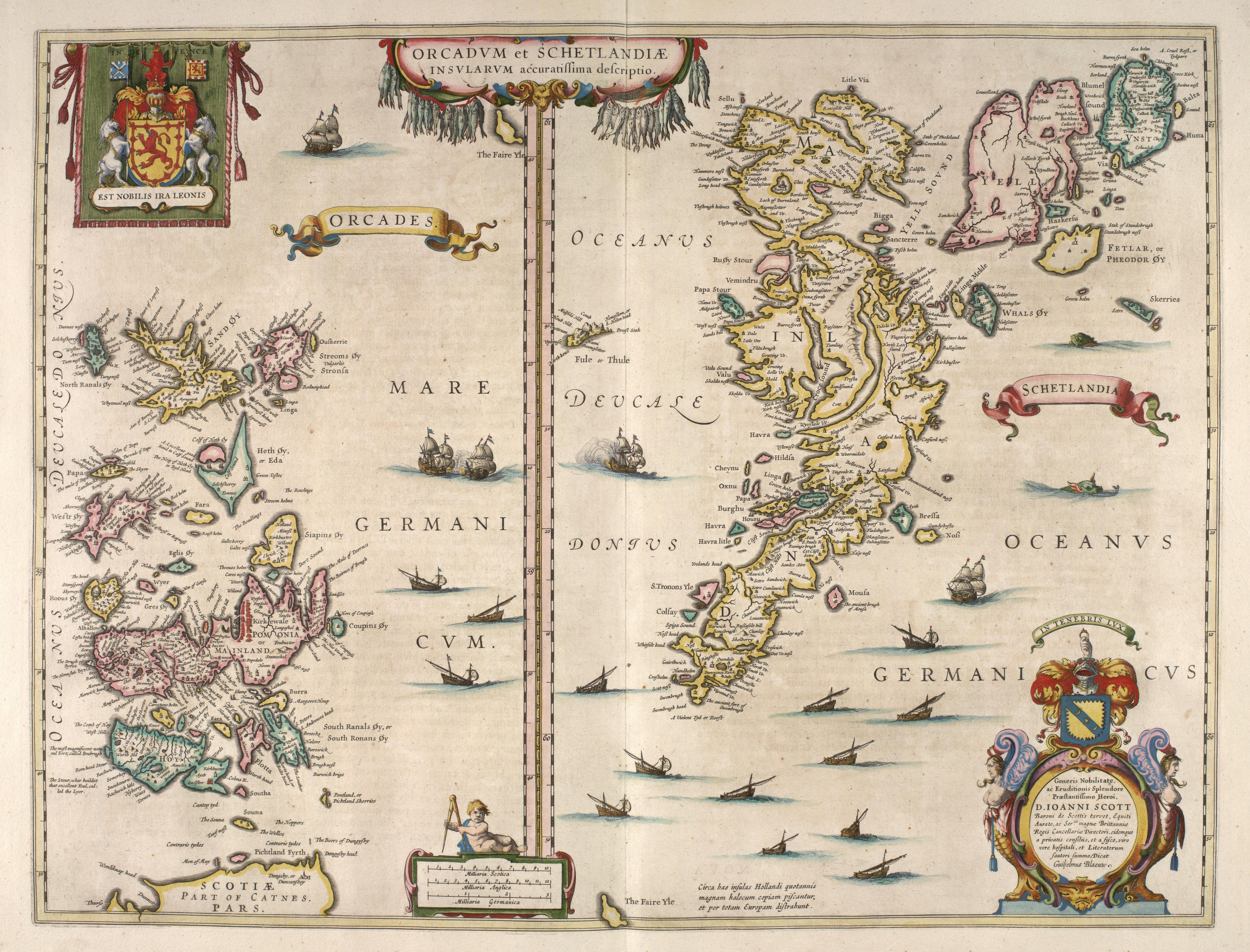
Blaeu's 1654 map of Orkney and Shetland based on Pont's survey.

Pont (c. 1565 – c. 1615) was a Scottish minister, cartographer and topographer. He was the first to produce a detailed map of Scotland and his maps are among the earliest surviving to show a European country in detail from an actual survey. He made a complete survey of all the shires and islands (Note: Not all of Pont's maps survive and it is not known for certain if he did in fact provide such comprehensive coverage. For example, no maps of the Hebrides are known.) of the kingdom, visiting remote districts and making drawings on the spot. (Note: The dating of Pont's survey is not certain. He graduated from the University of St Andrews in 1583 and the survey was completed at some point between that year and 1614. His only dated map is that of Clydesdale (1596) and it is known that his written description of Cunninghame is from 1604-08.) A contemporary described how Pont "personally surveyed...and added such cursory observations on the monuments of antiquity...as were proper for the furnishing out of future descriptions." He died having almost completed his task and James VI gave instructions that the maps should be purchased from and prepared for publication, but on account of the disorders of the time they were nearly forgotten. The maps were so "carelessly kept by his heirs that they were in great danger of destruction from moths and vermin". Sir John Scot of Scotstarvet prevailed on Robert Gordon of Straloch to undertake their revision with a view to publication. The task of revision was completed by Gordon's son James and they were published in Joan Blaeu's Atlas Novus, vol. v. Amsterdam, 1654 (Note: Reissued in 1662 in vol. vi.) in 78 maps on 38 sheets. This work has been described as "one of Scotland's - and early modern Europe's - greatest cartographic treasures". (Note: The atlas was published in Latin and within a few years French, German and Spanish editions followed but there was no English language version. In 2006 The Orkneys and Schetland in Blaeu's Atlas Novus of 1654 was published, including a translation from Latin to English by Ian Cunningham.)

Although the maps provide considerable detail in some areas - there are 9,500 named places - some areas are treated cursorily. Sutherland for example is described as "extreem wildernes". Furthermore, as was common at the time, Pont's work was an excerise in chorography, that is he was aiming to provide a sense of the character of place rather than precise measurement. Nonetheless, map-making was an expensive undertaking and although John Adair was commissioned by the Scottish state to undertake a new survey in 1686 it was not completed and Blaeu's outline continued to provide the basis for many 'new' maps until the end of the 18th century.

== Board of Ordnance ==
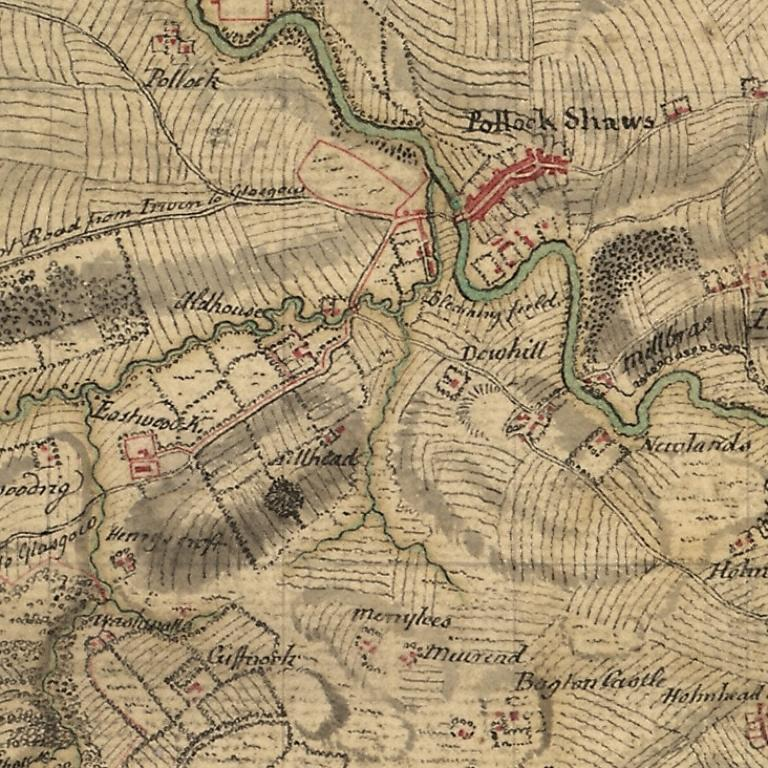
Detail of Pollokshaws, now part of Glasgow, from a map in William Roy's Military Survey of Scotland.

The Board of Ordnance was a Britain-wide institution which was re-organised in 1683 and which commenced a mapping of Scotland from a military point of view and using more modern surveying techniques. The maps include roads, battle sites, forts, castles and the earliest town plans of Inverness and Perth. Over 800 of the maps they produced survive to the present day.

In the wake of the 1745 Jacobite Rebellion a new military survey was entrusted to William Roy, an officer of the Board of Ordnance in Scotland. Roy stated that the government's intention was:

that a country, so very inacessible by nature should be thoroughly explored and laid open, by establishing military posts in its inmost recesses and carrying roads of communication to its remotest parts.

A survey of the Highlands was completed in 1752 and of the Lowlands by 1755. The survey was produced at a scale of 1 inch to 1,000 yards (1:36,000) and included "the Duke of Cumberland's Map", now held in the British Library. Thereafter, work was curtailed by the Seven Years' War.

== Ordnance Survey ==
The origins of the Ordnance Survey, which eventually took over from the Board of Ordnance, also lay in the aftermath of the Jacobite rising of 1745.

In 1801, the first one-inch-to-the-mile (1:63,360 scale) map was published, detailing the county of Kent although it was many years before work was completed in Scotland and the north of England.

By 1846, the production of six-inch maps of Ireland was complete. This had led to a demand for similar treatment in England, and work was proceeding on extending the six-inch map to northern England, but only a three-inch scale for most of Scotland.

In subsequent years numerous editions have appeared including:

- The One Inch map of 1798–1878;
- The Six Inch map of 1830–1888;
- The One Inch map of 1919–1930;
- The 1:10,000 map of 1949–1974.

The Ordnance Survey continue to be the state's map-making arm to the present day, although much of the mapping is now accessed digitally rather than on paper.

== Other mapping techniques ==
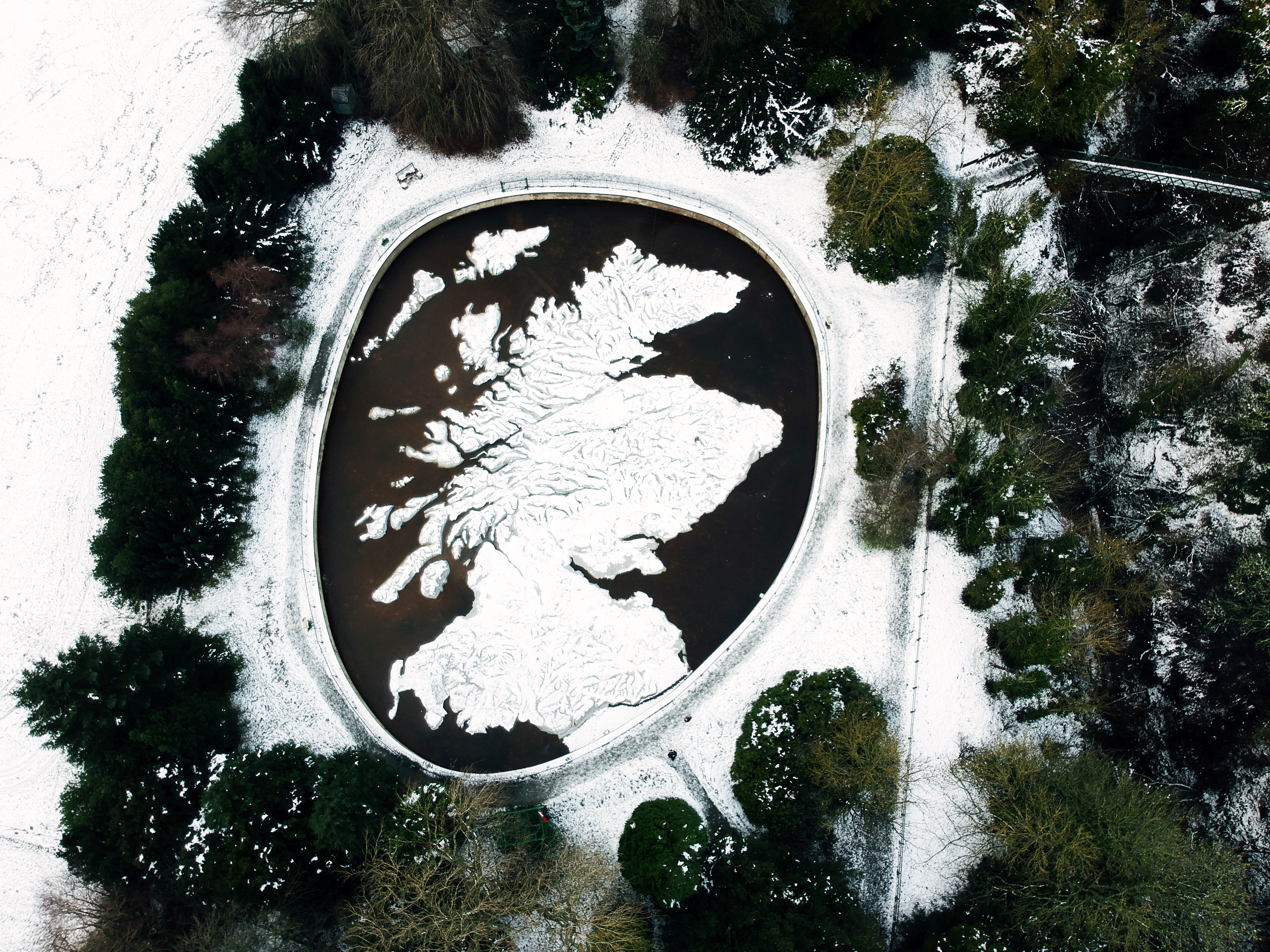
Aerial view of the snow-covered Great Polish Map of Scotland

Maps, once expensive and written in languages not accessible to ordinary people, are now ubiquitous and their uses very broad. Examples from the past and present include:

- Road maps such as those produced by John Bartholomew and Son;
- Maps for sporting purposes such as those created to identify fishing pools on salmon rivers;
- Maps of crime scenes - over 1,500 of which survive from the 19th century; (Note: An example is that of a fatal a shooting at the Hydropathic Hotel at Cluny Hill in Forres in 1869.)
- Maps to support fictional works e.g. of David Balfour's travels in R.L. Stevenson's Kidnapped;
- The Great Polish Map of Scotland, claimed to be the world's largest terrain relief model.

== See also ==
- Geography of Scotland in the Middle Ages
- Geography of Scotland in the early modern era
- Scottish island names
