= Bovey =

Bovey may refer to:

- Bovey, Minnesota, United States
- Bovey (surname)
- River Bovey, Devon, England
- Bovey Tracey, a town in Devon, England
- North Bovey, a village in Devon, England
