= Bovey (surname) =

Bovey is a surname of British origin, which originally meant a person from near the River Bovey in England. Notable people with the surname include:

- Alixe Bovey (born 1973), British historian
- Catherine Bovey (1669–1726), British philanthropist
- Denis Bovey (1929–2023), British priest
- Grant Bovey (born 1961), British businessman and reality TV participant
- Henry Bovey (1852–1912), Canadian engineer
- Jolann Bovey (born 1996), Swiss swimmer
- Mungo Bovey (born 1959), British lawyer
- Patricia Bovey (born 1948), Canadian politician
- Ralph Bovey (died 1679), British sheriff
- Simon Bovey (born 1979), British writer
- Victor H. Bovey (1856–1916), American politician
