= Victor H. Bovey =

American farmer and politician

Victor H. Bovey (March 6, 1856 – June 19, 1916) was an American farmer and politician.

Bovey was born in Pine Creek Township, Ogle County, Illinois. He went to the Rock River Seminary. Bovey was a farmer and taught school. Bovey served on the Ogle County Board and served as chairman of the county board. He also served as assessor for the Pine Creek Township. Bovey served in the Illinois House of Representatives from 1895 to 1899 and was a Republican. Bovey died from injuries at a hospital in Dixon, Illinois after falling into a stone quarry at his farm in Pine Creek Township.
