= Alixe Bovey =

Canadian art historian (born 1974)

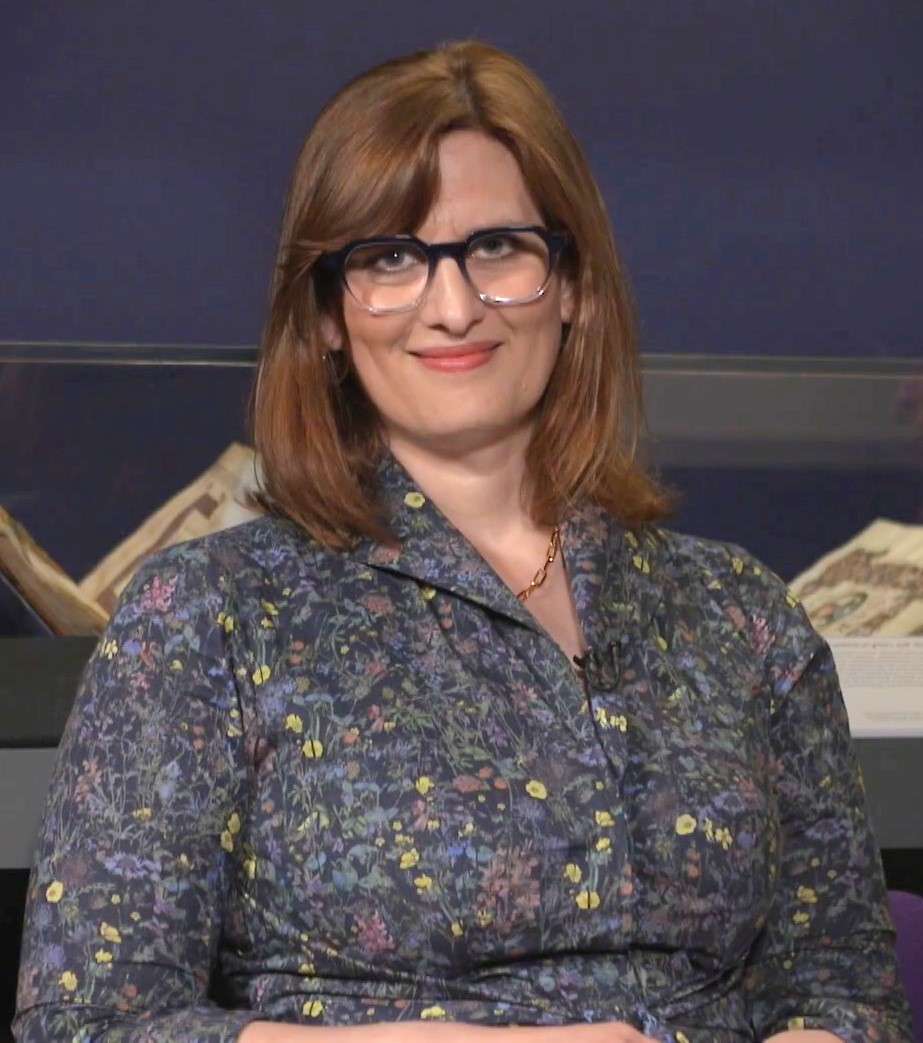
- Bovey in 2022
- Born: 1974
- Known for: art historian

Alixe Bovey FSA (born 1974) is a Canadian medieval art historian and Dean and Deputy Director at the Courtauld Institute of Art, a college of the University of London. Her research has been chiefly concerned with pictorial narratives and their cultural and literary context. She has also written on medieval monsters.

In 2008, Bovey presented the BBC television series In Search of Medieval Britain, in which she retraced a series of journeys through Britain in the Middle Ages using the Gough Map.

== Academic career ==
Bovey studied history and medieval studies at the University of Victoria in British Columbia. She was awarded an MA and PhD in History of Art at the Courtauld in London. Bovey worked as a curator in the British Library’s Department of Manuscripts for four years following her PhD. She was a Lecturer, then Senior Lecturer in Medieval History in the University of Kent's School of History.

Bovey rejoined the Courtauld as Head of Research and Senior Lecturer in Medieval History of Art in 2015. She was appointed Dean and Deputy Director in November 2020.

The Society of Antiquaries of London elected Bovey as a Fellow in 2013. Bovey was awarded a British Academy Mid-Career Fellowship in 2014, providing financial support for her project Giants in the City: Mythic History as Material Culture in London from the Middle Ages to the 21st Century'.

She currently serves on the Editorial and Advisory Board of the Journal of the Warburg and Courtauld Institutes. She is a Member of the Fabric Advisory Committee of Canterbury Cathedral and is a Trustee of the Association for Art History.

== Selected publications ==
- (2002) Monsters and Grotesques in Medieval Manuscripts, The British Library Publishing Division
- (2005) The Chaworth Roll: A Fourteenth-Century Genealogy of the Kings of England, Sam Fogg Rare Books
- (2005) The Tacuinum Sanitatis: An Early Renaissance Guide to Health, Sam Fogg Rare Books
- (2013) Medieval Art, Architecture & Archaeology at Canterbury, Routledge
