= Geography of Scotland in the Middle Ages =

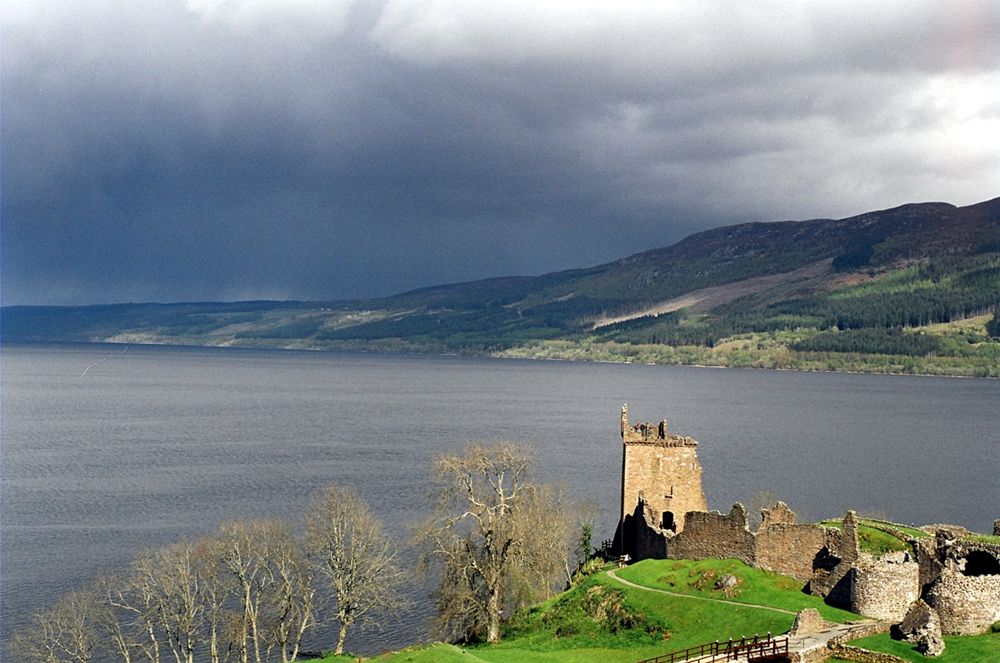
Loch Ness, at the north-east end of the Great Glen Fault, which divides the Highland zone. The thirteenth-century Urquhart Castle can be seen in the foreground.

The geography of Scotland in the Middle Ages covers all aspects of the land that is now Scotland, including physical and human, between the departure of the Romans in the early fifth century from what are now the southern borders of the country, to the adoption of the major aspects of the Renaissance in the early sixteenth century. Scotland was defined by its physical geography, with its long coastline of inlets, islands and inland lochs, high proportion of land over 60 metres above sea level and heavy rainfall. It is divided between the Highlands and Islands and the Scottish Lowlands, which are subdivided by geological features including fault lines, mountains, hills, bogs and marshes. This made communications by land problematic and raised difficulties for political unification, but also for invading armies.

Roman occupation of what is now southern Scotland seems to have had very little impact on settlement patterns, with Iron Age hill forts and promontory forts in the south and Brochs and wheelhouses in the north, continuing to be occupied in the early medieval period. The study of place names and archaeological evidence indicates a pattern of early medieval settlement by the Picts, most densely around the north-east coastal plain; early Gaelic settlement was predominately in the western mainland and neighbouring islands. Anglian settlement in the south-east reached into West Lothian, and to a lesser extent into south-western Scotland. Later Norse settlement was probably most extensive in Orkney and Shetland, with lighter settlement in the Western Islands.

From the reign of David I (r. 1124–1153), there is evidence of burghs, particularly on the east coast, which are the first identifiable towns in Scotland. Probably based on existing settlements, they grew in number and significance through the medieval period. More than 50 royal burghs are known to have been established by the end of the thirteenth century and a similar number of baronial and ecclesiastical burghs were created between 1450 and 1516, acting as focal points for administration, as well as local and international trade. In the early Middle Ages the country was divided between speakers of Gaelic, Pictish, Cumbric and English. Over the next few centuries Cumbric and Pictish were gradually overlaid and replaced by Gaelic, English and Norse. From at least the reign of David I, Gaelic was replaced by French as the language of the court and nobility. In the late Middle Ages Scots, derived mainly from Old English, became the dominant language.

In the middle of this period, through a process of conquest, consolidation and treaty, the boundaries of Scotland were gradually extended from a small area under direct control of the kings of Alba in the east, to almost its modern borders. For most of the medieval era the monarchy and court was itinerant, with Scone and Dunfermline acting as important centres and later Roxburgh, Stirling and Perth, before Edinburgh emerged as the political capital in the fourteenth century. Largely as a result of Viking raids from about 800, Iona declined as a religious centre. Despite royal attempts to establish a new religious centre at Dunkeld, it was St. Andrews on the east coast, close to the heartland of Pictish settlement, that emerged as the most important religious focus of the kingdom.

== Physical ==
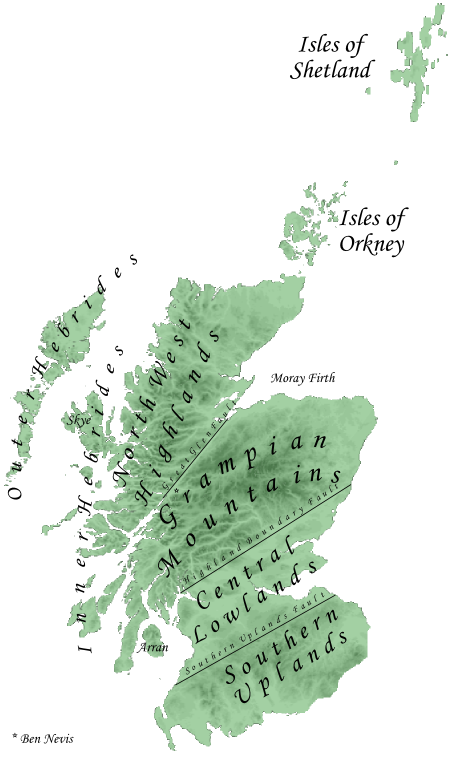
The topography of Scotland

Modern Scotland is half the size of England and Wales in area, but with its many inlets, islands and inland lochs, it has roughly the same amount of coastline at 4,000 miles (6,400 km). Only a fifth of Scotland is less than 60 metres (200 ft) above sea level. Its east Atlantic position means that it has very heavy rainfall, today about 700 mm (28 in) per year in the east and more than 1,000 mm (39 in) in the west. This encouraged the spread of blanket peat bog, the acidity of which, combined with high levels of wind and salt spray, made most of the islands treeless. The existence of hills, mountains, quicksands and marshes made internal communication and conquest extremely difficult and may have contributed to the fragmented nature of political power. The early Middle Ages was a period of climate deterioration, with a drop in temperature and an increase in rainfall, resulting in more land becoming unproductive. This was reversed in the period c. 1150 to 1300, with warm dry summers and less severe winters allowing cultivation at much greater heights above sea level and making land more productive. In the late Middle Ages, average temperatures began to reduce again, with cooler and wetter conditions limiting the extent of arable agriculture, particularly in the Highlands.

The defining factor in the geography of Scotland is the distinction between the Highlands and Islands in the north and west and the Lowlands in the south and east. The Highlands are further divided into the Northwest Highlands and the Grampian Mountains by the fault line of the Great Glen. The Lowlands are divided into the fertile belt of the Central Lowlands and the higher terrain of the Southern Uplands, which included the Cheviot Hills, over which the border with England came to run by the end of the period. Some of these regions were further divided by mountains, major rivers and marshes. The Central Lowland belt averages about 50 miles (80 km) in width, and because it contains most of the good quality agricultural land and has easier communications, could support most of the urbanisation and elements of conventional medieval government. The Southern Uplands, and particularly the Highlands were economically less productive and much more difficult to govern. This provided Scotland with a form of protection, as minor English incursions had to cross the difficult Southern Uplands; two major attempts at conquest by the English, under Edward I and then Edward III, were unable to penetrate the Highlands, from where potential resistance could reconquer the Lowlands. But it also made those areas problematic to govern for Scottish kings and much of the political history of the era after the wars of independence centred on attempts to resolve problems of entrenched localism.

== Settlement and demography ==
Roman influence beyond Hadrian's Wall does not appear to have had a major impact on settlement patterns, with Iron Age hill forts and promontory forts continuing to be occupied through the early medieval period. These often had defences of dry stone or timber laced walls, sometimes with a palisade. The large numbers of these forts has been taken to suggest peripatetic monarchies and aristocracies, moving around their domains to control and administer them. In the Northern and Western Isles the sites of Iron Age Brochs and wheel houses continued to be occupied, but were gradually replaced with less imposing cellular houses. There are a handful of major timber halls in the south, comparable to those excavated in Anglo-Saxon England and dated to the seventh century. In the areas of Scandinavian settlement in the Islands and along the coast a lack of timber meant that native materials had to be adopted for house building, often combining layers of stone with turf.

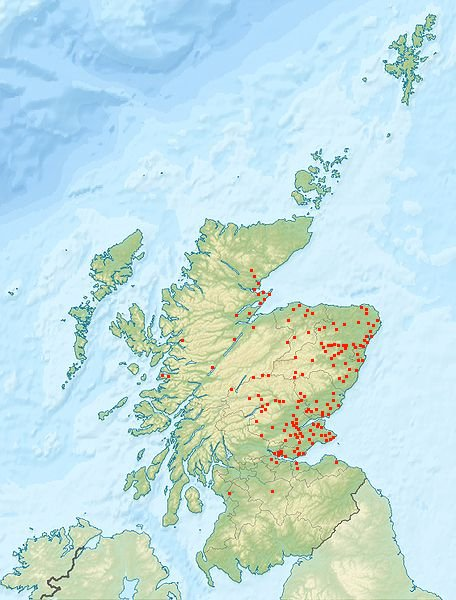
Map showing the distribution of Pit- place names in Scotland, thought to indicate Pictish settlement

Place-name evidence suggests that the densest areas of Pictish settlement were in the north-east coastal plain: in modern Fife, Perthshire, Angus, Aberdeen and around the Moray Firth, although later Gaelic migration may have erased some Pictish names from the record. Early Gaelic settlement appears to have been in the regions of the western mainland of Scotland between Cowal and Ardnamurchan, and the adjacent islands, later extending up the West coast in the eighth century. There is place name and archaeological evidence of Anglian settlement in south-east Scotland reaching into West Lothian, and to a lesser extent into south-western Scotland. Later Norse settlement was probably most extensive in Orkney and Shetland, with lighter settlement in the Western Islands, particularly the Hebrides and on the mainland in Caithness, stretching along fertile river valleys through Sutherland and into Ross. There was also extensive settlement in Bernicia stretching into the modern borders and Lowlands.

From the reign of David I, there are records of burghs (a Germanic word for a fortress), towns that were granted certain legal privileges by the crown. Most of the burghs granted charters during David's reign probably already existed as settlements. Charters were copied almost verbatim from those used in England, and early burgesses were usually English or Flemish. They were able to impose tolls and fines on traders within a region outside their settlements. Most of the early burghs were on the east coast. Among them were the largest and wealthiest, including Aberdeen, Berwick, Perth and Edinburgh, whose growth was facilitated by trade with the continent. In the south-west Glasgow, Ayr and Kirkcudbright benefited from the less profitable sea trade with Ireland, and to a lesser extent France and Spain. Burghs were typically surrounded by a palisade or had a castle and usually a market place, with a widened high street or junction, often marked by a mercat cross beside which were houses for the burgesses and other inhabitants. Around 15 burghs can be traced to the reign of David I, and there is evidence of 55 by 1296. In addition to the major royal burghs, the late Middle Ages saw the proliferation of baronial and ecclesiastical burghs; 51 were created between 1450 and 1516. Most were much smaller than their royal counterparts, and excluded from international trade they acted mainly as local markets and centres of craftsmanship.

There are almost no written sources from which to re-construct the demography of early medieval Scotland. Estimates have been made of a population of 10,000 inhabitants in Dál Riata and 80–100,000 for Pictland, which was probably the largest region. It is likely that the fifth and sixth centuries saw higher mortality rates owing to the appearance of bubonic plague, which may have reduced the net population. The examination of burial sites for this period like that at Hallowhill, St Andrews indicate a life expectancy of only 26–29. The known conditions have been taken to suggest it was a high-fertility, high-mortality society, similar to many developing countries in the modern world, with a relatively young demographic profile, and perhaps early childbearing, and large numbers of children for women. The result would have been a relatively small proportion of available workers to the number of mouths to feed, making it difficult to produce a surplus that would allow demographic growth and more complex societies to develop. From the formation of the kingdom of Alba in the tenth century, to before the Black Death reached the country in 1349, estimates based on the amount of farmable land, suggest that population may have grown from half a million to a million. Although there is no reliable documentation on the impact of the plague, there are many anecdotal references to abandoned land in the following decades. If the pattern followed that in England, then the population may have fallen to as low as half a million by the end of the 15th century. Compared with the situation after the redistribution of population in the later clearances and the Industrial Revolution, these numbers would have been relatively evenly spread over the kingdom, with roughly half living north of the Tay. Perhaps ten per cent of the population lived in one of burghs. It has been suggested that they would have had a mean population of about 2,000, but many would be much smaller than 1,000 and the largest, Edinburgh, probably had a population of more than 10,000 by the end of the era.

== Language ==
An interpretation of the linguistic divide c. 1400, based on place-name evidence. Scottish Gaelic Scots Norn

Modern linguists divide Celtic languages into two major groups: the P-Celtic, from which the Brythonic languages – Welsh, Breton, Cornish and Cumbric derive – and the Q-Celtic, from which come the Goidelic languages – Irish, Manx and Gaelic. The Pictish language remains enigmatic, since the Picts had no written script of their own and all that survives are place names and some isolated inscriptions in Irish ogham script. Most modern linguists accept that, although the nature and unity of Pictish language is unclear, it belonged to the former group. Historical sources, as well as place-name evidence, indicate the ways in which the Pictish language in the north and Cumbric languages in the south were overlaid and replaced by Gaelic, Old English and later Norse in this period. By the High Middle Ages the majority of people within Scotland spoke the Gaelic language, then simply called Scottish, or in Latin, lingua Scotica.

In the Northern Isles the Norse language brought by Scandinavian occupiers and settlers evolved into the local Norn, which lingered until the end of the eighteenth century and Norse may also have survived as a spoken language until the sixteenth century in the Outer Hebrides. French, Flemish and particularly English became the main language of Scottish burghs, most of which were in the south and east, an area to which Anglian settlers had already brought a form of Old English. In the later part of the twelfth century, the writer Adam of Dryburgh described Lowland Lothian as "the Land of the English in the Kingdom of the Scots". At least from the accession of David I, Gaelic ceased to be the main language of the royal court and was replaced by Norman French, to be followed by the Chancery, the castles of nobles and the upper order of the Church.

In the late Middle Ages, Middle Scots, often simply but inaccurately called English, became the dominant language of the country. It was derived largely from Old English, with the addition of elements from Gaelic and French. Although resembling the language spoken in northern England, it became a distinct language from the late fourteenth century. It was adopted by the ruling elite as they gradually abandoned French. By the fifteenth century it was the language of government, with acts of parliament, council records and treasurer's accounts almost all using it from the reign of James I onwards. As a result, Gaelic, once dominant north of the Tay, began a steady decline.

== Political ==
At its foundation in the tenth century, the combined Gaelic and Pictish kingdom of Alba contained only a small proportion of modern Scotland. Even when these lands were added to in the tenth and eleventh centuries, the term "Scotia" was applied in sources only to the region between the Forth, the central Grampians and the River Spey, and only began to be used to describe all of the lands under the authority of the Scottish crown from the second half of the twelfth century. The expansion of Alba into the wider kingdom of Scotland was a gradual process combining external conquest and the suppression of occasional rebellions, with the extension of seigniorial power through the placement of effective agents of the crown. Neighbouring independent kings became subject to Alba and eventually disappeared from the records. In the ninth century the term mormaer, meaning "great steward", began to appear in the records to describe the rulers of Moray, Strathearn, Buchan, Angus and Mearns, who may have acted as "marcher lords" for the kingdom to counter the Viking threat. Later the process of consolidation is associated with the feudalism introduced by David I, which, particularly in the east and south where the crown's authority was greatest, saw the placement of lordships, often based on castles, and the creation of administrative sheriffdoms, which overlay the pattern of local thegns.

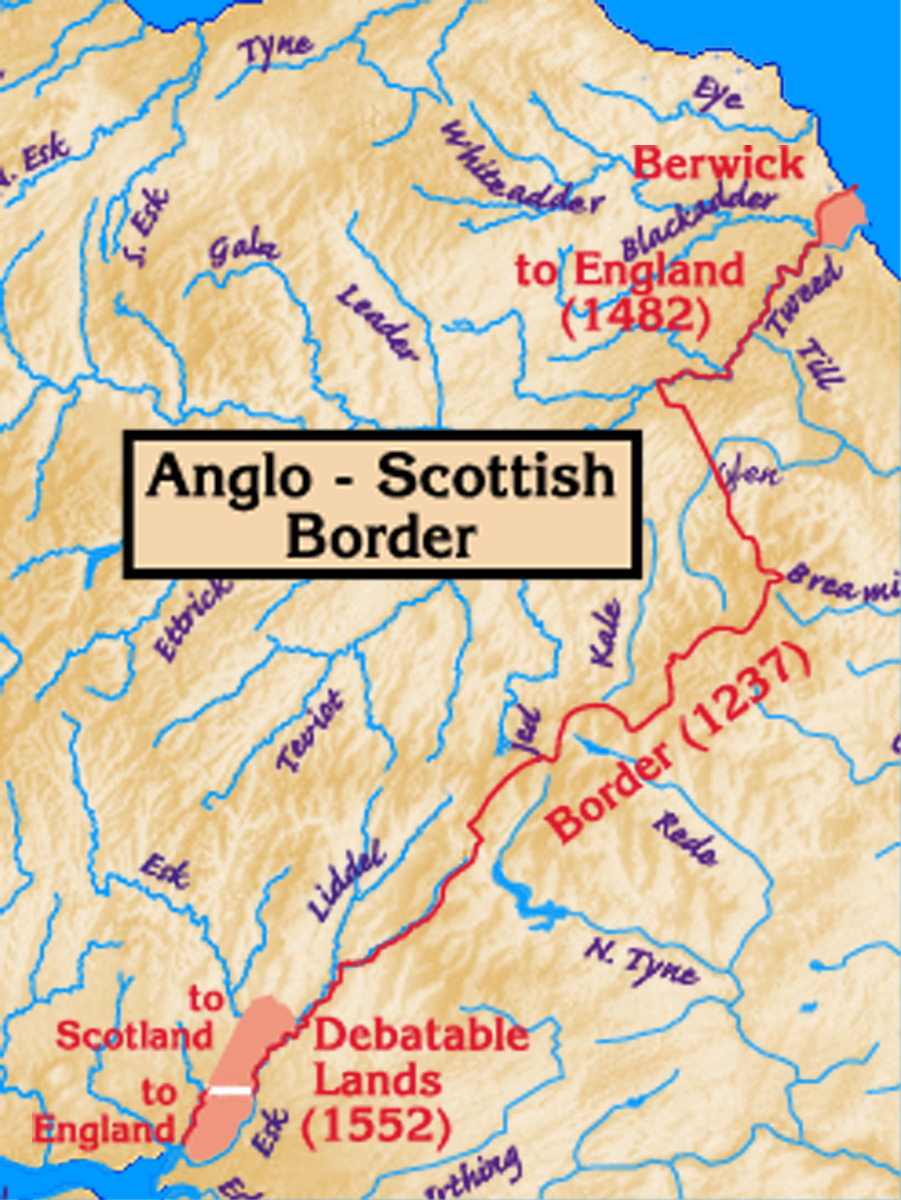
Development of the border with England

Most of the regions of what became Scotland had strong cultural and economic ties elsewhere: to England, Ireland, Scandinavian and mainland Europe. Internal communications were difficult and the country lacked an obvious geographical centre; the king kept an itinerant court, with no "capital" as such. Dunfermline emerged as a major royal centre in the reign of Malcolm III, and David I tried to build up Roxburgh as a royal centre, but in the twelfth and thirteenth centuries more charters were issued at Scone than anywhere else. Other popular locations in the early part of the era were nearby Perth, Stirling, Dunfermline and Edinburgh. In the later Middle Ages the king moved between royal castles, particularly Perth and Stirling, but also held judicial sessions throughout the kingdom; Edinburgh only began to emerge as the capital in the reign of James III, at the cost of considerable unpopularity to the king. Iona was an early religious centre, and was said to be the burial place of the kings of Alba until the end of the eleventh century, but declined as a result of Viking raids from 794. The transfer of part of the relics of St. Columba from there to Dunkeld in the mid-ninth century, closer to the centre of the kingdom and close to Scone, the ceremonial site of coronations, may have represented an attempt to develop a new religious centre, but it was St. Andrews, with its biblical cult, probably established on the east coast in the centre of their political heartland by Pictish kings as early as the eighth century, and never a major political capital or trading centre, which emerged as the centre of the Scottish church.

Until the thirteenth century the borders with England were very fluid. Northumbria and Cumbria were annexed to Scotland by David I, but lost under his grandson and successor Malcolm IV in 1157. The Treaty of York (1237) and Treaty of Perth (1266) fixed the borders of the Kingdom of the Scots with England and Norway respectively, close to the modern boundaries. The Isle of Man fell under English control in the fourteenth century, despite several attempts to restore Scottish authority. The English were able to annexe a large slice of the Lowlands under Edward III, but these losses were gradually regained, particularly while England was preoccupied with the Wars of the Roses (1455–85). In 1468 the last great acquisition of Scottish territory occurred when James III married Margaret of Denmark, receiving the Orkney Islands and the Shetland Islands in payment of her dowry. In 1482, Berwick, a border fortress and the largest port in Medieval Scotland, fell to the English once again, for what was to be the final change of hands. The only uncertain area was the small region of the Debatable Lands at the south-west end of the border, which would be divided by a French-mediated commission in 1552.
