= Geography of Scotland in the early modern era =

Ettrick Forest, previously a hunting reserve was opened up for settlement in this period

The geography of Scotland in the early modern era covers all aspects of the land in Scotland, including physical and human, between the sixteenth century and the beginnings of the Agricultural Revolution and industrialisation in the eighteenth century. The defining factor in the geography of Scotland is the distinction between the Highlands and Islands in the north and west and the Lowlands in the south and east. The Highlands were subdivided by the Great Glen and the Lowlands into the fertile Central Lowlands and the Southern Uplands. The Uplands and Highlands had a relatively short growing season, exacerbated by the Little Ice Age, which peaked towards the end of the seventeenth century.

A network of roads developed in the Lowlands in this period. Drover's roads, between the Highlands and north-east England, had become established by the end of the seventeenth century and a series of military roads were built and maintained as a response to the Jacobite risings in the eighteenth century. At the beginning of the period, most farming was based on the Lowland fermtoun or Highland baile, but a system of land ownership based on large estates emerged. This was the beginning of a process that would create a landscape of rectangular fields and carefully located farm complexes with interconnecting roads. There was an attempt improve agriculture, resulting in new crops, techniques and enclosures began to displace the run rig system and free pasture.

There are almost no reliable sources with which to track the population of Scotland before the late seventeenth century. It probably grew for most of the period, reaching 1,234,575 by 1691 and 1,265,380 by the first census in 1751. Compared with the situation after the redistribution of population as a result of the clearances and the Industrial Revolution that began in the eighteenth century, these numbers were more evenly spread over the kingdom, with roughly half north of the River Tay. Most were housed in small hamlets and isolated dwellings. The Little Ice Age saw the abandonment of marginal land, but new settlements were created as a result of the opening up of hunting reserves like Ettrick Forest and less desirable low-lying land was also settled. As the population expanded, some settlements were sub-divided to create new hamlets. Perhaps ten per cent of the population lived in one of the many burghs that had grown up in the later Medieval period, mainly in the east and south of the country. By 1750, with its suburbs, Edinburgh had reached a population of 57,000.

By the early modern era Gaelic had been in geographical decline for three centuries and had begun to be a second class language, confined to the Highlands and Islands. It was gradually being replaced by Middle Scots. From the mid sixteenth century, written Scots was increasingly influenced by the developing Standard English of Southern England, which came to dominate elite discourse. After the Union in 1707 the use of Gaelic and Scots were discouraged by many in authority and education, as was the notion of Scottishness itself. The extent and borders of the kingdom had been fixed in their modern form by the beginning of the sixteenth century, with the exception of the debatable lands, settled by a French led commission in 1552. The accession of James VI to the English throne made the borders less significant in military terms, becoming, in his phrase the "middle shires" of Great Britain, but it remained a jurisdictional and tariff boundary until the Act of Union in 1707. Edinburgh had emerged as the capital in the fifteenth century and continued to be a major administrative centre. From the seventeenth century the responsibilities of shires expanded from judicial functions into wider local administration. The parish also became an important unit of local government. By the mid-seventeenth century this system had largely been rolled out across the Lowlands, but was limited in the Highlands. There was much greater awareness of geography and political boundaries in this period and Scotland was extensively mapped for the first time.

== Physical ==
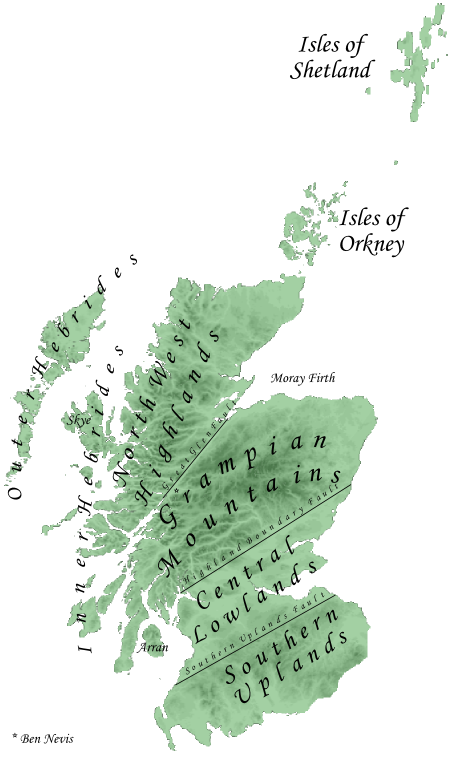
The topography of Scotland

The defining factor in the geography of Scotland is the distinction between the Highlands and Islands in the north and west and the Lowlands in the south and east. The Highlands are further divided into the Northwest Highlands and the Grampian Mountains by the fault line of the Great Glen. The Lowlands are divided into the fertile belt of the Central Lowlands and the higher terrain of the Southern Uplands, which included the Cheviot Hills, over which, as now, the border with England runs. The Central Lowland belt averages about 50 miles in width and, because it contains most of the good quality agricultural land and has easier communications, could support most of the urbanisation and elements of conventional government. However, the Southern Uplands, and particularly the Highlands, were economically less productive and much more difficult to govern. The Uplands and Highlands had a relatively short growing season and, in the extreme case of the upper Grampians, this was an ice free season of four months or less and for much of the Highlands and Uplands of seven months or less. The early modern era also saw the impact of the Little Ice Age, of worldwide colder and wetter weather, which peaked towards the end of the seventeenth century. In 1564 there were thirty-three days of continual frost, and rivers and lochs froze. The 1690s marked its lowest point, leading to the Seven ill years of famine.

Most roads in the Lowlands were maintained by justices from a monetary levy on landholders and work levy on tenants. The development of national grain prices indicates the network had improved considerably by the early eighteenth century. By the end of the seventeenth century, the drover's roads, stretching down from the Highlands through south-west Scotland to north-east England and used for the transport of Highland Cattle for the English meat market, had become firmly established. In the Highlands and Galloway in the early eighteenth century, a series of military roads were built and maintained by the central government, with the aim of facilitating the movement of troops in the event of rebellion.

At the beginning of the period, most farming was based on the Lowland fermtoun or Highland baile, settlements of a handful of families that jointly farmed an area notionally suitable for two or three plough teams, allocated in run rigs, of "runs" (furrows) and "rigs" (ridges), to tenant farmers. They usually ran downhill so that they included both wet and dry land, helping to offset the problems of extreme weather conditions. In this era, a system of land ownership based on large estates emerged as the dominant form as Scottish society was largely divided between a few large estate holders and a large number of workers. This had a major impact on the landscape as feudal systems of ownership were abandoned and land holdings reorganised. This process also facilitated the Scottish Agricultural Revolution that further changed the Scottish landscape from the first half of the eighteenth century. This was the beginning of a process that would create a landscape of rectangular fields, carefully located farm complexes with interconnecting roads.

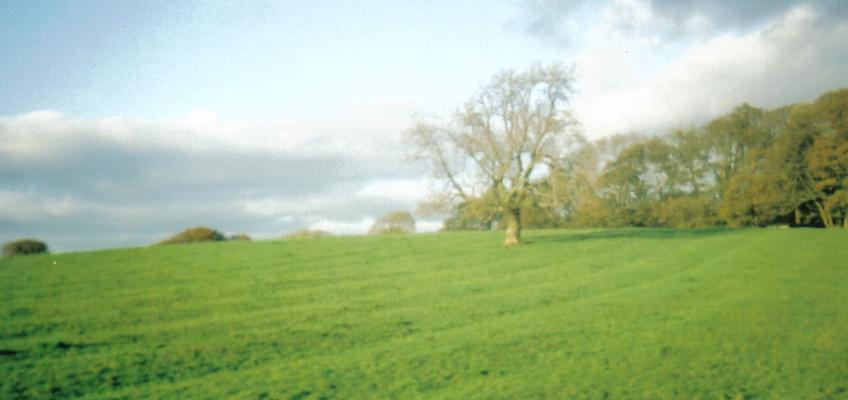
Rig and furrow marks at Buchans Field, Wester Kittochside.

Increasing contacts with England after the Union of 1707 led to a conscious attempt to improve agriculture among the gentry and nobility. The Society of Improvers was founded in 1723, including in its 300 members dukes, earls, lairds and landlords. Haymaking was introduced along with the English plough and foreign grasses, the sowing of rye grass and clover. Turnips and cabbages were introduced, lands enclosed and marshes drained, lime was put down, roads built and woods planted. Drilling and sowing and crop rotation were introduced. The introduction of the potato to Scotland in 1739 greatly improved the diet of the peasantry. Enclosures began to displace the run rig system and free pasture. New farm buildings, often based on designs in patterns books, replaced the fermtoun and regional diversity was replaced with a standardisation of building forms. Smaller farms retained the linear outline of the longhouse, with dwelling house, barn and byre in a row, but in larger farms a three- or four-sided layout became common, separating the dwelling house from barns and servants quarters. There was increasing regional specialisation. The Lothians became a major centre of grain, Ayrshire of cattle breading and the Borders of sheep. However, although some estate holders improved the quality of life of their displaced workers, enclosures led to unemployment and forced migrations to the burghs or abroad.

== Settlement and demography ==
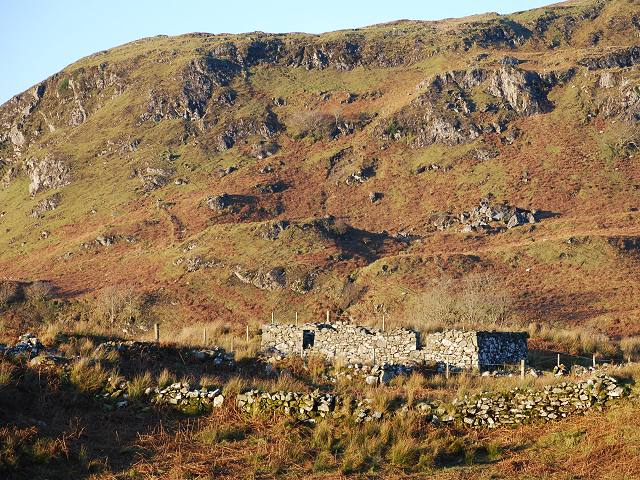
Ruins of a Highland sheiling on marginal land, south of Oban

There are almost no reliable sources with which to track the population of Scotland before the late seventeenth century. Estimates based on English records suggest that by the end of the Middle Ages the Black Death and subsequent recurring outbreaks of the plague may have caused the population of Scotland to fall as low as half a million people. Price inflation, which generally reflects growing demand for food, suggests that this probably expanded in the first half of the sixteenth century, levelling off after the famine of 1595, as prices were relatively stable in the early seventeenth century. Calculations based on Hearth Tax returns for 1691 indicate a population of 1,234,575. This level may have been seriously effected by the famines of the 1690s. The first reliable information available on national population is from the census conducted by the Reverend Alexander Webster in 1755, which showed the inhabitants of Scotland as 1,265,380 persons.

Compared with the situation after the redistribution of population as a result of the clearances and the Industrial Revolution that began in the eighteenth century, the population was evenly spread over the kingdom, with roughly half living north of the Tay. Most of the early modern population, in both the Lowlands and Highlands, was housed in small hamlets and isolated dwellings. One result of the Little Ice Age was the abandonment of marginal land in the early part of the period, as it became impossible to sustain agriculture in some regions, particularly in the uplands, but new settlements were created as a result of the opening up of hunting reserves like Ettrick Forest and less desirable low-lying land was also settled, often incorporating features into their names such as bog, marsh and muir.

As the population expanded, some of these settlements were sub-divided to create new hamlets and more marginal land was again settled, with sheilings (clusters of huts occupied while summer pasture was being used for grazing) becoming permanent settlements. Perhaps ten per cent of the population lived in one of the burghs that had grown up in the later Medieval period, mainly in the east and south of the country. They may have had a mean population of about 2,000, and the largest, Edinburgh, probably had a population of over 10,000 at the beginning of the era, but many were much smaller than 1,000. During the seventeenth century, the number of people living in the capital grew rapidly. It also expanded beyond the city walls in suburbs at Cowgate, Bristo and Westport and by 1750, with its suburbs, it had reached a population of 57,000. The only other towns above 10,000 by the end of the period were Glasgow with 32,000, Aberdeen with around 16,000 and Dundee with 12,000.

== Language ==
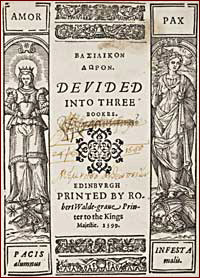
James VI's Basilikon Doron, translated into English from Scots in 1603, beginning an emphasis on Southern English.

By the early modern era Gaelic had been in geographical decline for three centuries and had begun to be a second class language, confined to the Highlands and Islands. It was gradually being replaced by Middle Scots, which became the language of both the nobility and the majority population. Scots was derived substantially from Old English, with Gaelic and French influences. It was called Inglyshe in the fifteenth century and was very close to the language spoken in northern England, but by the sixteenth century, it had established orthographic and literary norms largely independent of those developing in England. From the mid sixteenth century, written Scots was increasingly influenced by the developing Standard English of Southern England due to developments in royal and political interactions with England. With the increasing influence and availability of books printed in England, most writing in Scotland came to be done in the English fashion. Unlike many of his predecessors, James VI generally despised Gaelic culture. Having extolled the virtues of Scots "poesie", after his accession to the English throne, he increasingly favoured the language of southern England. In 1611 the Kirk adopted the Authorized King James Version of the Bible. In 1617 interpreters were declared no longer necessary in the port of London because Scots and Englishmen were now "not so far different bot ane understandeth ane uther". Jenny Wormald, describes James as creating a "three-tier system, with Gaelic at the bottom and English at the top".

After the Union in 1707 and the shift of political power to England, the use of Gaelic and Scots were discouraged by many in authority and education. The Society in Scotland for Propagating Christian Knowledge (SSPCK), established in 1709, aimed to teach English language and end the attachment to Roman Catholicism associated with rebellious Jacobitism. It was partly cultural, intending to "wear out" Gaelic and "learn the people the English tongue". Although SSPCK schools eventually taught in Gaelic, the overall effect contributed to the erosion of Highland culture. Many leading Scots of the period, such as David Hume, considered themselves Northern British rather than Scottish. They attempted to rid themselves of their Scots in a bid to establish Standard English as the official language of the newly formed Union. Many well-off Scots took to learning English through the activities of those such as Thomas Sheridan, who in 1761 gave a series of lectures on English elocution. Charging a guinea at a time (about £200 in today's money) they were attended by over 300 men, and he was made a freeman of the City of Edinburgh. Following this, some of the city's intellectuals formed the Select Society for Promoting the Reading and Speaking of the English Language in Scotland. Nevertheless, Scots remained the vernacular of many rural communities and the growing number of urban working-class Scots.

== Political ==
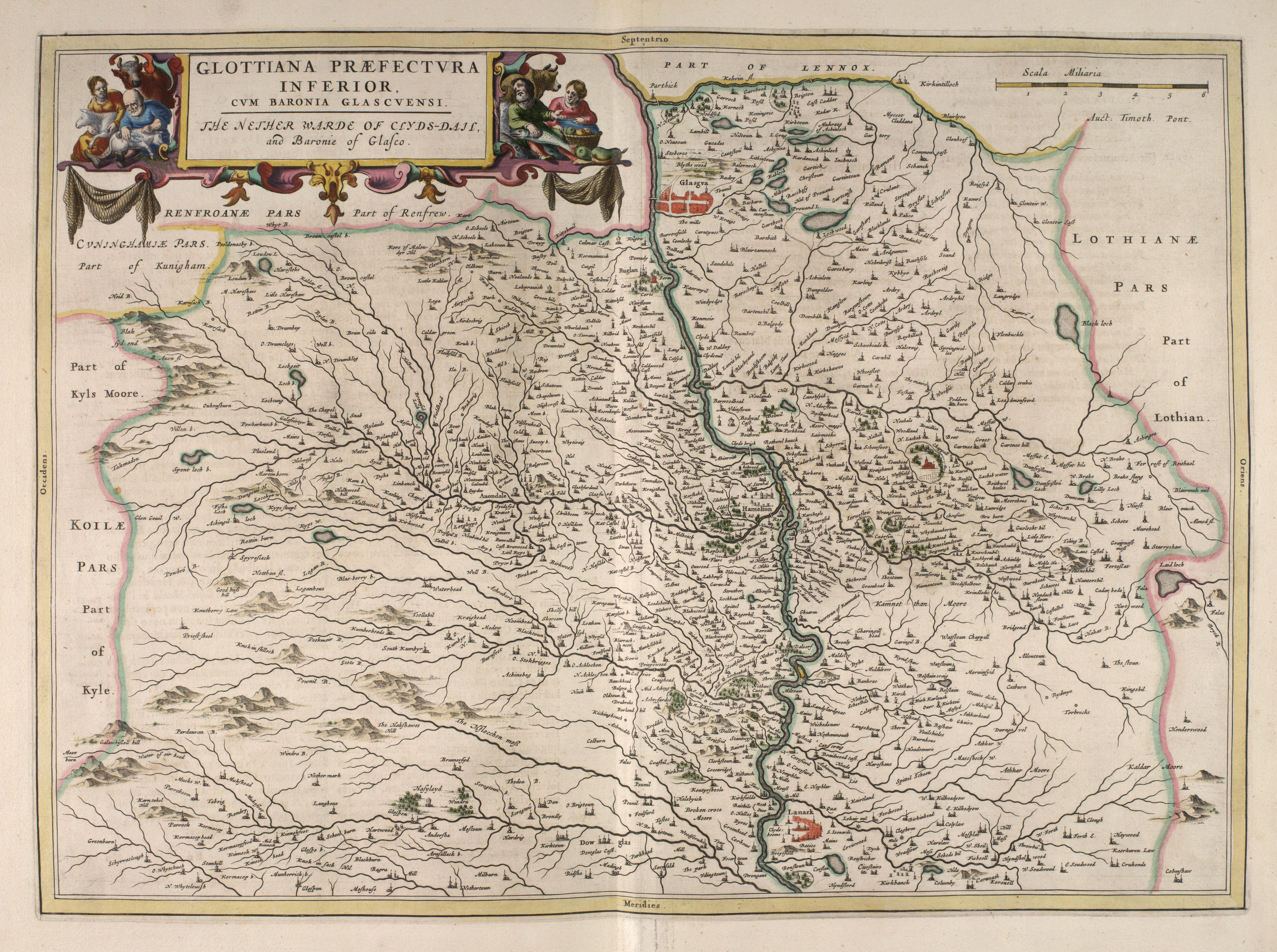
Lower Clydesdale from Blaeu's Atlas novus, 1654

The extent and borders of the kingdom had been fixed in their modern form by the beginning of the sixteenth century. The exception, the debatable lands at the western end of the border with England, were settled by a French led commission in 1552 and the Scots' Dike built to mark the boundary. The Scottish administration of the Borders was divided into three marches: East, West and Middle. The accession of James VI to the English throne made the border less significant in military terms, becoming, in his phrase, the "middle shires" of Great Britain. In 1605, he established a single commission of ten men drawn from equally Scotland and England to bring law and order to the region, but lawlessness continued and it remained a jurisdictional and tariff boundary until the Act of Union in 1707.

Edinburgh had emerged as the capital in the fifteenth century. It was the wealthiest and largest city in the kingdom and held the central law courts, parliament and royal residence at Holyrood Palace. After James VI left for London at the Union of Crowns in 1603, it continued to be the centre of government. Even after the Acts of Union in 1707 removed the parliament, it retained the exchequer and law courts.

From the seventeenth century the responsibilities of shires expanded from judicial functions into wider local administration. In 1667, Commissioners of Supply were appointed in each sheriffdom or shire to collect the cess land tax. The parish also became an important unit of local government after three major pieces of legislation, in 1574, 1579 and 1592, established what would become known as "the Old Poor Law". Pressured by Justices, the parish became responsible for taking care of the destitute in periods of famine, to prevent the impoverished from taking to the roads and causing general disorder. By the mid-seventeenth century the system had largely been rolled out across the Lowlands, but was limited in the Highlands.

There was a growing awareness of geography and political boundaries in this period. Scotland was extensively mapped for the first time. In the last quarter of the sixteenth century, Timothy Pont created a series of sketch maps of Scotland and recorded the names and details of 20,000 places he visited or noted. His work became the basis for the set of maps of Scotland published the following century by Willem and Johannes Blaeu. In the eighteenth century, there was a "militarisation of cartography", by which the armed forces took over the business of mapping. One response to the Jacobite risings in 1715 and 1745 was the Ordnance Survey, from which over 800 military plans survive for Scotland. The new generation of cartographers were engineers and military surveyors.
