= Gough Map =

Late Medieval map of Britain

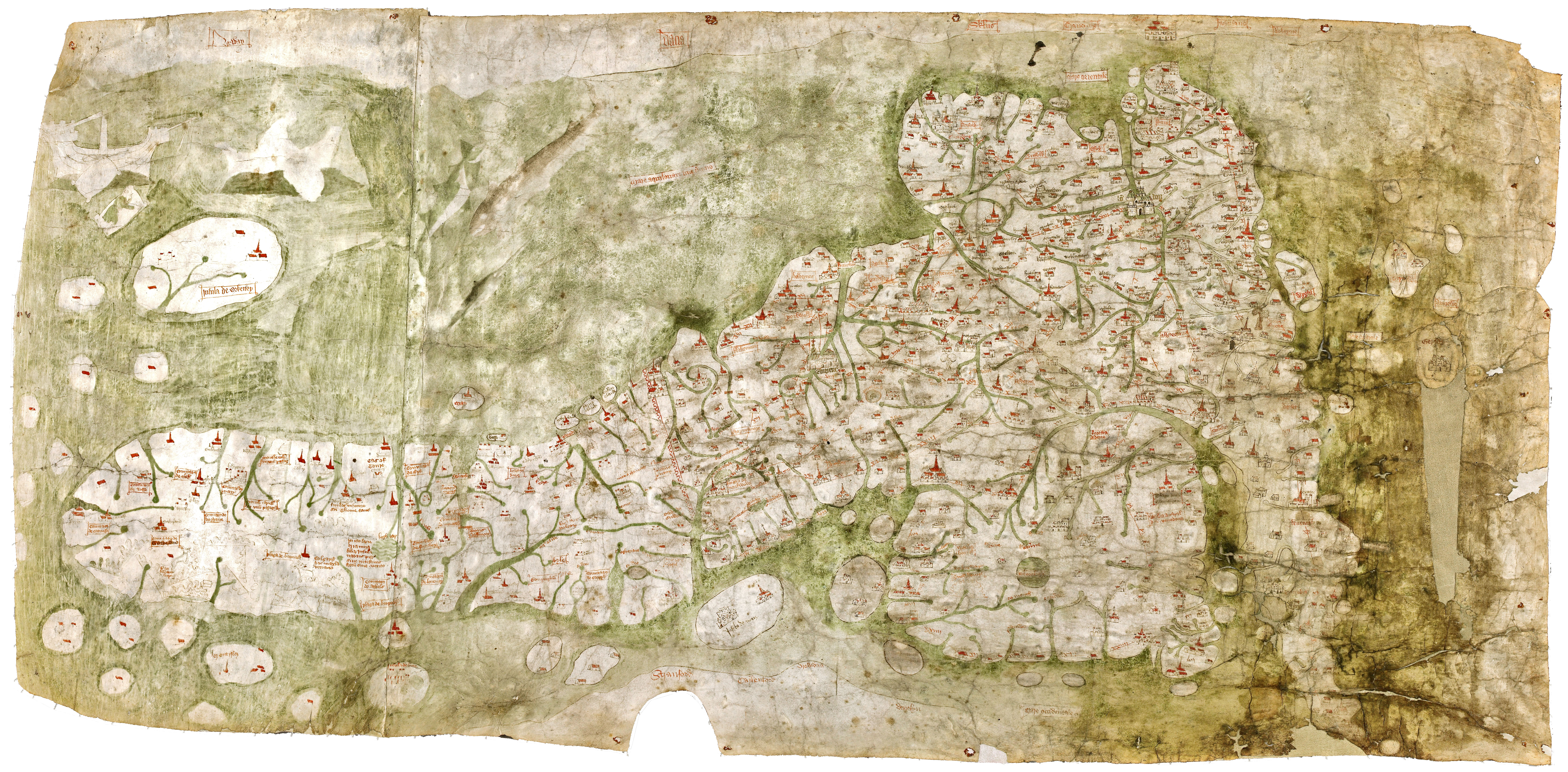
The Gough Map. North lies to the left of the map.

Facsimile of the Gough Map by the Ordnance Survey. First published in 1870, the red transcriptions of ancient names were added in the 1935 edition

The Gough Map or Bodleian Map is a Late Medieval map of the island of Great Britain. Its precise dates of production and authorship are unknown. It is named after Richard Gough, who bequeathed the map to the Bodleian Library in Oxford 1809. He acquired the map from the estate of the antiquarian Thomas "Honest Tom" Martin in 1774. Numerous copies of it have been made, with an interactive online version created at Queen's University, Belfast. It measures 115 by 56 cm.

== Date ==
There has been no authoritative date for the map's production. Thomas Martin believed it dated from the reign of Edward III, while 19th-century scholarship suggested a date of c. 1300, during the reign of Edward I. More recently, the map was believed to have been made within an eleven-year window, based on historical changes of place names and sizes. The earliest given date is deduced by the depiction of a city wall around Coventry, which was first constructed in 1355. The latter date is usually given as 1366, the year in which the town marked on the map as Sheppey was renamed Queenborough.

Most recent studies, based on handwriting and stylistic evidence, support a later period of production. One study concludes that the map must have been made in the early years of the fifteenth century, while another suggests that the map was produced in the 1370s but extensively revised, perhaps as late as 1430.

It is generally accepted that the map may have been conceived earlier, and that it could have been one of several similar copies. In particular, it has been argued that some of the information on the map reflects the interests of Edward I, dating the prototype to around 1280.

== Authorship ==
The map's authorship is also unknown. It is thought that much of the information about the map was gained from either one or more men who travelled around Great Britain as part of Edward I's military expeditions into Wales and Scotland. The areas of the map's fringe with the most accurate detail often correspond with those areas in which Edward's troops were present. The accuracy of the map in the South Yorkshire and Lincolnshire areas suggest that the author could be from this region. However, it is also possible that the map was constructed based upon the collation of various people's local knowledge. For example, the cartographic accuracy in Oxfordshire could be explained by the fact that William Rede, Fellow of Merton College, had successfully calculated the geographic coordinates for Oxford in 1340.

== Topography and accuracy ==
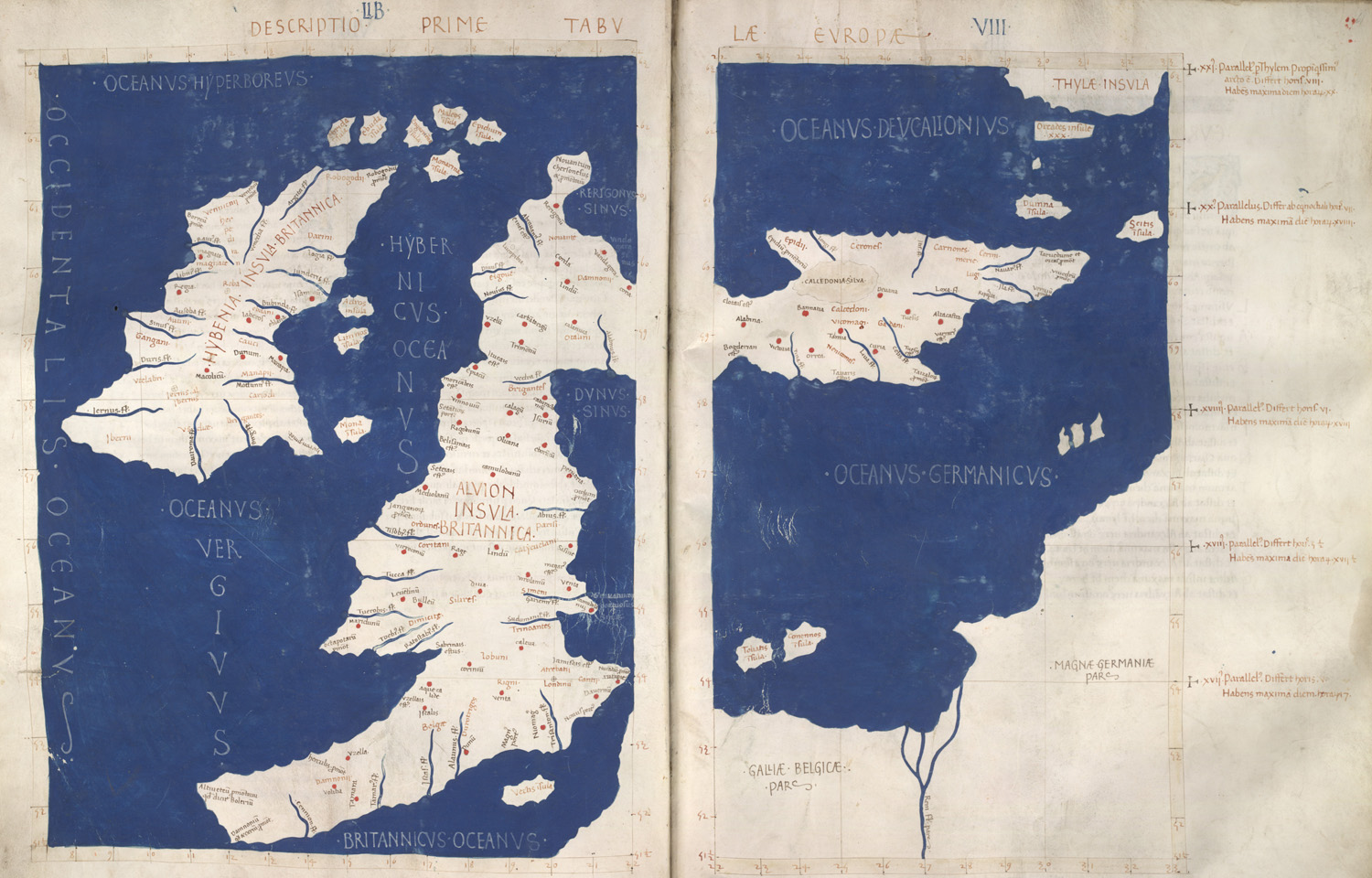
15th C. map of the British Isles based on Ptolemy's 2nd C. map

The Gough Map is important due to its break with previous theologically based mapping. Apart from the Tabula Peutingeriana, its depiction of routes and marked distances is unique in British maps before the 17th century. And compared to previously known maps, like Ptolemy's Geography, it greatly improves the detail on the coast of England and Wales, although its depiction of the then independent Kingdom of Scotland is very poor. Towns are shown in some detail, with London and York written in gold lettering and other principal settlements illustrated in detail. Despite its accuracy, the map does contain a number of other errors. Notably, islands and lakes such as Anglesey and Windermere are oversized, whilst the strategic importance of rivers is shown by their emphasis. Well known but geographically small features such as the Peninsula in Durham are also overly-prominent. The map contains numerous references to mythology as if they were geographical fact, as illustrated by comments about Brutus' mythical landings in Devon. Nevertheless, it remains the most accurate map of Britain prior to the 16th century.

=== The red lines ===
A notable feature of the Gough Map is the disjointed network, across much of England and Wales, of narrow red lines drawn between settlements. With few exceptions, each is marked with a distance (of an unknown unit) in Roman numerals. Richard Gough described these lines as 'roads', and that description held throughout the 19th and 20th centuries. Indeed, the document is still often referred to as a 'road map of Britain'. In a change of emphasis, however, recent scholarship sees the lines as routes, or as graphic representations of distance rather than of physical roads.

Scholars have struggled to explain the idiosyncratic inclusions and omissions. For example, there are no routes from London towards the south or east, and large sections of Watling Street are omitted. It has been speculated that the selection of routes might reflect the movements or interests of the map's owner, or that the compiler chose to show only the routes for which he had recorded distances, from existing itineraries. In any case, as the route network neither covers the whole of the map nor shows all the principal routes, it could not have served as a wayfinding aid in the sense that the term 'road map' implies. The lines are generally considered to be a secondary feature – even an afterthought – on a map principally of settlements.

== Recent research ==
In 2012 an interdisciplinary team convened to take a new look at the Gough map. Their task was to re-evaluate the existing, often contradictory, literatures with the aid of newly-available high resolution scans and spectral imaging techniques. The team reported its findings at a work-in-progress Symposium in 2015 at the Bodleian Library, and a summary of provisional findings was published in 2017. These qualify much that has hitherto been believed about the map. Most significantly, it is proposed that the extant cartographical image is not a single map, but an accumulation of three distinct layers: Layer One (1390-1410) showing the whole of Britain; Layer Two (first quarter 15th century) comprising England south of the Wall and Wales; Layer Three (last quarter 15th century) restricted to south-east and south-central England. The last two layers in particular are individualised by systematic re-inkings, additions of colour and other details and alterations to place-names.

A study of the pinholes was undertaken. The holes occur in groups, marking the shapes of many of the pictorial town signs across the map – though the holes are absent from Kent, East Anglia, and the southwest. Some of the pricked outlines have no corresponding ink line, and in some places the group of holes is offset from the inked sign. This has led to the conclusion that the holes are most likely medieval in origin, and were made while copying onto the map during its first production, rather than while copying from it. Hitherto they were thought to have been part of the copying process for the creation of the facsimile for Gough's British Topography.

Traditional conclusions about other aspects of the map were revised, including many transcriptions of place-names and the identification of some places represented on the map. New discoveries have also been made about the subsequent history of the map. Grey stains over many of the place names have been found to be caused by a reagent (made from oak galls and Madeira wine) applied at Richard Gough's request, that he had hoped would make faded writing more legible. On-going research extends the number of regional case studies already carried out (Northwest England, North Norfolk coast).

=== Cantre'r Gwaelod ===
In 2022, geographer Simon Haslett and linguist David Willis published research suggesting that two offshore islands depicted in Cardigan Bay which were thought to be phantom islands were extant at the time of the map's creation, and evidence for the Cantre'r Gwaelod legend of Welsh Mythology.

As well as the Gough map, the research used historical sources and geological evidence from the Welsh coast and seabed to model the evolution of the coast since the Last Glacial Period. The study found that the two islands were likely to have existed at the time of the maps creation, and were the last remnants of a larger low-lying landscape created by glacial deposits before the two islands eventually disappeared by the sixteenth century.

== The Gough Map in culture ==
A BBC television series In Search of Medieval Britain (2008) showed Alixe Bovey retracing a series of journeys through Britain in the Middle Ages using the Gough Map.

In May 2011, the Gough Map was inscribed in UNESCO's UK Memory of the World Register.

== Online digitization ==
From April 2010 to July 2011 a research project funded by the UK AHRC Research Council's Beyond Text programme digitised and created a new online edition of the Gough Map. The edition was a collaboration between Keith Lilley at Queen's University Belfast, Nick Millea at the University of Oxford's Bodleian Library Map Room, and Paul Vetch at the Department of Digital Humanities at King's College London.
