= Feu (land tenure) =

Previously common form of land tenure in Scotland

Feu was long the most common form of land tenure in Scotland. Conveyancing in Scots law was dominated by forms which were called feudal until the Scottish Parliament passed the Abolition of Feudal Tenure etc. (Scotland) Act 2000. (Note: Section 1: "The feudal system of land tenure, that is to say the entire system whereby land is held by a vassal on perpetual tenure from a superior is, on the appointed day, abolished") The word is the Scots variant of fief, connected etymologically also to fee. Originally a feuholding, or fief, was land tenure given by a feudal superior in return for military service. (Note: "FEU: (Scots Law) A free and gratuitous right to lands made to one for service to be performed by him; a tenure where the vassal, in place of military services, makes a return in grain or in money.") The English had in 1660 abolished these tenures, with An Act Taking Away the Court of Wards ..., since 1948 known as the Tenures Abolition Act 1660.

== History ==
Duplicands of Feu-duties (Scotland) Act 1920 (Note: Section 1.)
- Act of Parliament
- Parliament of the United Kingdom
- Long title: An Act to amend the law relating to the payment of duplicands of feu-duties in Scotland.
- Citation: 10 & 11 Geo. 5. c. 34
- Territorial extent: United Kingdom

Dates
- Royal assent: 16 August 1920
- Commencement: 16 August 1920 (Note: The Acts of Parliament (Commencement) Act 1793.)
- Repealed: 28 November 2004 (Note: The Abolition of Feudal Tenure etc. (Scotland) Act 2000 (Commencement No. 2) (Appointed Day) Order 2003 (SSI 2003/456).)
Other legislation
Amends	Feudal Casualties (Scotland) Act 1914
Repealed by	Abolition of Feudal Tenure etc. (Scotland) Act 2000

Status: Repealed

Text of statute as originally enacted

Revised text of statute as amended

Before 1832, only the vassals of the Crown had votes in parliamentary elections for the Scots counties. This favoured subinfeudation as opposed to outright sale of land. This was changed by the Scottish Reform Act 1832, which increased the franchise of males in Scotland from 4,500 to 64,447. (Note: "The first Reform Act has increased the electorate of Scotland fourteen-fold from 4,500 to 64,447. The number of adult males who can vote is one in eight, compared to one in five in England, and one in 125 in Scotland before the Reform Act. Scotland's representation rises from 45 to 53")

In the Orkney and Shetland islands, land is still largely possessed as udal property, a holding derived or handed down from the time when these islands belonged to Norway. (Note: "Ancient Norse Udal land rights are still valid in the islands - very much so. In the 19th century the Chancellor of the Exchequer came up against Udal law and lost.") Such lands could previously be converted into feus at the will of the proprietor and held from the Crown or the Marquess of Zetland.

At one time, the system of conveyancing by which the transfer of feus was effected was curious and complicated by requiring the presence of parties on the land itself and the symbolic transfer of the property (for example, by throwing a shoe onto the earth of the property transferred) (Note: For a similar action, see Book of Ruth 4:17 (KJV): "Now this was the manner in former time in Israel concerning redeeming and concerning changing, for to confirm all things; a man plucked off his shoe, and gave it to his neighbour: and this was a testimony in Israel".) together with the registration of various documents. However, legislation since the mid-19th century has changed all of that.

Various reforms were attempted before feu was eventually abolished by the Abolition of Feudal Tenure etc. (Scotland) Act 2000.

In feu holding, there was an annual payment in money or in kind, (usually moderate, and since it was fixed, eroding in value due to inflation over the decades) in return for the enjoyment of the land. The Crown is the first overlord or superior, and land is held of it by crown vassals. They, in turn, may feu their land to others, who become their vassals, and the former are mediate overlords or superiors. The process of sub-infeudation may be repeated to an indefinite extent. The Conveyancing (Scotland) Act 1874 rendered any clause in a disposition against subinfeudation null and void.

Casualties, which are a feature of land held in feu, are certain payments made to the superior that are contingent on the happening of certain events. The most important was the payment of an amount equal to one year's feu-duty by a new holder, whether heir or purchaser of the feu. The Conveyancing (Scotland) Act abolished casualties in all feus after that date, and power was given to redeem that burden on feus already existing. If the vassal does not pay the feu-duty for two years, the superior, among other remedies, may obtain by legal process a decree of irritancy, whereupon tinsel or forfeiture of the feu follows.

== Other types of Scots feudal tenure ==
There have been other forms of tenure:

1. Booking is a conveyance peculiar to the burgh of Paisley but does not differ essentially from feu. (Note: "Booking, tenure of, system of land tenure in Paisley burgh necessitating an entry on the burgh register")
2. Burgage is the system by which land is held in Royal Burghs. (Note: "Burgage, burgh law. 2. form of tenure under which land in a royal burgh is held by the king (or the land itself)")
3. Blench holding is by a nominal payment, as of a penny Scots, or a red rose, often only to be rendered upon demand. (Note: "Blench Ferme (also blench-duty), mode of land-tenure, a nominal or peppercorn rent; cp. Blanch rent, or Free blench. Blench holding, the holding of land under this system of tenure")
4. Mortification, an ecclesiastical or other charitable holding in which tenure is granted ad manum mortuum, that is, inalienably and in forfeiture of all the normal superiors' casualties
5. Ward, the original military holding, was abolished in 1747 (20 Geo. 2. c. 20), as an effect of the rising of 1745. (Note: "Ward, (waird), feudal land tenure rights conferred through military service obligations of tenants.")

== See also ==
- Fee simple
- Fee tail
- Feoffee
- Trespass for mesne profits
