= Thirlage =

Legal concept in Scottish feudal law

Thirlage was a feudal servitude (or astriction) under Scots law restricting manorial tenants in the milling of their grain for personal or other uses. Vassals in a feudal barony were thirled to their local mill owned by the feudal superior. People so thirled were called suckeners and were obliged to pay customary dues for use of the mill and help maintain it.

== Background ==
The term thirlage is a metathesis of Scots thrillage 'thralldom', derived from thril 'thrall', which was a body servant, retainer, or vassal to a noble or chief. The term is interchangeable with Scots carl (or English churl) and indicates subservience to the feudal superior and feudal laws, the situation being not that far removed from the conditions of slavery.

The obligations of thirlage eventually ceased to apply, but thirlage in Scotland was only formally and totally abolished on 28 November (Martinmas) 2004 by the Abolition of Feudal Tenure etc. (Scotland) Act 2000.

An identical feudal astriction existed and was enforced actively in feudal western Europe, e.g. mill soke in England, banalité du moulin in France, banmolen in the Netherlands, Mühlenzwang in Germany.

Thirlage was the feudal law by which the laird (superior) could force all those vassals living on his lands to bring their grain to his mill to be ground. The law ensured that all the grain the vassals produced could be measured and thus taxed. Vassals had to carry out repairs on the mill, maintaining the lade and weir as well as conveying new millstones to the site. Such trees as beech and particularly hornbeam were grown as a crop to provide the necessary wood for the mill machinery.

The Thirlage Act was repealed by the Thirlage Act 1799 (39 Geo. 3. c. 55) and after this many mills fell out of use as competition and unsubsidised running costs took their toll. This explains why so many mills ceased to be marked on maps after this date. Lambroch Mill for example was on the Annick Water near Stewarton in Ayrshire and apart from the weir and some other indications, it has entirely vanished, most likely because it was the thirlage mill for Lambroughton and its business went to Lainshaw or Cunninghamhead mill after the Thirlage Act was repealed.

== Sucken ==
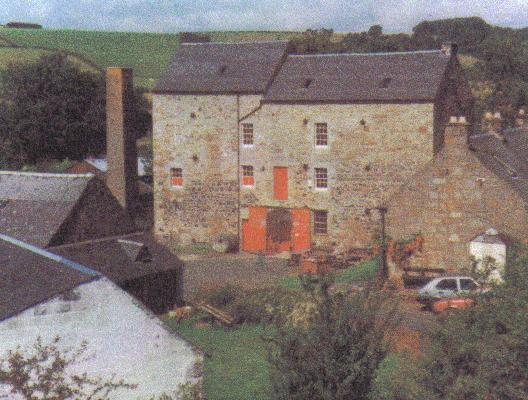
Dalgarven Mill was previously thirled to the Blair Estate in North Ayrshire.

The 'sucken' was the area over which a mill held thirlage over tenants and a 'suckener' (or 'in-sucken multurer') was a tenant thirled to a particular mill. The millers were obliged to enforce the adherence of tenants to the thirlage laws, since the income of the miller was based on that portion of the tenants' grain that the miller was legally entitled to take for the act of milling the grain. The legal term 'astricted' was applied to a tenant who was thirled or bonded to a particular mill. The term outsucken was applied to a mill which ground corn from outside its sucken for whatever reason.

== Multure ==
Multure (or mulcture), pronounced 'mooter', was the name for the mill toll: a fixed proportion of the tenant's grain, paid to the miller by the suckener to grind the corn. The term 'dry multure' was often used, indicating the multure that a tenant had to pay, whether the grain was to be ground or not. Failure to take grain to the thirled mill was termed 'abstracted multure' and could result in the suckener being fined. The term 'bannock' denoted the payment to a miller's servant amounting to a handful of meal, in addition to that given as knaveship, this being a handful of cereal from each load milled. After the abolition of thirlage the term 'lick of goodwill' or 'lock' was the term for the miller's payment for grinding the cereal, etc.

Aiton records in 1811 that barley, wheat, peas, beans, and every form of green crop were exempt from multure.

== Grassum ==
This was the payment, amounting to a year's rent, for a miller to enter into rights under the law of thirlage. This was a significant sum, and the miller was often forced to insist on his rights of multure to make a reasonable living. By 1811 grassum was almost unknown in Ayrshire.

== Dishonesty ==
The Scots term mill-bitch was used for a bag hung near the millstones into which a dishonest miller would slip a handful of meal now and then. The 'mill-ring' is the space between the millstones and the wooden frame. This space inevitably collected meal and was enlarged by unscrupulous millers to increase the amount that accumulated to their benefit. The term 'ring the mill' was used in common discourse to mean a 'cheat'.

== Quern-stones ==
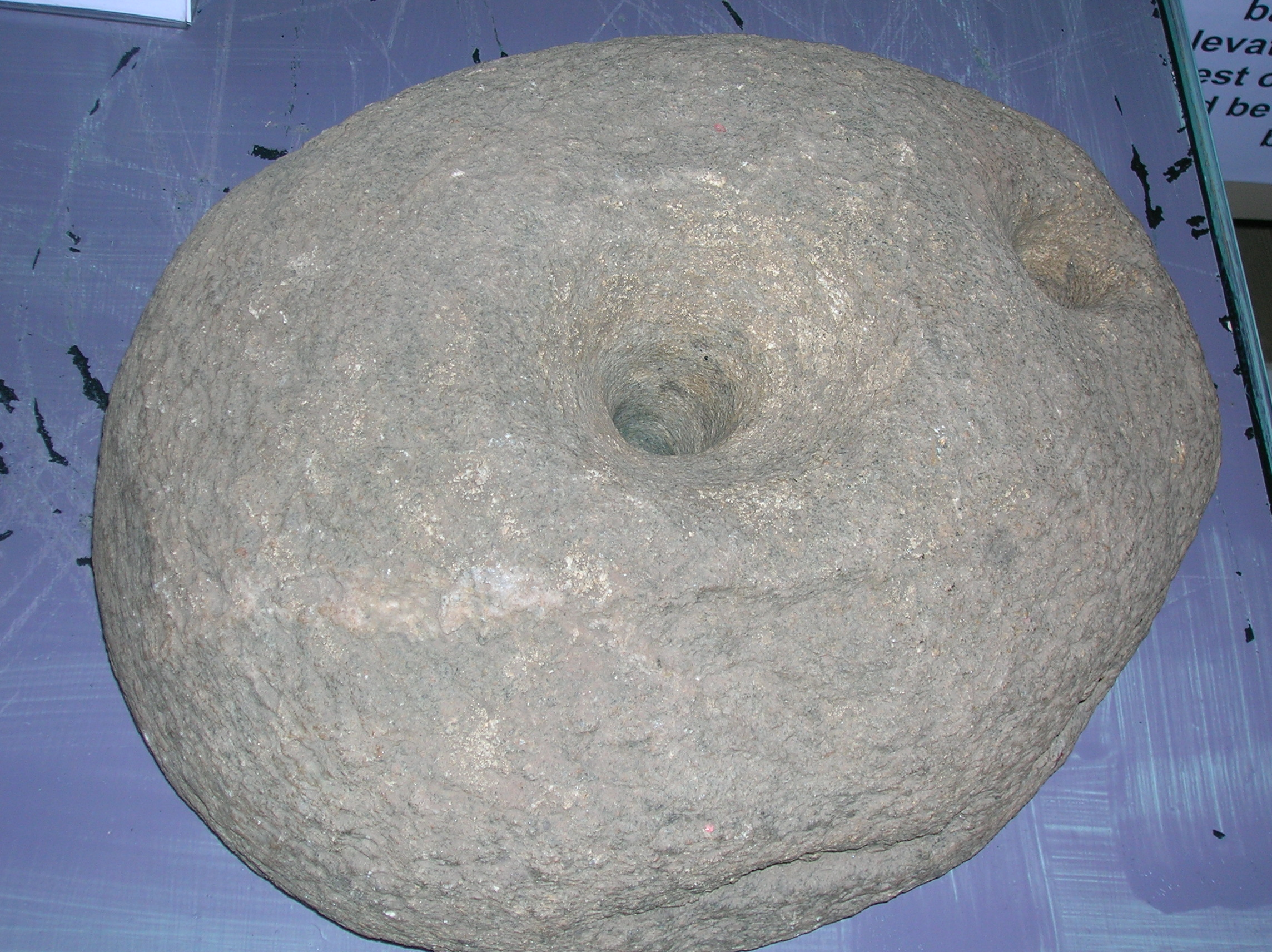
The upper stone of a Scottish hand quern from Dalgarven Mill, North Ayrshire

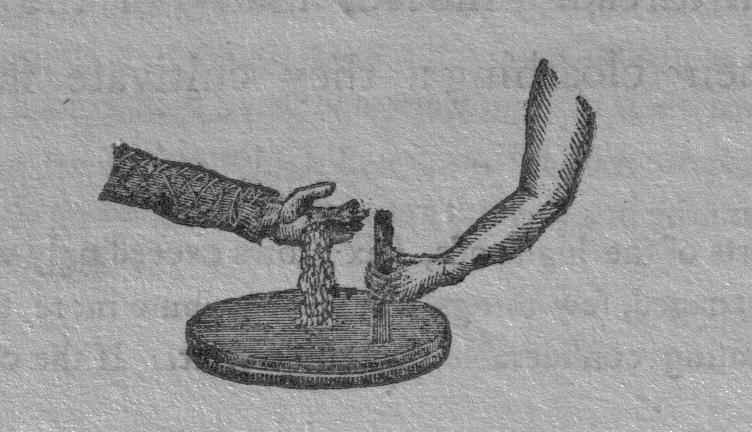
A hand quern being operated

Early Scottish multurers' duty to use their baron's mill could be legally enforced by the miller breaking quern-stones. Querns allow free grinding at home to gain independence from thirlage. Many quern-stones were intentionally broken. This is maybe after having been broken purposely according to thirlage law. However, there are various ceremonial explanations.

== Thirlage Act 1799 ==
Thirlage Act 1799 (Note: The citation of this act by this short title was authorised by section 1 of, and the first schedule to, the Short Titles Act 1896. Due to the repeal of those provisions it is now authorised by section 19(2) of the Interpretation Act 1978.)
- Act of Parliament
- Parliament of Great Britain
- Long title: An Act for encouraging the improvement of lands subject to the servitude of thirlage in that part of Great Britain called Scotland.
- Citation: 39 Geo. 3. c. 55
- Territorial extent: Scotland (Note: Preamble.)

Dates
- Royal assent: 13 June 1799
- Commencement: 13 June 1799 (Note: The Acts of Parliament (Commencement) Act 1793.)
- Repealed: 28 November 2004 (Note: The Abolition of Feudal Tenure etc. (Scotland) Act 2000 (Commencement No. 2) (Appointed Day) Order 2003 (SSI 2003/456).)
Other legislation
Amended by	Statute Law Revision Act 1888; Statute Law Revision Act 1893; Conveyancing (Scotland) Act 1924; Statute Law Revision Act 1948; Land Registration (Scotland) Act 1979
Repealed by	Abolition of Feudal Tenure etc. (Scotland) Act 2000

Status: Repealed

Text of statute as originally enacted

The Thirlage Act 1799 (39 Geo. 3. c. 55) allowed those suckeners bound by thirlage to make a one-off payment that 'bought' them out of the various legal requirements:

And whereas there is a kind of thirlage known in the law and practice of Scotland, called a thirlage of the invecta et illata, to which sundry towns, burghs, burghs of barony, villages or other places in that part of the kingdom and the inhabitants thereof are subject, which thirlage it is expedient to allow to be purchased by the persons subject to the same: Be it therefore enacted, that if any inhabitant or inhabitants of such town, burgh, village or place, shall be desirous to purchase an exemption from the said servitude of thirlage, and all and every the services and prestations incident thereto, to which the whole town, burgh, village or place is liable, from the proprietor of such mill or mills entitled to the same, it shall be lawful and competent to them to apply in manner above mentioned to the sheriff or steward depute of the county in which such town, burgh, village or place is situate, who shall take such proceedings and summon a jury in such manner as is herein-before particularly directed, which jury shall by their verdict fix and determine the full value in money of such right of thirlage in perpetuity; on which verdict and determination the said sheriff or steward depute or substitute shall pronounce decreet against the person or persons so petitioning or applying to him as aforesaid for the sum so fixed and determined by such jury; on payment of which to the proprietor of the mill, such town, burgh, village or place, or such inhabitant or inhabitants thereof, formerly subject to such thirlage, shall thenceforth be for ever freed and relieved from the same.

Section 55 of the Abolition of Feudal Tenure etc. (Scotland) Act 2000 abolished the last vestiges of thirlage as of 28 November 2004.

== Transporting millstones ==
Under thirlage the suckeners had to convey new millstones to their thirled mill, sometimes over significant distances. The width of some of the first roads was determined by the requirement to have at least two people on either side of a new grindstone being transported, with a wooden axle called a 'mill-wand' passed through the hole in the centre.

== Aid to the poor ==
Suckeners would place a small amount of grain in a bag at the mill which would be used to help feed the poor or those suffering hard times.

== See also ==
- Museum of Ayrshire Country Life and Costume
