= Udal law =

Legal system of Shetland and Orkney

Udal law is a Norse-derived legal system, found in Shetland and Orkney in Scotland, and in Manx law in the Isle of Man. It is closely related to Odelsrett; both terms are from Proto-Germanic *Ōþalan, meaning "heritage; inheritance".

== History ==
Udal law was codified by the Norwegian kings Magnus I and Magnus VI. The Treaty of Perth transferred the Outer Hebrides and Isle of Man to Scots law, while Norse law and rule still applied for Shetland and Orkney.

The courts of Scotland have intermittently acknowledged the supremacy of udal law in property cases up to the present day. Major differences from Scots law include shore ownership rights, important for pipelines and buried cables.

Udal law generally holds sway in Shetland and Orkney, along with Scots law.

== Description ==
Udal Tenure Act 1690 (Note: The citation of this act by this short title was authorised by section 2 of, and schedule 2 to, the Statute Law Revision (Scotland) Act 1964.)
- Act of Parliament
- Parliament of Scotland
- Long title: Act in favours of the small vassalls of Kirklands who now hold of their Majesties.
- Citation: April 1690 c. 61 [12mo ed: c. 32]
- Territorial extent: Scotland

Dates
- Royal assent: 19 July 1690
- Commencement: 15 April 1690 (Note: Start of session.)
- Repealed: 28 November 2004 (Note: The Abolition of Feudal Tenure etc. (Scotland) Act 2000 (Commencement No. 2) (Appointed Day) Order 2003 (SSI 2003/456).)
Other legislation
Amended by	Statute Law Revision (Scotland) Act 1906
Repealed by	Abolition of Feudal Tenure etc. (Scotland) Act 2000

Status: Repealed

Revised text of statute as amended

Text of the Udal Tenure Act 1690 as in force today (including any amendments) within the United Kingdom, from legislation.gov.uk.

Not all land in Shetland and Orkney can be described as falling under udal tenure. The type of tenure depends on how the title arose:

1. Unwritten udal title, while rare, does exist, for udal law did not require written title deeds.
2. Recorded udal titles, as entered in the Sasine Register, provide proof by prescription for the purposes of the Prescription and Limitation (Scotland) Act 1973.
3. Some udal proprietors resigned their lands to the Crown in exchange for a grant of feudal title to the dominium utile, thus removing the land from udal law.
4. Where some feu dispositions arose in quasi-feudal circumstances, such as sales under the right to buy legislation with respect to council houses, the terms of the relevant deed will govern which tenure applies.

The udal tenant held without charter by uninterrupted possession on payment to the Crown, the kirk, or a grantee from the Crown of a tribute called skat (Norwegian: skatt), now meaning "tax". This is cognate with the English term scot, which referred to a similar payment), or without such payment, the latter right being more strictly the udal right. They were convertible into feus at the option of the udallers. Succession law had unique traits, as the eldest son inherited the father's main residence, while the rest of the property was shared among siblings, daughters inheriting half as much as sons.

Several significant aspects of udal law are not seen elsewhere in the UK:

1. While in the rest of Britain ownership of land extends only to the high water mark (where the Crown is deemed to own what lies below it), in Orkney and Shetland it extends to the lowest astronomical tide. This caused complications during the development of the North Sea oilfields, for builders of pipelines needed permission from the foreshore owners in order to proceed with their work. Under the Land Registration etc. (Scotland) Act 2012, entry of title onto the Land Register of Scotland must include a cadastral plan, but the foreshore on such plans needs only to be drawn at the mean low water mark of ordinary spring tides. Where udal title exists, an appropriate note must be inserted on the plan to indicate that title extends to the lowest ebb.
2. Swans, which are the property of the Crown elsewhere in the UK, are the property of the people in Orkney and Shetland.

== Modern land reform ==
The Abolition of Feudal Tenure etc. (Scotland) Act 2000 extinguished any remaining obligations to pay skat (ignoring whatever vestigial or forgotten laws not in effect), effective 28 November 2004. In addition, the Land Registration (Scotland) Act 1979 (as amended by the Title Conditions (Scotland) Act 2003) provides that, as of 1 April 2003, first registration will be required on any transfer of an interest in udal tenure that had not previously been entered in the Land Register, as real rights can only be obtained by registration.

== See also ==
- Norn language
- Allodial title
- Ancient Norwegian property laws
- Odal (rune)
