= List of acts of the Parliament of Scotland from 1597 =

This is a list of acts of the Parliament of Scotland for the year 1597.

It lists acts of Parliament of the old Parliament of Scotland, that was merged with the old Parliament of England to form the Parliament of Great Britain, by the Union with England Act 1707 (c. 7).

For other years, see list of acts of the Parliament of Scotland. For the period after 1707, see list of acts of the Parliament of Great Britain.

== 1597 ==
The 15th parliament of James VI, which met in Edinburgh from 1 November 1597.

Short title, or popular name	Citation	Royal assent
Long title
Not public and general	1597 c. 1 (Note: This is the citation in the Record Edition.) — (Note: This act is not listed in the Duodecimal Edition.)	16 December 1597
Reductioun of the foirfaltries of the erlis of Anguis Huntlie and Erroll.
Prelates in Parliament Act 1597 (repealed)	1597 c. 2; 1597 c. 235 (Note: This is the citation in the Duodecimal Edition.)	16 December 1597
All ministeris provydit to prelaceis suld haif voit in parliament. (Repealed by Statute Law Revision (Scotland) Act 1906 (6 Edw. 7. c. 38))
Kirk Dykes Act 1597 still in force	1597 c. 3; 1597 c. 232	16 December 1597
Kirkyard dyikis suld be biggit.
Crown Lands Act 1597 (repealed)	1597 c. 4; 1597 c. 233	16 December 1597
Alienatioun of the Kingis annexit propertie. (Repealed by Statute Law Revision (Scotland) Act 1906 (6 Edw. 7. c. 38))
Not public and general	1597 c. 5; 1597 c. 234	16 December 1597
The annexit propertie may nocht be disponit bot in fewferme allanerlie.
Not public and general	1597 c. 6; 1597 c. 235	16 December 1597
Anent dispositioun of the Kingis castellis and certane utheris partis of the annexit propertie.
Not public and general	1597 c. 7; 1597 c. 236	16 December 1597
Dispositiounis of the annexit propertie maid befoir the dissolutioun or nocht conform to the conditionis thairofar null.
Assyis Hering Act 1597 (repealed)	1597 c. 8; 1597 c. 241	16 December 1597
Assyis hering may nocht be disponit. (Repealed by Statute Law Revision (Scotland) Act 1906 (6 Edw. 7. c. 38))
Heritable Chamberlains Act 1597 (repealed)	1597 c. 9; 1597 c. 242	16 December 1597
Anent heretable chalmerlanreis and dispositionis of the propertie. (Repealed by Statute Law Revision (Scotland) Act 1906 (6 Edw. 7. c. 38))
Feu-duties Act 1597 (repealed)	1597 c. 10; 1597 c. 243	16 December 1597
Alienatio feudifirme feudifirmarum. (Repealed by Statute Law Revision (Scotland) Act 1906 (6 Edw. 7. c. 38))
Tacks and Pensions of Thirds Act 1597 (repealed)	1597 c. 11; 1597 c. 244	16 December 1597
Anent takis and pensionis gevin furthe of thriddis. (Repealed by Statute Law Revision (Scotland) Act 1906 (6 Edw. 7. c. 38))
Thirds of Benefices Act 1597 (repealed)	1597 c. 12; 1597 c. 245	16 December 1597
Anent thriddis of beneficis common kirkis frierlandis rentis and beneficis of cuir under prelaceis. (Repealed by Statute Law Revision (Scotland) Act 1906 (6 Edw. 7. c. 38))
Benefices Act 1597 (repealed)	1597 c. 13; 1597 c. 246	16 December 1597
The twa part of the beneficis vacand sall appertene to the King. (Repealed by Statute Law Revision (Scotland) Act 1906 (6 Edw. 7. c. 38))
Ratifications Act 1597 (repealed)	1597 c. 14; 1597 c. 247	16 December 1597
Anent ratificationis and dispositionis maid in Parliament. (Repealed by Statute Law Revision (Scotland) Act 1906 (6 Edw. 7. c. 38))
Possessors of Benefices Act 1597 (repealed)	1597 c. 15; 1597 c. 248	16 December 1597
Ministeris and possessouris of beneficis sall gif up the rentell of the temporalitie. (Repealed by Statute Law Revision (Scotland) Act 1906 (6 Edw. 7. c. 38))
Feuars of Temporalities Act 1597 (repealed)	1597 c. 16; 1597 c. 249	16 December 1597
The fewaris of the temporalitie sall gif up ane rentell of thair dewteis. (Repealed by Statute Law Revision (Scotland) Act 1906 (6 Edw. 7. c. 38))
Feu-duty Act 1597 (repealed)	1597 c. 17; 1597 c. 250	16 December 1597
All fewis may be decernit null ffor nocht payment of the dewtie albeit na provisioun be maid thairanent in the infeftment. (Repealed by Abolition of Feudal Tenure etc. (Scotland) Act 2000 (asp 5))
Usary Act 1597 (repealed)	1597 c. 18; 1597 c. 251	16 December 1597
It is nocht lesum to tak mair annuelrent or proffeit nor ten for the hundrethe. (Repealed by Statute Law Revision (Scotland) Act 1906 (6 Edw. 7. c. 38))
Firearms Act 1597 (repealed)	1597 c. 19; 1597 c. 252	16 December 1597
The pane of beraris usaris or schutaris with pistolettes culveringis daggis or ingynis of fyre wark. (Repealed by Statute Law Revision (Scotland) Act 1906 (6 Edw. 7. c. 38))
Gold and Silver Act 1597 (repealed)	1597 c. 20; 1597 c. 253	16 December 1597
The pricis of gold and silver of forene cun yie and bulyeoun. (Repealed by Statute Law Revision (Scotland) Act 1906 (6 Edw. 7. c. 38))
Wool Act 1597 (repealed)	1597 c. 21; 1597 c. 254	16 December 1597
Woll suld nocht be transportit furthe of the realme. (Repealed by Statute Law Revision (Scotland) Act 1906 (6 Edw. 7. c. 38))
Customs Act 1597 (repealed)	1597 c. 22; 1597 c. 255	16 December 1597
All merchandeice brocht within this realme suld pay custome. (Repealed by Statute Law Revision (Scotland) Act 1906 (6 Edw. 7. c. 38))
Woollen Goods Act 1597 (repealed)	1597 c. 23; 1597 c. 256	16 December 1597
Englishe claithe and utheris Englishe merchandice maid of woll is forbiddin. (Repealed by Statute Law Revision (Scotland) Act 1906 (6 Edw. 7. c. 38))
Coal Act 1597 (repealed)	1597 c. 24; 1597 c. 257	16 December 1597
Great burne coill suld nocht be transportit furthe of this realme. (Repealed by Statute Law Revision (Scotland) Act 1906 (6 Edw. 7. c. 38))
Customs (No. 2) Act 1597 (repealed)	1597 c. 25; 1597 c. 258	16 December 1597
Forbiddin guidis suld pay custume. (Repealed by Statute Law Revision (Scotland) Act 1906 (6 Edw. 7. c. 38))
Cocquets Act 1597 (repealed)	1597 c. 26; 1597 c. 259	16 December 1597
All cocquettis suld be speciall and contene the particular kyndis of merchandice. (Repealed by Statute Law Revision (Scotland) Act 1906 (6 Edw. 7. c. 38))
Shipping Act 1597 (repealed)	1597 c. 27; 1597 c. 260	16 December 1597
All schippiɛ suld haif ane sufficient cocquett. (Repealed by Statute Law Revision (Scotland) Act 1906 (6 Edw. 7. c. 38))
Foreign Trade Act 1597 (repealed)	1597 c. 28; 1597 c. 261	16 December 1597
The aithe of the merchandis shipperis and factoris passand to and fra the law countreis and furthe of this realme. (Repealed by Statute Law Revision (Scotland) Act 1906 (6 Edw. 7. c. 38))
Imports Act 1597 (repealed)	1597 c. 29; 1597 c. 262	16 December 1597
All schippis and mercheandis suld land at the ordinar staple. (Repealed by Statute Law Revision (Scotland) Act 1906 (6 Edw. 7. c. 38))
Usury (No. 2) Act 1597 (repealed)	1597 c. 30; 1597 c. 263	16 December 1597
The conservatour suld puneish usureris. (Repealed by Statute Law Revision (Scotland) Act 1906 (6 Edw. 7. c. 38))
Foreign Trade (No. 2) Act 1597 (repealed)	1597 c. 31; 1597 c. 264	16 December 1597
All mercheandis sall gif ane inventare of thair mercheandice and gudis to the conservatour. (Repealed by Statute Law Revision (Scotland) Act 1906 (6 Edw. 7. c. 38))
Salmon Act 1597 (repealed)	1597 c. 32; 1597 c. 265	16 December 1597
Of slayaris of reidfish smoltis frie and salmond in forbiddin tyme. (Repealed by Statute Law Revision (Scotland) Act 1906 (6 Edw. 7. c. 38))
Titles to Land Act 1597 (repealed)	1597 c. 33; 1597 c. 266	16 December 1597
The inhabitantis of the iles and helandis suld schaw thair haldingis. (Repealed by Statute Law Revision (Scotland) Act 1906 (6 Edw. 7. c. 38))
Burghs Act 1597 (repealed)	1597 c. 34; 1597 c. 267	16 December 1597
Anent the bigging of burrowes townis in the ilis and bielandis. (Repealed by Statute Law Revision (Scotland) Act 1906 (6 Edw. 7. c. 38))
Registration of Hornings Act 1597 (repealed)	1597 c. 35; 1597 c. 268	16 December 1597
Lettiris of horning inhibitionis interdictionis and publicatioun thairof aganis personis duelland within bailliereis suld be registrat in the baillies bukis, (Repealed by Statute Law Revision (Scotland) Act 1906 (6 Edw. 7. c. 38))
Registration of Hornings (No. 2) Act 1597 (repealed)	1597 c. 36; 1597 c. 269	16 December 1597
Registratioun of letteris of horning relaxationis executionis inhibitionis suld be maid judiciallie or befoir ane notar and four witnessis Of the judge refusand the registratioun. (Repealed by Statute Law Revision (Scotland) Act 1906 (6 Edw. 7. c. 38))
Game Act 1597 (repealed)	1597 c. 37; 1597 c. 270	16 December 1597
It is not lesum to slay deir rais hares wylde foules or dowes. (Repealed by Statute Law Revision (Scotland) Act 1906 (6 Edw. 7. c. 38))
Fines Act 1597 (repealed)	1597 c. 38; 1597 c. 271	16 December 1597
Auld unlawes ar valued and amplified. (Repealed by Statute Law Revision (Scotland) Act 1906 (6 Edw. 7. c. 38))
Beggars and Gipsies Act 1597 (repealed)	1597 c. 39; 1597 c. 272	16 December 1597
Strang beggaris vagaboundis and Egiptians suld be punished. (Repealed by Statute Law Revision (Scotland) Act 1906 (6 Edw. 7. c. 38))
Lawburrows Act 1597 still in force	1597 c. 40; 1597 c. 273	16 December 1597
The panis of Law burroues Suld be payit be him quha for his dissobedience is de nunceit rebell. The cautioner may be Perseuit or the Principall.
General Band Act 1597 (repealed)	1597 c. 41; 1597 c. 274	16 December 1597
The paine of the generall band is devidit betuix the King and the pairtie. (Repealed by Statute Law Revision (Scotland) Act 1964 (c. 80))
Sheriff Clerks Act 1597 (repealed)	1597 c. 42; 1597 c. 275	16 December 1597
The schirreff clarkis sall bring thair buikis to the chekker. Thai suld be markit. (Repealed by Statute Law Revision (Scotland) Act 1906 (6 Edw. 7. c. 38))
Baron's Commissioners Act 1597 (repealed)	1597 c. 43; 1597 c. 276	16 December 1597
Barrounes suld send to the parliament commissioneris with sufficient commissionis. (Repealed by Statute Law Revision (Scotland) Act 1906 (6 Edw. 7. c. 38))
Prisons Act 1597 (repealed)	1597 c. 44; 1597 c. 277	16 December 1597
Prisoun houses suld be begged within all burroues. (Repealed by Statute Law Revision (Scotland) Act 1906 (6 Edw. 7. c. 38))
Benefices (No. 2) Act 1597 (repealed)	1597 c. 45; 1597 c. 278	16 December 1597
Anent dimissioun of benefices contening reservatioun of the lyfrent of the resignant. (Repealed by Statute Law Revision (Scotland) Act 1906 (6 Edw. 7. c. 38))
Burgh Act 1597 (repealed)	1597 c. 46; 1597 c. 279	16 December 1597
Of personis duelland within brught sub ject to the help of the pure to waching and warding. (Repealed by Statute Law Revision (Scotland) Act 1906 (6 Edw. 7. c. 38))
Burgh Taxation Act 1597 (repealed)	1597 c. 47; 1597 c. 280	16 December 1597
All burgesses suld be taxt and stentit be thair magistratis according to the rentis within burght. (Repealed by Statute Law Revision (Scotland) Act 1906 (6 Edw. 7. c. 38))
Supply Act 1597 (repealed)	1597 c. 48; 1597 c. 281	16 December 1597
Ane taxatioun to be grantit to the King. The forme and maner of the uptaking thairof. (Repealed by Statute Law Revision (Scotland) Act 1906 (6 Edw. 7. c. 38))
Not public and general	1597 c. 49 —	16 December 1597
Ratificatioun in favouris of the duik of Lennox.
Not public and general	1597 c. 50 —	16 December 1597
Act in favour of Sir Robert Melvill.
Not public and general	1597 c. 51 —	16 December 1597
Act in favour of the bishop of Brechin.
Not public and general	1597 c. 52 —	16 December 1597
Act in favour of the laird of Phillorthe anent the college of Fraserbrughe.
Not public and general	1597 c. 53 —	16 December 1597
Act in favouris of M^{r} Andro Knox minister at Paslay .
Not public and general	1597 c. 54 —	16 December 1597
ct in favour of the brughe of Abirdene.
Not public and general	1597 c. 55 —	16 December 1597
Act in favouris of the toun of Perthe.
Not public and general	1597 c. 56 —	16 December 1597
Act in favouris of the Kingis liegis quha accumpaneit his Majestie and his lieutennent in the northe partis of this realm.
Not public and general	1597 c. 57 —	16 December 1597
Act in favouris of William erle of Angus George erle of Huntlie and Francis erle of Erroll.
Not public and general	1597 c. 58 —	16 December 1597
Ratificatioun off the lordship of Dumfermeling to the Quenis Majestie.
Not public and general	1597 c. 59 —	16 December 1597
Ratificatioun to Andro lord Dinguell.
Not public and general	1597 c. 60 —	16 December 1597
Ratificatioun to the bishop of Abirdene.
Not public and general	1597 c. 61 —	16 December 1597
The ratificatioun grantit to the brugh of Narne.
Not public and general	1597 c. 62 —	16 December 1597
Ratificatioun to the toun of Jedbrughe.
Not public and general	1597 c. 63 —	16 December 1597
Anent the new fundatioune of the colledge of Auld Abirdene.
Not public and general	1597 c. 64 —	16 December 1597
Ratificatioun grantit in favouris of Sir Alex^{r} Home of Snuik knycht.
Not public and general	1597 c. 65 —	16 December 1597
Act anent the consistorie of Abirdene.
Coin Act 1597 (repealed)	1597 c. 66 —	16 December 1597
Ane act anent copper cunyie. (Repealed by Statute Law Revision (Scotland) Act 1906 (6 Edw. 7. c. 38))
Not public and general	1597 c. 67 —	16 December 1597
Act to sett takis of the teyndshevis of the priorie of Sanctandrois.
Not public and general	1597 c. 68 —	16 December 1597
Anent the fewing of the houssis within the abbay of Sanctandrois.
Not public and general	1597 c. 69 —	16 December 1597
Act in favouris of Ewstatius Roghe.
Not public and general	1597 c. 70 —	16 December 1597
Act in favouris of my lord Tungland.
Not public and general	1597 c. 71 —	16 December 1597
Ratificatioun to Sir James Melvill.
Not public and general	1597 c. 72 —	16 December 1597
Ratificatioun and exceptioun in favouris of Andro Melvill.
Not public and general	1597 c. 73 —	16 December 1597
Ratificatioun of the resignationis and dissolutioun of the kirkis of Northberwik.
Not public and general	1597 c. 74 —	
No record of this act is preserved.
Not public and general	1597 c. 75 —	
No record of this act is preserved.
Not public and general	1597 c. 76 —	
No record of this act is preserved.
Not public and general	1597 c. 77 —	
No record of this act is preserved.
Not public and general	1597 c. 78 —	
No record of this act is preserved.
Not public and general	1597 c. 79 —	
No record of this act is preserved.
Not public and general	1597 c. 80 —	
No record of this act is preserved.
Not public and general	1597 c. 81 —	
No record of this act is preserved.
Not public and general	1597 c. 82 —	
No record of this act is preserved.
Not public and general	1597 c. 83 —	
No record of this act is preserved.
Not public and general	1597 c. 84 —	
No record of this act is preserved.
Not public and general	1597 c. 85 —	
No record of this act is preserved.
Not public and general	1597 c. 86 —	
No record of this act is preserved.
Not public and general	1597 c. 87 —	
No record of this act is preserved.
Not public and general	1597 c. 88 —	
No record of this act is preserved.
Not public and general	1597 c. 89 —	
No record of this act is preserved.
Not public and general	1597 c. 90 —	
No record of this act is preserved.
Not public and general	1597 c. 91 —	
No record of this act is preserved.
Not public and general	1597 c. 92 —	
No record of this act is preserved.
Not public and general	1597 c. 93 —	
No record of this act is preserved.
Not public and general	1597 c. 94 —	
No record of this act is preserved.
Not public and general	1597 c. 95 —	
No record of this act is preserved.

=== Sources ===
- Alexander, William (1841). "Acta Parliamentorum Regis Jacobi Sexti". An Abridgement of the Acts of the Parliaments of Scotland. Edinburgh: Adam and Charles Black. pp. A36 – A37 – via Google Books.
- Alexander, William (1841). "Acta Parliamentorum Regis Jacobi Sexti". An Abridgement of the Acts of the Parliaments of Scotland. Edinburgh: Adam and Charles Black. pp. A36 – A37 – via Google Books.
- Chronological Table of the Statutes. London: Her Majesty's Stationery Office. 1972. pp. 1344–1345 – via Google Books.
- "Acts of the Old Scottish Parliament: 1597". legislation.gov.uk. The National Archives.
- "Index of Statutes: James VI (1567-1625)". Records of the Parliaments of Scotland to 1707. University of St Andrews.

== See also ==
- List of legislation in the United Kingdom
- Records of the Parliaments of Scotland
