= Abolition of Feudal Tenure etc. (Scotland) Act 2000 =

Act of the Scottish Parliament

Abolition of Feudal Tenure etc. (Scotland) Act 2000 (Note: Section 77(1)(a).)
- Act of the Scottish Parliament
- Scottish Parliament
- Long title: An Act of the Scottish Parliament to abolish the feudal system of land tenure; to abolish a related system of land tenure; to make new provision as respects the ownership of land; to make consequential provision for the extinction and recovery of feuduties and of certain other perpetual periodical payments and for the extinction by prescription of any obligation to pay redemption money under the Land Tenure Reform (Scotland) Act 1974; to make further provision as respects real burdens affecting land; to provide for the disentailment of land; to discharge all rights of irritancy held by superiors; to abolish the obligation of thirlage; to prohibit with certain exceptions the granting of leases over land for periods exceeding 175 years; to make new provision as respects conveyancing; to enable firms with separate personality to own land; and for connected purposes.
- Citation: 2000 asp 5
- Introduced by: Jim Wallace
- Territorial extent: Scotland

Dates
- Royal assent: 9 June 2000
- Commencement: 9 June 2000
Other legislation
Amends	Titles to Land Consolidation (Scotland) Act 1868; Military Lands Act 1892; Education (Scotland) Act 1980; Water (Scotland) Act 1980; Housing Associations Act 1985; Crofters (Scotland) Act 1993; Coal Industry Act 1994; Value Added Tax Act 1994; Town and Country Planning (Scotland) Act 1997; See § Repealed enactments
Repeals/revokes	See § Repealed enactments
Amended by	Title Conditions (Scotland) Act 2003; Title Conditions (Scotland) Act 2003 (Consequential Provisions) Order 2003; National Health Service Reform (Scotland) Act 2004; Housing (Scotland) Act 2006; Consumer Protection from Unfair Trading Regulations 2008; Flood Risk Management (Scotland) Act 2009; Corporation Tax Act 2010; Land Registration etc. (Scotland) Act 2012; Housing (Scotland) Act 2014; Agriculture and Rural Communities (Scotland) Act 2024; Judicial Factors (Scotland) Act 2025
Relates to	Title Conditions (Scotland) Act 2003; Tenements (Scotland) Act 2004

Status: Current legislation

History of passage through the Parliament

Text of statute as originally enacted

Revised text of statute as amended

Text of the Abolition of Feudal Tenure etc. (Scotland) Act 2000 as in force today (including any amendments) within the United Kingdom, from legislation.gov.uk.

The Abolition of Feudal Tenure etc. (Scotland) Act 2000 (asp 5) was a land reform enforced by an act of the Scottish Parliament that was passed by the Scottish Parliament on 3 May 2000, and received royal assent on 9 June 2000.

== Provisions ==
The act officially brought to an end annual feu duties, a vestige of feudal land tenure, on 28 November 2004 (that is, Martinmas, as the act required the "appointed day" to be one of the Scottish term days). Tommy Sheridan was one of a number of MSPs who drove this change through the Scottish Parliament. After that date, the former vassal of an estate was the sole owner of the land, and the former superior's rights were extinguished. For a further two years, the superior had the option of claiming compensation; this was fixed at a single payment of a size that, when invested at an annual rate of 2.5%, would yield interest equal to the former feu duty. Because inflation had eroded the value of duties, which had been fixed many years before, this payment was in most cases extremely small compared with the current value of the land.

In consequence of this change in the legal basis of land-holding, the act also reformulated the legal basis on which conditions on the use of land can be specified in the title to ownership of that land. Such title conditions (known variously as real burdens and real conditions in the prior law) were combined into "real burdens". Prior to the act, a superior could choose to enforce title conditions, or grant a consent or waiver (usually for payment) allowing the land owner to disregard the condition even if otherwise neighbouring property owners might wish to enforce the condition. Existing conditions which were enforceable only by the superior were abolished, and only conditions enforceable by the owners of neighbouring property or by certain legal bodies on public policy grounds were retained. Transitional arrangements allowed superiors who were also neighbouring property owners to convert the old title conditions to benefit their land and hence themselves as owners of that land rather than themselves as feudal superior.

=== Repealed enactments ===
Section 76(2) of the act repealed 124 enactments, listed in parts 1 and 2 of schedule 13 to the act.

==== Part 1: Repeals: general ====
Part 1 — Repeals: general
Citation	Short title	Extent of repeal
1592 (c. 31)	Mines and Metals Act 1592	The words "or few".
1597 (c. 17)	Feu-duty Act 1597	The whole act.
1661 (c. 243)	Registration Act 1661	The whole act.
1672 (c. 24)	Ann Act 1672	The whole act.
1685 (c. 26)	Entail Act 1685	The whole act.
1690 (c. 61)	Udal Tenure Act 1690	The whole act.
1690 (c. 63)	Teinds Act 1690	The whole act.
20 Geo. 2. c. 50	Tenures Abolition Act 1746	The whole act except sections 21 and 22.
10 Geo. 3. c. 51	Entail Improvement Act 1770	The whole act.
35 Geo. 3. c. 122	Burghs of Barony (Scotland) Act 1795	The whole act.
39 Geo. 3. c. 55	Thirlage Act 1799	The whole act.
48 Geo. 3. c. 138	Teinds Act 1808	The whole act.
5 Geo. 4. c. 87	Entail Provisions Act 1824	The whole act.
10 Geo. 4. c. 19	Register of Sasines Act 1829	The whole act.
3 & 4 Will. 4. c. 13	Public Revenue (Scotland) Act 1833	In section 1, the words from "or in relation to the issuing or paying any stipend" to "behalf, or others entitled thereto;"; and the words "granting tacks of teinds, or to the".
4 & 5 Will. 4. c. 41	New Churches (Scotland) Act 1834	The whole act.
6 & 7 Will. 4. c. 33	Erasures in Deeds (Scotland) Act 1836	The whole act.
6 & 7 Will. 4. c. 42	Entail Powers Act 1836	The whole act.
1 & 2 Vict. c. 70	Entail Act 1838	The whole act.
1 & 2 Vict. c. 118	Court of Session (No. 2) Act 1838	The whole act.
2 & 3 Vict. c. 36	Court of Session Act 1839	The whole act.
3 & 4 Vict. c. 48	Entail Sites Act 1840	The whole act.
7 & 8 Vict. c. 44	New Parishes (Scotland) Act 1844	The whole act.
8 & 9 Vict. c. 19	Lands Clauses Consolidation (Scotland) Act 1845	In section 7, the words "heirs of entail,", "estate or", "married women seised in their own right or entitled to terce or dower, or any other right or interest, husbands,", "or feoffees", "and as to such married women as if they were sole," and, in the last two places where they occur, "married women,". In section 8, the words from "power herein" to "therewith, and the"; and, in both places where they occur, the words "feu duties, ground annuals,". Sections 10 and 11. In section 12, the word ", feu,", in both places where it occurs. In section 67, the words "heir of entail,", "married woman seised in her own right or entitled to terce or dower or any other right or interest, husband,", "on the same heirs, or", ", or affecting succeeding heirs of entail in any such lands, whether imposed and constituted by the entailer, or in virtue of powers given by the entail, or in virtue of powers conferred by any Act of Parliament" and "same heirs, and the". In each of sections 69 and 70, the word "coverture," and the word "husbands,". Section 73. In section 79, the words "feu or" and ", and of re-entailing any of such lands,". In section 80, the words "feus and", in both places where they occur; and the words "the particular register of sasines kept for the county, burgh, or district in which the lands are locally situated, or in", "for Scotland kept at Edinburgh, within sixty days from the last date thereof, which the respective keepers of the said registers are hereby authorized and required to do,", "feudal" and from ": Provided always" to the end. In section 93, the words "; and if such lands be part of a barony a like notice shall be given to the superior or baron". In the preamble to sections 107 to 111, the words "any feu duty, ground annual, casualty of superiority, or". In section 109, the words "such feu duty, ground annual, casualty of superiority, or any". In section 110, the words "feu duty, ground annual, casualty of superiority,". In section 117, the word "estate,", in each place where it occurs. In section 124, the words from ", by deed" to the end. Sections 126 and 127. Schedule (B.).
8 & 9 Vict. c. 35	Infeftment Act 1845	The whole act.
11 & 12 Vict. c. 36	Entail Amendment Act 1848	Sections 1 to 31. In section 32, the words from "may be in the form" to "in terms of this Act;". Sections 33 to 45. In section 47, the words "dated on or after the first day of August one thousand eight hundred and forty-eight", "fee simple" in each of the three places where they occur and "the superior of such lands or estate, and of". In section 48, the words "dated on or after the said first day of August one thousand eight hundred and forty eight", "fee simple" and "the superior of such lands or estate, and of". In section 49, the words "or estate" in both places where they occur and "dated on or after the said first day of August one thousand eight hundred and forty eight". Sections 50 and 51. The Schedule.
12 & 13 Vict. c. 51	Judicial Factors Act 1849	In section 7, the words from "and if the estate be held under entail," to "could have charged the estate under the said Acts, or either of them;".
16 & 17 Vict. c. 94	Entail Amendment Act 1853	The whole act.
20 & 21 Vict. c. 26	Registration of Leases (Scotland) Act 1857	Sections 4, 5, 8, 9 and 11. Schedules (C) and (F).
22 Vict. c. 12	Defence Act 1859	In section 3, the words "feus and", in both places where they occur; the word "feudal"; and the words from ": provided always" to the end.
23 & 24 Vict. c. 95	Entail Cottages Act 1860	The whole act.
23 & 24 Vict. c. 106	Lands Clauses Consolidation Acts Amendment Act 1860	Section 3. In each of sections 4 and 5, the words ", annual feu duty or ground annual", in each place where they occur. In section 8, the words ", or of the Lands Clauses Consolidation (Scotland) Act, 1845, in all matters in which it relates to the said Act respectively.".
25 & 26 Vict. c. 58	Parochial Buildings (Scotland) Act 1862	The whole act.
26 & 27 Vict. c. 47	Church of Scotland Courts Act 1863	In section 2, the words from ", and at the same time" to "shall subsist". In section 3, the words from ", and to apportion" to the end.
27 & 28 Vict. c. 33	Fish Teinds (Scotland) Act 1864	The whole act.
27 & 28 Vict. c. 114	Improvement of Land Act 1864	The whole act.
29 & 30 Vict. c. 71	Glebe Lands (Scotland) Act 1866	The whole act.
29 & 30 Vict. c. 75	Parochial Buildings (Scotland) Act 1866	The whole act.
31 & 32 Vict. c. 30	United Parishes (Scotland) Act 1868	The whole act.
31 & 32 Vict. c. 64	Land Registers (Scotland) Act 1868	In section 5, the words "in terms of such new warrant". In section 6, the words "in terms of the warrant of registration thereon". In section 12, the words "and shall be in the form, as nearly as may be, of the Schedule (B.) to this Act annexed,".
31 & 32 Vict. c. 84	Entail Amendment (Scotland) Act 1868	The whole act.
31 & 32 Vict. c. 96	Ecclesiastical Buildings and Glebes (Scotland) Act 1868	The whole act.
31 & 32 Vict. c. 101	Titles to Land Consolidation (Scotland) Act 1868	In section 3, the words "The words "Crown writ" shall extend to and include all charters, precepts, and writs from Her Majesty, and from the Prince; and"; the definition of "charter" and of "writ"; in the definition of "deed" and of "conveyance", the words "charters,", "whether containing a warrant or precept of sasine or not, and", "feu contracts, contracts of ground annual,", ", whether such decrees contain warrant to infeft or precept of sasine or not," and ", procuratories of resignation an remanentiam,"; the definition of "deed of entail"; in the definition of "instrument", the words "authorized by this Act, or by any of the Acts hereby repealed,"; and the definition of "infeft" and "infeftment". Sections 4 to 7. In section 8, the words ", and to all open procuratories, clauses, and precepts, if any, and as the case may be,"; and the words from "; and the clause of obligation" to "other public, parochial, and local burdens, due from or on account of the lands conveyed prior to the date of entry". Sections 9 and 10. In section 12, the words from "with a warrant of registration" to "hereto annexed),"; the words from "and warrant of registration;" to "on whose behalf the conveyance is presented"; and the words from "or to expede and record" to the end. Sections 14 to 19. Section 23. In section 24, the words ", with warrant of registration thereon,". In section 26, the words "with warrant of registration thereon in terms of this Act, or when followed by notarial instrument expede, and with warrant of registration thereon recorded"; and "feued,". Sections 27 to 50. In section 51, the word "said", where it first occurs; and the words from "or Sheriffs of counties" to the end. Sections 63 to 116. Sections 118 and 119. In section 120, the words ", whether dated before or after the commencement of this Act,"; and the proviso. Sections 121 to 127. Sections 130 to 137. In section 140, the words ", and subsequent sheets (if any) shall be chargeable with the appropriate progressive duty". Section 141. In section 142, the words ", and all instruments hereby" and ", with warrants of registration written thereon respectively,". Sections 144 to 147. Sections 150 to 154. Section 156. Sections 161 to 163. The Schedules, except Schedules (B.) No.1, (F.) No.1, (G.), (PP.) and (RR.). In Schedule (B.) No. 1, the words from "to be holden" to "as the case may be];"; and the words "feu duties, casualties, and".
32 & 33 Vict. c. 116	Titles to Land Consolidation (Scotland) Amendment Act 1869	The whole act.
33 & 34 Vict. c. 56	Limited Owners Residences Act 1870	The whole act.
34 & 35 Vict. c. 84	Limited Owners Residences Act (1870) Amendment Act 1871	The whole act.
37 & 38 Vict. c. 82	Church Patronage (Scotland) Act 1874	In section 8, the words from ", or the right to teind" to the end.
37 & 38 Vict. c. 94	Conveyancing (Scotland) Act 1874	In section 3, the definitions of "Estate in land" and of "Superior" and "superiority"; in the definition of "heritable securities" and "securities", the words ", and shall also, when used in this Act, include real burdens and securities by way of ground annual"; and the definitions of "Infeftment", "Feu" and "feu-duty" and "Casualties". Sections 4 to 8. In section 10 (as saved by section 37(1)(d) of the Succession (Scotland) Act 1964), the words "neither infeft nor served, but", "by virtue of this Act,", "and assignation" and from "Such petition" to the end. Sections 14 to 26. In section 29, the words "under this Act, and no other decree, instrument, or conveyance". Section 30. In section 32, the word ", instrument,", where it occurs for the first and third times; and the words "feu or otherwise". In section 35, the word "joint"; and the words from ", as an assignation" to the end. In section 36, the words from ", with a holding" to the end. Section 37. Sections 48 and 49. In section 51, the words "production to any notary public of the"; the words "the production to such notary of"; and the words from ", and it shall not" to the end. Sections 52, 53, 57 and 58. In section 59, the words "shall apply to lands held of the Crown and of the Prince, in the same way as to lands held of a subject superior, but". Section 60. Schedules A to C. Schedule D (being the form of memorandum of allocation of feu-duty; and not that Schedule D substituted for Schedule O by section 8(1) of the Conveyancing (Scotland) Act 1924). Schedules F and G. In Schedule H, the word ", instrument,", where it last occurs. Schedule L. In Schedule M, the words from ", e.g. ]," to "or as the case may be". Schedule N.
38 & 39 Vict. c. 61	Entail Amendment (Scotland) Act 1875	The whole act.
39 & 40 Vict. c. 11	United Parishes (Scotland) Act 1876	The whole act.
40 & 41 Vict. c. 40	Writs Execution (Scotland) Act 1877	In section 6, the words "upon a warrant of registration".
41 & 42 Vict. c. 28	Entail Amendment (Scotland) Act 1878	The whole act.
45 & 46 Vict. c. 38	Settled Land Act 1882	The whole act.
45 & 46 Vict. c. 53	Entail (Scotland) Act 1882	The whole act.
50 & 51 Vict. c. 69	Conveyancing (Scotland) Acts (1874 and 1879) Amendment Act 1887	Sections 1, 3 and 4. In section 5, the words "The production to any notary public of"; "expeding a notarial instrument, or otherwise"; and from "; and it shall not" to the end.
52 & 53 Vict. c. 39	Judicial Factors (Scotland) Act 1889	In section 6, the words "the Entail (Scotland) Act, 1882,".
52 & 53 Vict. c. 55	Universities (Scotland) Act 1889	In section 24, the words ", without prejudice to the rights of Her Majesty as superior of the said garden and buildings, and to the rights of any subject superior in and to the said garden and buildings,".
53 & 54 Vict. c. 69	Settled Land Act 1890	The whole act.
54 & 55 Vict. c. 9	Registration of Certain Writs (Scotland) Act 1891	The whole act.
57 & 58 Vict. c. 44	Heritable Securities (Scotland) Act 1894	In section 7, the words "disponed in security", where they occur for the second time. Sections 8 to 10. In section 12, the word ", eight,". Sections 14 to 17. Schedule (D.).
62 & 63 Vict. c. 46	Improvement of Land Act 1899	The whole act.
63 & 64 Vict. c. 20	Ecclesiastical Assessments (Scotland) Act 1900	The whole act.
4 & 5 Geo. 5. c. 43	Entail (Scotland) Act 1914	In section 2, the words "and any clause of consent to registration in the register of entails"; and the provisos. Sections 3 to 8. In section 10, the words ", unless the contrary intention appears," and ", and the words "heir of entail" shall include the institute".
4 & 5 Geo. 5. c. 48	Feudal Casualties (Scotland) Act 1914	The whole act.
9 & 10 Geo. 5. c. 97	Land Settlement (Scotland) Act 1919	Section 4.
10 & 11 Geo. 5. c. 34	Duplicands of Feu-duties (Scotland) Act 1920	The whole act.
11 & 12 Geo. 5. c. 58	Trusts (Scotland) Act 1921	In section 4(1), paragraph (b). In section 6, the words from "sell subject to" to "be lawful to". In section 12(1), the words from "on any charge or" to "1899, or". Section 13.
13 & 14 Geo. 5. c. 34	Agricultural Credits Act 1923	Section 3(4) and (5). In section 5, in paragraph (a), the definitions of "freehold or copyhold land", "mortgage", "devisee" and "incumbrance"; and paragraph (b).
14 & 15 Geo. 5. c. 27	Conveyancing (Scotland) Act 1924	In section 2(1)(b), the words from "real burdens" to "them, and". In section 3, the words "last infeft or". In section 4, in subsection (2), the words "by infeftment"; in subsection (3), the words from ", or in the case" to "that Schedule"; and in subsection (4), the words ", or in the case of a ground annual in or as nearly as may be in the terms of Form No. 6 of that Schedule" and from "And on such notice" to the end. In section 5, in subsection (2)(a), the words "infeft or uninfeft, or"; and in subsection (3)(a), the words "last infeft or". Section 6. In section 8, subsection (2). In section 9, in subsection (1), the words ", whether prohibitory, irritant, resolutive or otherwise,", ", instrument", where it secondly occurs, "(including any disposition granted by a creditor to himself pursuant to section eight of the Heritable Securities (Scotland) Act 1894)" and from ", and where" to the end; and in subsection (4), the words ", although the warrant of registration thereon shall be on behalf of the granter only". Sections 10 to 13. In section 19, the words "or fee". Sections 20 and 23. In section 24, the words ", including power of sale and other rights under a bond and disposition in security," and ", and such forms shall have the same force and effect as the corresponding forms prescribed by the Registration of Leases (Scotland) Act 1857,"; in paragraph (1) of the proviso, the words from ", for "infeft"" to the end; and in paragraph (5) of the proviso, the words from "by notarial instrument" to "law and practice". Sections 25, 26 and 28 to 39. In section 40(1), the words "feu-duty, ground-annual, stipend," and "feu-duty and casualties, ground-annual, stipend or". Sections 42 and 43. In section 49, subsection (1). In Schedule B, in Form No. 3, the words "last infeft therein, or"; and Forms Nos. 4 and 6. Schedules F to H and the Notes to Schedule F. Schedules K to N and the Notes to Schedule K.
15 & 16 Geo. 5. c. 33	Church of Scotland (Property and Endowments) Act 1925	Part I. In section 22, in subsection (2)(h), the word "feuing,"; and in subsection (3), the word "feu,". Section 27. In section 28, in subsection (3)(b), the words from ", to the same effect" to the end; and subsections (6) to (8). In section 30(3), in paragraph (c), the words from ", whether as" to "in place of the minister"; in paragraph (e), the words "feu-duties and Government or other" and from "under or in pursuance" to "made by a minister"; and paragraph (f). Section 31. In section 34, in subsection (1), in paragraph (b), the words "and certified by the Clerk of Teinds", and paragraph (e); subsection (3); and in subsection (4)(iii) the words "feu-duties, ground annuals, bonds of annual rent, or other", "with the sanction of the Court of Teinds" and "or payment of the feu-duty thereon". In section 35(7), the words "uninfeft or infeft". In section 36, the proviso. In section 37, the words "heritor or other". Sections 39 to 41. In section 42, the words from ", and to the teinds" to the end. Sections 45 and 46. In section 47, in subsection (1), in the definition of "Stipend", the words ", including any allowance for communion elements payable by heritors out of teinds"; and subsections (2) and (3). Schedules 1 to 7.
19 & 20 Geo. 5. c. 13	Agricultural Credits (Scotland) Act 1929	In section 6(2), the words "or to the superior of the lands occupied by the society", "or superior" and "or feuduty".
23 & 24 Geo. 5. c. 44	Church of Scotland (Property and Endowments) (Amendment) Act 1933	In section 7, paragraph (ii) of the proviso; and the word "and" immediately preceding that paragraph. In section 8(1), the words ", or any obligation at common law for payment of the stipend or part of the stipend of the parish being a parish quoad omnia". In section 9, subsections (1) and (2); and in subsection (3), the words "or take in feu" and "or feu-duty". Sections 10 and 11.
1 Edw. 8 & 1 Geo. 6. c. 28	Harbours, Piers and Ferries (Scotland) Act 1937	In section 31(1), in the definition of "owner", the words "deed of entail or other".
1 & 2 Geo. 6. c. 24	Conveyancing Amendment (Scotland) Act 1938	Sections 6 and 8.
8 & 9 Geo. 6. c. 43	Requisitioned Land and War Works Act 1945	In section 60(4), the words "the dominium utile or, in the case of land other than feudal land,".
9 & 10 Geo. 6. c. 59	Coal Industry Nationalisation Act 1946	In section 64, in subsection (2), the words ", and does not include any stipend"; and subsection (3).
11 & 12 Geo. 6. c. 17	Requisitioned Land and War Works Act 1948	In section 18(4), the words "the dominium utile or, in the case of land other than feudal land,".
11 & 12 Geo. 6. c. 57	Public Registers and Records (Scotland) Act 1948	In section 1(2), the words ", the Register of Entails".
12, 13 & 14 Geo. 6. c. 97	National Parks and Access to the Countryside Act 1949	In section 114(1), the words "and as respects Scotland has the meaning assigned to it by section twenty-six of this Act".
2 & 3 Eliz. 2. c. 49	Long Leases (Scotland) Act 1954	Part I. Section 30. The Schedules.
2 & 3 Eliz. 2. c. 73	Town and Country Planning (Scotland) Act 1954	Section 69.
5 & 6 Eliz. 2. c. 30	Church of Scotland (Property and Endowments) (Amendment) Act 1957	The whole act.
6 & 7 Eliz. 2. c. 24	Land Drainage (Scotland) Act 1958	In section 18(1), in the definition of "owner", paragraph (a).
6 & 7 Eliz. 2. c. 69	Opencast Coal Act 1958	In section 52, in subsection (2), in the definitions of "freehold interest" and "owner", the words "of the dominium utile"; and subsections (6) to (8).
7 & 8 Eliz. 2. c. 70	Town and Country Planning (Scotland) Act 1959	In section 27(5)(d), the words ", feu duty". In section 44, the words "such an interest in", "dominium utile in the" and "feu duty, any ground annual and any". In section 54, subsection (7).
9 & 10 Eliz. 2. c. 62	Trustee Investments Act 1961	In Schedule 1, Part II, in paragraph 14, the words ", and in feu-duties or ground annuals in Scotland".
1963 c. 51	Land Compensation (Scotland) Act 1963	In section 20, in subsection (1), the words "the dominium utile in", in both places where they occur; in subsection (2), the words "feu-duty, or ground annual or other" and "(not being stipend or standard charge in lieu of stipend)"; in subsection (7), the words "dominium utile in any"; and in subsection (8), the words "the dominium utile in". In section 27(3), the words "and that interest is the dominium utile of the land,", "feu-duty or ground annual or other" and "(not being stipend or standard charge in lieu of stipend)". In section 28, in paragraph (e), the words "the dominium utile of" and, in both places where they occur, "feu-duty or"; and in paragraph (f), the words "the dominium utile of". Section 45(8) and (9). In Schedule 2, in paragraph 2(2), the words "the superior of, and".
1964 c. 40	Harbours Act 1964	In section 57(1), in the definition of "owner", in paragraph (a), the words ", if the land is feudal property, the proprietor of the dominium utile or, if the land is not feudal property,".
1964 c. 41	Succession (Scotland) Act 1964	In section 18, subsection (1).
1965 c. 36	Gas Act 1965	In section 28(1), in the definition of "owner", in paragraph (a), the words ", if the land is feudal property, the proprietor of the dominium utile or, if the land is not feudal property,".
1967 c. 10	Forestry Act 1967	In section 34(3), the words "the proprietor of the dominium utile or, in the case of land other than feudal land, is". In section 49, subsection (3).
1967 c. 86	Countryside (Scotland) Act 1967	In section 6, in each of subsections (1)(a) and (2), the word "feu,". In each of sections 24(1) and 25(1), the word "feu,".
1968 c. 41	Countryside Act 1968	In section 24(2), the word "feu,".
1968 c. 70	Law Reform (Miscellaneous Provisions) (Scotland) Act 1968	In section 18(2), paragraph (c).
1969 c. 10	Mines and Quarries (Tips) Act 1969	In section 36(3)(b)(i), the words "the dominium utile or, in the case of land not held on feudal tenure, the proprietor, of".
1970 c. 35	Conveyancing and Feudal Reform (Scotland) Act 1970	In section 2, in subsection (6), the definition of "interest in land"; and subsection (7). Sections 3 to 6. In section 9(8)(c), the words "feuduty, ground annual,". In section 12(1), the words "having right to that interest, but". In section 30(2), the definition of "infeft". Sections 33 to 35. Section 39. In section 41(1), the words "of the interest". In section 43(1), the definition of "the Act of 1894". Section 49. In Schedule 1, in paragraph 1, the words "feuduty, ground annual," and "skat, dry multure, teind, stipend, standard charge". In the Notes to Schedule 2, in each of notes 2 and 3, the words "ground annual or". In Schedule 3, in condition 10(3), the words "feuduties, ground annuals or, as the case may be,". In Schedule 8, paragraphs 2, 3, 7 to 14, 16 and 17, 18 to 22, 24 and 26 to 30.
1970 c. 40	Agriculture Act 1970	In section 33, subsection (5).
1973 c. 52	Prescription and Limitation (Scotland) Act 1973	In section 15(1), the definition of "interest in land". In Schedule 1, in paragraph 1(a), heads (iii) and (iv); and in paragraph 2(f), the words "terce, courtesy,".
1974 c. 38	Land Tenure Reform (Scotland) Act 1974	Part I, except section 2. In section 2, the words "(other than feuduty)" and "a payment of teind, stipend or standard charge,". Sections 14 and 15. In section 22, the words "held of the Crown and of the Prince and Steward of Scotland, and to land in which there is any other interest". In section 23(1), the words "ground annual or other". Schedules 1 to 4.
1975 c. 8	Offshore Petroleum Development (Scotland) Act 1975	In section 14(1), the word "superior,". In section 20, in subsection (2), in the definition of "Crown interest", the words "estate or"; and in subsection (3), the words "estate or".
1975 c. 69	Scottish Development Agency Act 1975	In section 9(1)(a), the word "feu,". In section 11(1), the word "superior,".
1979 c. 33	Land Registration (Scotland) Act 1979	In section 3, in subsection (3), paragraph (c); in subsection (4), paragraph (b); and in subsection (6), the words "by person uninfeft". In section 6(3), the words "over-feuduty or" in both places where they occur. In section 12, in subsection (3)(m), the words "a superior, a creditor in a ground annual or", "the feu writ, the contract of ground annual or", ", as the case may be,", "superior, creditor or" and, in both places where they occur, "feuduty, ground annual or"; and in subsection (4)(a), the words "over-feuduty or". In section 15(2)(a), the words "sections 10 and 146 of and Schedule D to the Titles to Land Consolidation (Scotland) Act 1868,". In section 16, subsection (2); and in subsection (3)(b) the words "feuduties, ground annuals," and "and, in the case of a grant of land in feu, of all feuduties payable by the grantor to his superiors from and after the date of entry". In section 20, in subsection (3), paragraph (ii), and the word "; and" immediately preceding that paragraph; in subsection (6), the words ", and all such feuduties, ground annuals or other periodical payments as are mentioned in subsection (3)(ii) above"; and subsection (8)(a)(ii). In section 28(1), the definition of "feu".
1979 c. 46	Ancient Monuments and Archaeological Areas Act 1979	In section 18(4), the words "or heir of entail". In section 57(1), the words "of the dominium utile,".
1980 c. 13	Slaughter of Animals (Scotland) Act 1980	In section 1, the word "feu,".
1980 c. 44	Education (Scotland) Act 1980	In each of sections 20(1)(a) and 22(1)(a), the word "feu,".
1980 c. 45	Water (Scotland) Act 1980	In section 20, the word "feu,". In section 65, in subsection (5), the word "estates," and paragraph (a); and in subsection (8), the words "or rentcharge". In Schedule 4, in paragraph 8, the words "feuduties, ground annuals,".
1985 c. 6	Companies Act 1985	In section 396(1)(a)(ii) or (if section 92 of the Companies Act 1989 has not come into force by the date on which, subject to paragraph 46(3) of schedule 12 to this Act, that schedule and this schedule come into force) in section 410(4)(a), the words ", ground annual". In Schedule 4, in paragraph 93, the words "is the proprietor of the dominium utile or, in the case of land not held on feudal tenure," and "; and the reference to ground— rents, rates and other outgoings includes feu-duty and ground annual". In Schedule 9, in paragraph 86, the words "is the proprietor of the dominium utile or, in the case of land not held on feudal tenure," and "; and the reference to ground— rents, rates and other outgoings includes a reference to feu-duty and ground annual".
1986 c. 45	Insolvency Act 1986	In Schedule 1, in paragraph 2, the word "feu,". In Schedule 2, in paragraph 2, the word "feu,".
1987 c. 18	Debtors (Scotland) Act 1987	In section 15(1), in the definition of "adjudication for debt", paragraph (b) and the word "or" immediately preceding that paragraph. In section 99(1), the words "or superior's" and "or feuduty". In section 101, the words "(other than an action under section 23(5) of the Conveyancing (Scotland) Act 1924)".
1987 c. 26	Housing (Scotland) Act 1987	In section 125(2), the words "of the superior of whom such owner holds, and". Section 132(1). In section 175(1), the words "superior or". Section 334. In section 338(1), the definitions of "sell" and "sale" and of "superior".
1988 c. 1	Income and Corporation Taxes Act 1988	In section 15(1), in Schedule A, in paragraph 1(4)(b), the words ", ground annuals and feu duties". In section 119(3), in the definition of "rent", the word ", feuduty".
1989 c. 39	Self-Governing Schools etc. (Scotland) Act 1989	In section 39(4)(a), the words "an interest in". In section 80(1), the definition of "interest in land".
1990 c. 35	Enterprise and New Towns (Scotland) Act 1990	In section 10(1), the word "superior,". In section 36(2), the words "estate or".
1991 c. 28	Natural Heritage (Scotland) Act 1991	In section 22(1), in the definition of "land", the word "estate,".
1991 c. 45	Coal Mining Subsidence Act 1991	In section 52(1), in the definition of "owner", paragraph (b). In Schedule 1, in paragraph 2(6), the definition of "incumbrance". In Schedule 2, in paragraph 3(2), head (b); and in paragraph 4(2)(b), the words "an entail or". In Schedule 6, in paragraph 1(5), the words ", but do not include references to an interest as a superior only".
1991 c. 55	Agricultural Holdings (Scotland) Act 1991	In section 74, the words "estate or" and "dominium utile of the". In section 75, in subsection (1), the words "dominium utile of the"; and in subsection (3), the words "dominium utile of the" and "absolute".
1993 c. 44	Crofters (Scotland) Act 1993	In section 16, in subsection (3), the words "estates or"; and subsection (7). In section 17(3), paragraph (a); the words ", or (b)"; and in paragraph (b) the word "other". In section 19(4), paragraph (a); and, in each of paragraphs (b) and (c), the words "otherwise than in feu".
1994 c. 21	Coal Industry Act 1994	In section 10(7), paragraph (b) and the word "and" immediately preceding that paragraph.
1994 c. 23	Value Added Tax Act 1994	In section 96(1), in the definition of "fee simple", in paragraph (a), the words "estate or interest of the proprietor of the dominium utile or, in the case of land not held on feudal tenure, the estate or".
1997 c. 8	Town and Country Planning (Scotland) Act 1997	In section 191, subsection (9). In section 272(2), in paragraph (b), the word "superior,". In section 277, in subsection (1), in the definition of "disposal", the words ", except in section 191(9)," and in paragraph (a) of the definition of "heritable security", the words "a security by way of ground annual and"; and subsection (8). In Schedule 15, in paragraph 7, the words "feuduty, ground annual or"; and in paragraph 34, the words "a feuduty, ground annual,".
1997 c. 9	Planning (Listed Buildings and Conservation Areas) (Scotland) Act 1997	In section 81, subsection (7).
1999 c. 16	Finance Act 1999	In Part III of Schedule 13, in paragraph 18(1), head (c).

==== Part 2: Repeals relating to the National Trust for Scotland ====
Part 2 — Repeals relating to the National Trust for Scotland
Citation	Short title	Extent of repeal
26 Geo. 5 & 1 Edw. 8. c. ii	National Trust for Scotland Order Confirmation Act 1935	In the Order contained in the Schedule, in section 4(2), the word "feu" and, in section 6(2), the words "notarial instrument or".
10 & 11 Geo. 6. c. xxxviii	National Trust for Scotland Order Confirmation Act 1947	In the Order contained in the Schedule, in section 3(a), the words from "feu duties" to "any".

== Subsequent developments ==
Following this change in the legal basis for title conditions, the Title Conditions (Scotland) Act 2003 was passed, reconstituting the mechanics of how new real burdens and servitudes could be created. These two acts, together with a third act (the Tenements (Scotland) Act 2004), commenced on 28 November 2004.

== See also ==
- Land reform in Scotland
