= List of acts of the Parliament of Scotland from 1690 =

This is a list of acts of the Parliament of Scotland for the year 1690.

It lists acts of Parliament of the old Parliament of Scotland, that was merged with the old Parliament of England to form the Parliament of Great Britain, by the Union with England Act 1707 (c. 7).

For other years, see list of acts of the Parliament of Scotland. For the period after 1707, see list of acts of the Parliament of Great Britain.

== 1690 ==
=== April ===
The 2nd session of the parliament of William and Mary, held in Edinburgh from 15 April 1690.

| Short title, or popular name | Citation | Royal assent |
Long title
| Statute Law Repeal Act 1690 (repealed) | April 1690 c. 1 (Note: This is the citation in the Record Edition.); 1690 c. 1 (Note: This is the citation in the Duodecimal Edition.) | 25 April 1690 |
Act Rescinding the first Act of the Second Parliament 1669. (Note: King's Supremacy Act 1669 (c. 2)); Act Rescinding the first Act of the Second Parliament of 1669. (Repealed by Statute Law Revision (Scotland) Act 1906 (6 Edw. 7. c. 38))
| Presbyterian Ministers Act 1690 (repealed) | April 1690 c. 2; 1690 c. 2 | 25 April 1690 |
Act restoreing the Presbyterian Ministers who were thrust from their Churches since the 1st of January 1661. Act restoring the Presbyterian Ministers who were thrust from their Churches since the 1st of January 1661. (Repealed by Statute Law Revision (Scotland) Act 1906 (6 Edw. 7. c. 38))
| Committees of Parliament Act 1690 (repealed) | April 1690 c. 3; 1690 c. 3 | 8 May 1690 |
Act concerning the Election of Committees of Parliament. Act concerning the Election of Committees of Parliament. (Repealed by Statute Law Revision (Scotland) Act 1906 (6 Edw. 7. c. 38))
| Oath of Allegiance Act 1690 (repealed) | April 1690 c. 4; 1690 c. 4 | 12 May 1690 |
Act appointing the oath of Allegeance to be taken by Electors of Commissioners to Parliaments or Conventions. Act appointing the oath of Allegiance to be taken by Electors of Commissioners to Parliaments or Conventions. (Repealed by Promissory Oaths Act 1871 (34 & 35 Vict. c. 48))
| Not public and general | April 1690 c. 5 — (Note: This act is not listed in the Duodecimal Edition.) | 14 May 1690 |
Decreet of Precedencie in favours of Robert Earle of Lothian against the Earle of Roxburgh and others.
| Courts of Judicature Act 1690 (repealed) | April 1690 c. 6 — | 6 June 1690 |
Act adjourning the Courts of Judicature until the first of July. Act adjourning the Courts of Judicature until the first of July. (Repealed by Statute Law Revision (Scotland) Act 1906 (6 Edw. 7. c. 38))
| Confession of Faith Ratification Act 1690 still in force or the Comprehension Act 1690 | April 1690 c. 7; 1690 c. 5 | 7 June 1690 |
Act Ratifying the Confession of Faith and settleing Presbyterian Church Government. Act Ratifying the Confession of Faith and settling Presbyterian Church Government.
| Supply Act 1690 (repealed) | April 1690 c. 8; 1690 c. 6 | 7 June 1690 |
Act for raising a Supply offered to their Majesties. Act for raising a Supply offered to their Majesties. (Repealed by Statute Law Revision (Scotland) Act 1906 (6 Edw. 7. c. 38))
| Oath of Allegiance (No. 2) Act 1690 (repealed) | April 1690 c. 9; 1690 c. 7 | 7 June 1690 |
Act ordaineing the Commissioners of Supply and their Collectors and Clerkes to take the Oath of Allegeance. Act ordaining the Commissioners of Supply and their Collectors and Clerks to take the Oath of Allegiance. (Repealed by Promissory Oaths Act 1871 (34 & 35 Vict. c. 48))
| Public Fast Act 1690 (repealed) | April 1690 c. 10 — | 13 June 1690 |
Proclamation for a Publick Fast. Proclamation for a Public Fast. (Repealed by Statute Law Revision (Scotland) Act 1906 (6 Edw. 7. c. 38))
| Oath of Allegiance (No. 3) Act 1690 (repealed) | April 1690 c. 11; 1690 c. 8 | 13 June 1690 |
Act anent the Commissioners of Supply who do not take the oath of Allegiance. Act regarding the Commissioners of Supply who do not take the oath of Allegiance. (Repealed by Statute Law Revision (Scotland) Act 1906 (6 Edw. 7. c. 38))
| Poll Money Act 1690 (repealed) | April 1690 c. 12; 1690 c. 9 | 14 June 1690 |
Act for Poll Money for relief of the Heritors. (Repealed by Statute Law Revision (Scotland) Act 1906 (6 Edw. 7. c. 38))
| Supply (No. 2) Act 1690 (repealed) | April 1690 c. 13; 1690 c. 10 | 14 June 1690 |
Act for ane Additional Supply out of the annualrent of Money. (Repealed by Statute Law Revision (Scotland) Act 1906 (6 Edw. 7. c. 38))
| Representation of Shires Act 1690 (repealed) | April 1690 c. 14; 1690 c. 11 | 14 June 1690 |
Act for ane Additional Representation in Parliament of the greater Shyres of this Kingdome. (Repealed by Statute Law Revision (Scotland) Act 1906 (6 Edw. 7. c. 38))
| Royal Burghs Act 1690 (repealed) | April 1690 c. 15; 1690 c. 12 | 14 June 1690 |
Act in favors of the Royall Burrowes. Act in favour of the Royal Burghs. (Repealed by Statute Law Revision (Scotland) Act 1906 (6 Edw. 7. c. 38))
| Hornings Act 1690 (repealed) | April 1690 c. 16; 1690 c. 13 | 14 June 1690 |
Act Dischargeing Generall Letters of horning. (Repealed by Statute Law Revision (Scotland) Act 1964 (c. 80))
| Suspect Persons Act 1690 (repealed) | April 1690 c. 17; 1690 c. 14 | 14 June 1690 |
Act Impowering the Privy Councill to put the Oath of Allegiance to suspect persons or to secure them. (Repealed by Statute Law Revision (Scotland) Act 1906 (6 Edw. 7. c. 38))
| Not public and general | April 1690 c. 18; 1690 c. 15 | 14 June 1690 |
Act in favours of the Burgh of Glasgow for electing of their Magistrates.
| Not public and general | April 1690 c. 19 — | 27 June 1690 |
Act and Decreit in favors of Robert Adair of Kinhilt against the Aires of Archbald Edmonston of Duntreath.
| Not public and general | April 1690 c. 20; 1690 c. 16 | 30 June 1690 |
Act Rescinding the Forfeiture of Andrew Fletcher of Salton.
| Not public and general | April 1690 c. 21 — | 30 June 1690 |
Act Rescinding the Forfeiture of Mr Robert Baillie of Jerviswood.
| Not public and general | April 1690 c. 22 — | 30 June 1690 |
Decreit in favors of Mr James Smith anent the building of the Canongate church.
| Sittings of Courts Act 1690 (repealed) | April 1690 c. 23 — | 30 June 1690 |
Act concerning the sitting of the Session and Inferior Courts. (Repealed by Statute Law Revision (Scotland) Act 1906 (6 Edw. 7. c. 38))
| Not public and general | April 1690 c. 24 — | 3 July 1690 |
Act in favors of George Earle of Melvill.
| Universities Act 1690 (repealed) | April 1690 c. 25; 1690 c. 17 | 4 July 1690 |
Act for visitation of Universities Colledges and Schoolls. (Repealed by Statute Law Revision (Scotland) Act 1906 (6 Edw. 7. c. 38))
| Rescission of Forfeitures Act 1690 (repealed) | April 1690 c. 26; 1690 c. 18 | 4 July 1690 |
Act Rescinding the Forefaultures and Fynes since the year 1605. (Repealed by Statute Law Revision (Scotland) Act 1906 (6 Edw. 7. c. 38))
| Not public and general | April 1690 c. 27 — | 8 July 1690 |
Decreit in favours of Sir Thomas Burnet Doctor of Medicine against Sir Alexanander Bruce of Broomhall for proving the tenor and making up of his writs.
| Not public and general | April 1690 c. 28 — | 8 July 1690 |
Act in favours of the Laird of Colloden anent his damages.
| Not public and general | April 1690 c. 29 — | 9 July 1690 |
Act and Decreit in favours of Dame Mar garet Erskine Lady Castleheaven against Sir James Foulis of Colingtoun.
| Not public and general | April 1690 c. 30 — | 10 July 1690 |
Act Rescinding the Forfaulture of George Earle of Melvill.
| Not public and general | April 1690 c. 31 — | 11 July 1690 |
Act in favours of Captain William Burnet of Balfour anent his Damages.
| Not public and general | April 1690 c. 32 — | 11 July 1690 |
Act and Protection in favours of Sir Archbald Cockburne of Langton.
| Not public and general | April 1690 c. 33 — | 11 July 1690 |
Act in favours of the Laird of McFarlane for yearly fairs at Inverioch and Tarbet.
| Not public and general | April 1690 c. 34 — | 11 July 1690 |
Act in favours of the Laird of Grant.
| Not public and general | April 1690 c. 35 — | 15 July 1690 |
Act and Protection in favors of John Rentoune of Lambertoune.
| Not public and general | April 1690 c. 36 — | 17 July 1690 |
Decreit in favors of Mr Archbald Sinclair Advocate and his spouse against Alexander Cockburn of Borthwick.
| Supply (No. 3) Act 1690 (repealed) | April 1690 c. 37 — | 18 July 1690 |
Act adding Commissioners of Supply in the shyre of Cromarty. (Repealed by Statute Law Revision (Scotland) Act 1906 (6 Edw. 7. c. 38))
| Not public and general | April 1690 c. 38 — | 18 July 1690 |
Act in favours of the Burgh of Montrose for ane annuity for a second Minister.
| Not public and general | April 1690 c. 39 — | 18 July 1690 |
Act in favors of the Burgh of Inverness anent their damages.
| Not public and general | April 1690 c. 40 — | 18 July 1690 |
Act in favours of Mr John Hamiltone of Halcraig.
| Not public and general | April 1690 c. 41 — | 18 July 1690 |
Act in favours of Mr John Monro of Fyres and Mr Simon McKenzie of Tereidan anent their damages.
| Not public and general | April 1690 c. 42 — | 18 July 1690 |
Act in favours of the Laird of McIntosh anent his damages.
| Not public and general | April 1690 c. 43 — | 18 July 1690 |
Act in favours of the Laird of McIntosh anent his Cess.
| Not public and general | April 1690 c. 44 — | 18 July 1690 |
Act in favors of Mr William Carstairs Minister.
| Glasgow Act 1690 (repealed) | April 1690 c. 45 — | 18 July 1690 |
Act in favours of the Toune of Glasgow anent the sale of some part of their Common Good. (Repealed by Statute Law Revision (Scotland) Act 1906 (6 Edw. 7. c. 38))
| Not public and general | April 1690 c. 46 — | 19 July 1690 |
Act in favours of Alexander Brand fiar of Balberton.
| Not public and general | April 1690 c. 47 — | 19 July 1690 |
Act in favours of the Viscount of Tarbat annexing the Barony of Tarbat to the shire of Cromarty.
| Dissolution Act 1690 (repealed) | April 1690 c. 48; 1690 c. 19 | 19 July 1690 |
Act of Dissolution of the forefaulted Lands annexed to the Crowne in the Reigne of the late King James. (Repealed by Statute Law Revision (Scotland) Act 1906 (6 Edw. 7. c. 38))
| Judicial Sale Act 1690 (repealed) | April 1690 c. 49; 1690 c. 20 | 19 July 1690 |
Act anent the sale of Bankrupts Lands. (Repealed by Statute Law (Repeals) Act 1973 (c. 39))
| Child Murder Act 1690 (repealed) | April 1690 c. 50; 1690 c. 21 | 19 July 1690 |
Act anent Murdering of Children. (Repealed by Concealment of Birth (Scotland) Act 1809 (49 Geo. 3. c. 14))
| Coin Act 1690 (repealed) | April 1690 c. 51 — | 19 July 1690 |
Act anent the Coynage of Copper. (Repealed by Statute Law Revision (Scotland) Act 1906 (6 Edw. 7. c. 38))
| Yule Vacance Act 1690 (repealed) | April 1690 c. 52; 1690 c. 22 | 19 July 1690 |
Act discharging the Yule Vacance. (Repealed by Yule Vacance Act 1711 (10 Ann. c. 22))
| Patronage Act 1690 (repealed) | April 1690 c. 53; 1690 c. 23 | 19 July 1690 |
Act concerning Patronages. (Repealed by Statute Law Revision (Scotland) Act 1906 (6 Edw. 7. c. 38))
| Vacant Stipends Act 1690 (repealed) | April 1690 c. 54; 1690 c. 24 | 19 July 1690 |
Act concerning Vacant Stipends in the Synod of Argyle. (Repealed by Statute Law Revision (Scotland) Act 1906 (6 Edw. 7. c. 38))
| Profaneness Act 1690 (repealed) | April 1690 c. 55; 1690 c. 25 | 19 July 1690 |
Act against Profaneness. (Repealed by Statute Law Revision (Scotland) Act 1906 (6 Edw. 7. c. 38))
| Confirmation Act 1690 still in force | April 1690 c. 56; 1690 c. 26 | 19 July 1690 |
Act anent the Confirmation of Testaments.
| Statute Law Repeal (No. 2) Act 1690 (repealed) | April 1690 c. 57; 1690 c. 27 | 19 July 1690 |
Act Rescinding the Laws for Conformity. (Repealed by Statute Law Revision (Scotland) Act 1906 (6 Edw. 7. c. 38))
| Statute Law Repeal (No. 3) Act 1690 (repealed) | April 1690 c. 58; 1690 c. 28 | 19 July 1690 |
Act Rescinding severall Acts of Parliament as useless or hurtfull. Act Rescinding several Acts of Parliament as useless or harmful. (Repealed by Statute Law Revision (Scotland) Act 1906 (6 Edw. 7. c. 38))
| Not public and general | April 1690 c. 59; 1690 c. 29 | 19 July 1690 |
Act anent the Superiority of Lands and others which formerly held of Prelates or Bishops and their Chapters to be now holden of the King and Queen.
| Recission of Forfeitures (No. 2) Act 1690 (repealed) | April 1690 c. 60; 1690 c. 31 | 19 July 1690 |
Act Rescinding Forfaultures in absence before the Justice Court preceiding the yeare 1669 and restoring Caldwell and Kersland and Mr William Veitch. (Repealed by Statute Law Revision (Scotland) Act 1906 (6 Edw. 7. c. 38))
| Udal Tenure Act 1690 (repealed) | April 1690 c. 61; 1690 c. 32 | 19 July 1690 |
Act in favours of the small vassalls of Kirklands who now hold of their Majesties. (Repealed by Abolition of Feudal Tenure etc. (Scotland) Act 2000 (asp 5))
| Poindings Act 1690 (repealed) | April 1690 c. 62 — | 19 July 1690 |
Act anent the Executione of in Galloway. (Repealed by Statute Law Revision (Scotland) Act 1906 (6 Edw. 7. c. 38))
| Teinds Act 1690 (repealed) | April 1690 c. 63; 1690 c. 30 | 19 July 1690 |
Act and Commission for Plantation of Kirks and Valuation of Teinds. (Repealed by Abolition of Feudal Tenure etc. (Scotland) Act 2000 (asp 5))
| Not public and general | April 1690 c. 64 — | 19 July 1690 |
Act in favours of Mr William Fergusone of Kaitloch.
| Not public and general | April 1690 c. 65 — | 19 July 1690 |
Act in favours of the Toune of Edinburgh anent their Toune Company.
| Not public and general | April 1690 c. 66 — | 22 July 1690 |
Act in favours of the Burgh of Anstruther wester.
| Not public and general | April 1690 c. 67 — | 22 July 1690 |
Act for holding the Commissar Court of Aberdeen at the burgh of Aberdeen.
| Not public and general | April 1690 c. 68 — | 22 July 1690 |
Act in favours of Henry Lord Cardross.
| Not public and general | April 1690 c. 69 — | 22 July 1690 |
Act in favours of the Toune of Edinburgh anent ane Impositione on wines and other commodities.
| Not public and general | April 1690 c. 70 — | 22 July 1690 |
Act in favours of Mr William McIntosh of Aberardor & others anent their damages.
| Not public and general | April 1690 c. 71 — | 22 July 1690 |
Act in favours of The Laird of McIntosh for holding of fairs and mercats in Obsdale in Ross Dunachtoune in Badzenoch and Keppach in Lochaber.
| Not public and general | April 1690 c. 72 — | 22 July 1690 |
Act Rescinding the Forfeiture of Sir George Campbell of Cessnock.
| Not public and general | April 1690 c. 73 — | 22 July 1690 |
Act in favours of Sir Collin Campbell of Aberuchill anent his damages.
| Not public and general | April 1690 c. 74 — | 22 July 1690 |
Act Rescinding the Forfeiture of Walter Earle of Tarras.
| Not public and general | April 1690 c. 75 — | 22 July 1690 |
Act Rescinding the Forfeiture of George Pringle of Torwoodlie.
| Not public and general | April 1690 c. 76 — | 22 July 1690 |
Act in favours of John Hay of Lochloy.
| Not public and general | April 1690 c. 77 — | |
Act in favours of the four Townes of Lochmaben.
| Not public and general | April 1690 c. 78 — | |
Act Rescinding the Forfeiture of Mr Gilbert Elliot.
| Not public and general | April 1690 c. 79 — | |
Ratificatione in favours of the four Trades in the Canongate.
| Not public and general | April 1690 c. 80 — | |
Act Rescinding the Forfeiture of Sir Archbald Johnstone of Wariestone.
| Not public and general | April 1690 c. 81 — | |
Act in favours of the Toune of Pasley anent repaireing of ruineous houses.
| Not public and general | April 1690 c. 82 — | |
Act in favours of the Toune of Pasley for two yearly fairs.
| Not public and general | April 1690 c. 83 — | |
Act Rescinding the Forfeiture of Sir Patrick Hume of Polwart.
| Not public and general | April 1690 c. 84 — | |
Act Dissolveing Sir Patrick Hume of Polwart his Estate from the Crowne.
| Not public and general | April 1690 c. 85 — | |
Act Rescinding the Forfeiture of William Lowrie of Blaikwood.
| Not public and general | April 1690 c. 86 — | |
Act Rescinding the Forfeiture of Mr James Guthrie Minister.
| Not public and general | April 1690 c. 87 — | |
Act in favours of William Baillie of Lamington for two yearly fairs and a weekly mercat at Painstone.
| Not public and general | April 1690 c. 88 — | |
Act in favors of Christian Ross relict of Andrew Fearne of Pitcallion anent her damages.
| Not public and general | April 1690 c. 89 — | |
Act rescinding the Forfeiture of James Stewart Advocate.
| Not public and general | April 1690 c. 90 — | |
Act in favors of George Fullertone of Dreghorne burdening the estate of Freugh with 44000 merks.
| Not public and general | April 1690 c. 91 — | |
Act Rescinding the Forfeiture of William Denholme of Westshiells.
| Not public and general | April 1690 c. 92 — | |
Act Rescinding the Forfeiture of William Denholme of Westshiells.
| Not public and general | April 1690 c. 93 — | |
Act Rescinding the Forfeiture of Sir Thomas Stewart of Coltness.
| Not public and general | April 1690 c. 94 — | |
Act in favors of the Laird of Colloden anent the valuatione of his Lands of Ferrintoshe.
| Not public and general | April 1690 c. 95; 1690 c. 41 | |
Act Rescinding the Forfeiture of the deceist John Swintone of that Ilk.
| Annual Rents Act 1690 (repealed) | April 1690 c. 96; 1690 c. 42 | |
Act anent the retoured duty of Annual rents. (Repealed by Statute Law Revision (Scotland) Act 1906 (6 Edw. 7. c. 38))
| Prescription Act 1690 (repealed) | April 1690 c. 97; 1690 c. 40 | |
Act anent short Prescriptions of Adjudications and others. (Repealed by Statute Law Revision (Scotland) Act 1906 (6 Edw. 7. c. 38))
| Removings Act 1690 (repealed) | April 1690 c. 98; 1690 c. 39 | |
Act anent Removing from Land. (Repealed by Statute Law Revision (Scotland) Act 1906 (6 Edw. 7. c. 38))
| Security of Government Act 1690 (repealed) | April 1690 c. 99; 1690 c. 38 | |
Act for Security of their Majesties Government. (Repealed by Statute Law Revision (Scotland) Act 1906 (6 Edw. 7. c. 38))
| Army Act 1690 (repealed) | April 1690 c. 100; 1690 c. 37 | |
Act anent persons killed in the Kings Host. (Repealed by Statute Law Revision (Scotland) Act 1906 (6 Edw. 7. c. 38))
| Mint Act 1690 (repealed) | April 1690 c. 101; 1690 c. 36 | |
Act anent the Mint. (Repealed by Statute Law Revision (Scotland) Act 1906 (6 Edw. 7. c. 38))
| Ministers Act 1690 (repealed) | April 1690 c. 102; 1690 c. 35 | |
Act anent Ministers that have not prayed for the King and Queen. (Repealed by Statute Law Revision (Scotland) Act 1906 (6 Edw. 7. c. 38))
| Fishery Act 1690 (repealed) | April 1690 c. 103; 1690 c. 34 | |
Act annulling the gift of Erection of the Royall Company of the Fishery. (Repealed by Statute Law Revision (Scotland) Act 1906 (6 Edw. 7. c. 38))
| Persons Forfeited Act 1690 (repealed) | April 1690 c. 104; 1690 c. 33 | |
Act for security of the Creditors Vassalls and heirs of Entail of persons forefaulted. (Repealed by Statute Law Revision (Scotland) Act 1906 (6 Edw. 7. c. 38))
| Process of Treason Act 1690 (repealed) | April 1690 c. 105; 1690 c. 43 | |
Remit of the Proces of Treason to the Lords of Justiciary. (Repealed by Statute Law Revision (Scotland) Act 1906 (6 Edw. 7. c. 38))
| Not public and general | April 1690 c. 106 — | |
Act in favours of Mr John Dempster of Pitliver against the Earle of Airlie.
| Not public and general | April 1690 c. 107 — | |
Act of Dissolution in favors of the Earle of Melvill.
| Not public and general | April 1690 c. 108 — | |
Act Rescinding the Forfeiture of Robert Hamilton of Monkland.
| Not public and general | April 1690 c. 109 — | |
Act in favours of the Burgh of Culross anent their stenting of themselves for Payment of the Towns Debts.
| Saving the Rights Act 1690 Not public and general | April 1690 c. 110; 1690 c. 44 | |
Act Salvo Jure. Act Salvo Jure.
| Adjournment Act 1690 (repealed) | Vol. IX, p. 230; 1690 c. 45 | |
Act of adjournment. Act of adjournment. (Repealed by Statute Law Revision (Scotland) Act 1906 (6 Edw. 7. c. 38))

=== September ===
The 3rd session of the parliament of William and Mary, held in Edinburgh from 3 September 1690 until 10 September 1690.

| Short title, or popular name | Citation | Royal assent |
Long title
| Not public and general | September 1690 c. 1 (Note: This is the citation in the Record Edition.) — (Note: This act is not listed in the Duodecimal Edition.) | 9 September 1690 |
Act for ane weekly mercat and three faires yearly at Inuerlochie. Act for a weekly market and three fairs yearly at Inverlochy.
| Highland Depredations Act 1690 (repealed) | September 1690 c. 2; 1690 c. 4 (Note: This is the citation in the Duodecimal Edition.) | 10 September 1690 |
Act for Repressing the Depredations in the Highlands. Act for Repressing the Depredations in the Highlands. (Repealed by Statute Law Revision (Scotland) Act 1906 (6 Edw. 7. c. 38))
| Robbing the Packet Act 1690 (repealed) | September 1690 c. 3; 1690 c. 3 | 10 September 1690 |
Act against robbing of the Pacquet. Act against robbing of the Packet. (Repealed by Statute Law Revision (Scotland) Act 1906 (6 Edw. 7. c. 38))
| Not public and general | September 1690 c. 4 — | 10 September 1690 |
Act in favours of Sir Alexander Hope of Kerse. Act in favour of Sir Alexander Hope of Kerse.
| Supply (No. 4) Act 1690 (repealed) | September 1690 c. 5; 1690 c. 2 | 10 September 1690 |
Act and Offer to Their Majesties of Three Moneths Cess and Hearth money in liew of the sixth part of Annuallrents. Act and Offer to Their Majesties of Three Months' Cess and Hearth-money in lieu of the sixth part of Annualrents. (Repealed by Statute Law Revision (Scotland) Act 1906 (6 Edw. 7. c. 38))
| Absent Members Act 1690 (repealed) | September 1690 c. 6; 1690 c. 1 | 10 September 1690 |
Act for unlawing and amerciating Members absent from Parliaments or Conventions of Estates or from the dyets thereof. Act for fining and punishing Members absent from Parliaments or Conventions of Estates or from the meetings thereof. (Repealed by Statute Law Revision (Scotland) Act 1906 (6 Edw. 7. c. 38))
| Supply (No. 5) Act 1690 (repealed) | September 1690 c. 7 — | 10 September 1690 |
Act appointing the Commissioners of Supply to meet at the Michaelmas head Court. Act appointing the Commissioners of Supply to meet at the Michaelmas head Court. (Repealed by Statute Law Revision (Scotland) Act 1906 (6 Edw. 7. c. 38))
| Supply (No. 6) Act 1690 (repealed) | September 1690 c. 8 — | 10 September 1690 |
Act for Electing Additionall Commissioners in some Shyres. Act for Electing Additional Commissioners in some Shires. (Repealed by Statute Law Revision (Scotland) Act 1906 (6 Edw. 7. c. 38))
| Not public and general | September 1690 c. 9 — | 10 September 1690 |
Act Salvo Jure. Act Salvo Jure.
| Adjournment (No. 2) Act 1690 (repealed) | Vol. IX, p. 238; 1690 c. 6 | 10 September 1690 |
Act of adjournment. Act of adjournment. (Repealed by Statute Law Revision (Scotland) Act 1906 (6 Edw. 7. c. 38))

=== Sources ===
- Alexander, William (1841). "Acta Parliamentorum Gulielmi et Mariæ". An Abridgement of the Acts of the Parliaments of Scotland. Edinburgh: Adam and Charles Black. pp. A77–A79 – via Google Books.
- Alexander, William (1841). "Acta Parliamentorum Gulielmi et Mariæ". An Abridgement of the Acts of the Parliaments of Scotland. Edinburgh: Adam and Charles Black. pp. A77–A79 – via Google Books.
- Chronological Table of the Statutes. London: Her Majesty's Stationery Office. 1972. pp. 1360–1362 – via Google Books.
- "Acts of the Old Scottish Parliament: 1690". legislation.gov.uk. The National Archives.
- "Index of Statutes: Index of Statutes: William II and Mary II (1689-1694)". Records of the Parliaments of Scotland to 1707. University of St Andrews.

== See also ==
- List of legislation in the United Kingdom
- Records of the Parliaments of Scotland
