= List of Scottish statutory instruments, 2003 =

This is a complete list of Scottish statutory instruments in 2003.

== 1-100 ==
- Cairngorms National Park Designation, Transitional and Consequential Provisions (Scotland) Order 2003 (S.S.I. 2003/1)
- Cairngorms National Park Elections (Scotland) Order 2003 (S.S.I. 2003/2)
- Plastic Materials and Articles in Contact with Food (Amendment) (Scotland) Regulations 2003 (S.S.I. 2003/9)
- Education (Disability Strategies) (Scotland) Amendment Regulations 2003 (S.S.I. 2003/10)
- National Health Service (General Medical Services) (Scotland) Amendment Regulations 2003 (S.S.I. 2003/11)
- Food Protection (Emergency Prohibitions) (Amnesic Shellfish Poisoning) (West Coast) (No. 6) (Scotland) Order 2002 Revocation Order 2003 (S.S.I. 2003/17)
- Food Protection (Emergency Prohibitions) (Amnesic Shellfish Poisoning) (West Coast) (No. 15) (Scotland) Order 2002 Revocation Order 2003 (S.S.I. 2003/18)
- Intercountry Adoption (Hague Convention) (Scotland) Regulations 2003 (S.S.I. 2003/19)
- Police and Police (Special Constables) (Scotland) Amendment Regulations 2003 (S.S.I. 2003/21)
- Food Protection (Emergency Prohibitions) (Amnesic Shellfish Poisoning) (West Coast) (No. 13) (Scotland) Order 2002 Partial Revocation Order 2003 (S.S.I. 2003/22)
- Food Protection (Emergency Prohibitions) (Amnesic Shellfish Poisoning) (West Coast) (No. 12) (Scotland) Order 2002 Revocation Order 2003 (S.S.I. 2003/23)
- Food Protection (Emergency Prohibitions) (Amnesic Shellfish Poisoning) (West Coast) (No. 14) (Scotland) Order 2002 Revocation Order 2003 (S.S.I. 2003/24)
- Act of Sederunt (Ordinary Cause Rules) Amendment (Form of Simplified Divorce Application) 2003 (S.S.I. 2003/25)
- Act of Sederunt (Ordinary Cause, Summary Application, Summary Cause and Small Claim Rules) Amendment (Miscellaneous) 2003 (S.S.I. 2003/26)
- Act of Sederunt (Summary Applications, Statutory Applications and Appeals etc. Rules) Amendment (International Criminal Court) 2003 (S.S.I. 2003/27)
- Tobacco Advertising and Promotion (Sponsorship Transitional Provisions) (Scotland) Regulations 2003 (S.S.I. 2003/34)
- Local Government Finance (Scotland) Order 2003 (S.S.I. 2003/42)
- Act of Sederunt (Child Care and Maintenance Rules) Amendment (1993 Hague Convention Adoption) 2003 (S.S.I. 2003/44)
- Extended Sentences for Violent Offenders (Scotland) Order 2003 (S.S.I. 2003/48)
- Civil Legal Aid (Scotland) Amendment Regulations 2003 (S.S.I. 2003/49)
- Regulation of Investigatory Powers (Prescription of Offices, Ranks and Positions) (Scotland) Amendment (No. 2) Order 2003 (S.S.I. 2003/50)
- Action Programme for Nitrate Vulnerable Zones (Scotland) Regulations 2003 (S.S.I. 2003/51)
- Nitrate Vulnerable Zones (Grants) (Scotland) Scheme 2003 (S.S.I. 2003/52)
- Animal By-Products (Identification) Amendment (Scotland) Regulations 2003 (S.S.I. 2003/53)
- Housing Revenue Account General Fund Contribution Limits (Scotland) Order 2003 (S.S.I. 2003/54)
- National Health Service Superannuation Scheme (Scotland) Amendment Regulations 2003 (S.S.I. 2003/55)
- Sea Fishing (Restriction on Days at Sea) (Scotland) Order 2003 (S.S.I. 2003/56)
- Community Care and Health (Scotland) Act 2002 (Commencement No. 2) Order 2003 (S.S.I. 2003/62)
- Community Care and Health (Scotland) Act 2002 (Transitional Provisions) Order 2003 (S.S.I. 2003/63)
- National Health Service (General Medical Services Supplementary Lists) (Scotland) Regulations 2003 (S.S.I. 2003/64)
- Domestic Water and Sewerage Charges (Reduction) (Scotland) Regulations 2003 (S.S.I. 2003/65)
- Sea Fishing (Restriction on Days at Sea) (Scotland) Amendment Order 2003 (S.S.I. 2003/66)
- Registration of Foreign Adoptions (Scotland) Regulations 2003 (S.S.I. 2003/67)
- National Assistance (Assessment of Resources) Amendment (Scotland) Regulations 2003 (S.S.I. 2003/69)
- Road Traffic (Permitted Parking Area and Special Parking Area) (Aberdeen City Council) Designation Order 2003 (S.S.I. 2003/70)
- Road Traffic (Parking Adjudicators) (Aberdeen City Council) Regulations 2003 (S.S.I. 2003/71)
- Parking Attendants (Wearing of Uniforms) (Aberdeen City Council Parking Area) Regulations 2003 (S.S.I. 2003/72)
- Taxi Drivers' Licences (Carrying of Guide Dogs and Hearing Dogs) (Scotland) Regulations 2003 (S.S.I. 2003/73)
- Ethical Standards in Public Life etc. (Scotland) Act 2000 (Commencement No. 3) Order 2003 (S.S.I. 2003/74)
- The Schools (Scotland) Code Amendment Regulations 2003 (S.S.I. 2003/75)
- Representation of the People (Variation of Limits of Candidates' Local Government Election Expenses) (Scotland) Order 2003 76)
- Sea Fish (Prohibited Methods of Fishing) (Firth of Clyde) Order 2003 (S.S.I. 2003/79)
- The Tobacco Advertising and Promotion Act 2002 (Commencement No. 4) (Scotland) (Amendment and Transitional Provisions) Order 2003 (S.S.I. 2003/80)
- Food Protection (Emergency Prohibitions) (Amnesic Shellfish Poisoning) (West Coast) (No. 11) (Scotland) Order 2002 Revocation Order 2003 (S.S.I. 2003/81)
- Standards in Scotland's Schools etc. Act 2000 (Commencement No. 6) Order 2003 (S.S.I. 2003/84)
- Surface Waters (Fishlife) (Classification) (Scotland) Amendment Regulations 2003 (S.S.I. 2003/85)
- National Assistance (Sums for Personal Requirements) (Scotland) Regulations 2003 (S.S.I. 2003/86)
- Fishing Vessels (Decommissioning) (Scotland) Scheme 2003 (S.S.I. 2003/87)
- Sea Fishing (Enforcement of Community Quota and Third Country Fishing Measures) (Scotland) Order 2003 (S.S.I. 2003/88)
- Births, Deaths, Marriages and Divorces (Fees) (Scotland) Amendment Regulations 2003 (S.S.I. 2003/89)
- Food Protection (Emergency Prohibitions) (Amnesic Shellfish Poisoning) (West Coast) (No. 13) (Scotland) Order 2002 Partial Revocation (No. 2) Order 2003 (S.S.I. 2003/90)
- Bluetongue (Scotland) Order 2003 (S.S.I. 2003/91)
- Proceeds of Crime Act 2002 (Disclosure of Information to and by Lord Advocate and Scottish Ministers) Order 2003 (S.S.I. 2003/93)
- Proceeds of Crime Act 2002 (Investigations: Code of Practice) (Scotland) Order 2003 (S.S.I. 2003/94)
- Child Support Appeals (Jurisdiction of Courts) (Scotland) Order 2003 (S.S.I. 2003/96)
- Sheriff Court Fees Amendment Order 2003 (S.S.I. 2003/97)
- Act of Sederunt (Summary Applications, Statutory Applications and Appeals etc. Rules) Amendment (No. 6) (Proceeds of Crime Act 2002) 2003 (S.S.I. 2003/98)
- Sea Fish (Prohibited Methods of Fishing) (Firth of Clyde) Amendment Order 2003 (S.S.I. 2003/100)

== 101-200 ==
- Feeding Stuffs (Scotland) Amendment Regulations 2003 (S.S.I. 2003/101)
- Tobacco Advertising and Promotion Act 2002 (Commencement No. 5) (Scotland) Order 2003 (S.S.I. 2003/113)
- Food Protection (Emergency Prohibitions) (Amnesic Shellfish Poisoning) (West Coast) (No. 13) (Scotland) Order 2002 Revocation Order 2003 (S.S.I. 2003/115)
- Sea Fishing (Transitional Support) (Scotland) (No. 2) Scheme 2003 (S.S.I. 2003/116)
- Pesticides (Maximum Residue Levels in Crops, Food and Feeding Stuffs) (Scotland) Amendment Regulations 2003 (S.S.I. 2003/118)
- Ethical Standards in Public Life etc. (Scotland) Act 2000 (Devolved Public Bodies) Order 2003 (S.S.I. 2003/119)
- Act of Adjournal (Criminal Procedure Rules Amendment) (Proceeds of Crime Act 2002) 2003 (S.S.I. 2003/120)
- Adoption (Intercountry Aspects) Act 1999 (Commencement No. 10) (Scotland) Order 2003 (S.S.I. 2003/121)
- Ethical Standards in Public Life etc. (Scotland) Act 2000 (Stipulated Time Limit) Order 2003 (S.S.I. 2003/122)
- Non-Domestic Rate (Scotland) Order 2003 (S.S.I. 2003/123)
- Strathclyde Passenger Transport Authority (Constitution, Membership and Transitional and Consequential Provisions) Amendment Order 2003 (S.S.I. 2003/128)
- Less Favoured Area Support Scheme (Scotland) Regulations 2003 (S.S.I. 2003/129)
- National Health Service (Charges for Drugs and Appliances) (Scotland) Amendment Regulations 2003 (S.S.I. 2003/130)
- National Health Service (General Dental Services) (Scotland) Amendment Regulations 2003 (S.S.I. 2003/131)
- Miscellaneous Food Additives (Amendment) (Scotland) Regulations 2003 (S.S.I. 2003/132)
- Local Government in Scotland Act 2003 (Commencement No.1) Order 2003 (S.S.I. 2003/134)
- Ethical Standards in Public Life etc. (Scotland) Act 2000 (Register of Interests) Regulations 2003 (S.S.I. 2003/135)
- Adults with Incapacity (Scotland) Act 2000 (Commencement No. 3) Order 2003 (S.S.I. 2003/136)
- Council Tax (Liability of Owners) (Scotland) Amendment Regulations 2003 (S.S.I. 2003/137)
- Local Government Pension Scheme (Management and Investment of Funds) (Scotland) Amendment Regulations 2003 (S.S.I. 2003/138)
- Natural Mineral Water, Spring Water and Bottled Drinking Water (Amendment) (Scotland) Regulations 2003 (S.S.I. 2003/139)
- Housing (Scotland) Act 2001 (Payments out of Grants for Housing Support Services) Order 2003 (S.S.I. 2003/140)
- Non-Domestic Rating (Rural Areas and Rateable Value Limits) (Scotland) Amendment Order 2003 (S.S.I. 2003/141)
- Non-Domestic Rating (Former Agricultural Premises) (Scotland) Order 2003 (S.S.I. 2003/142)
- Valuation (Stud Farms) (Scotland) Order 2003 (S.S.I. 2003/143)
- Cinematograph (Safety) (Scotland) Amendment Regulations 2003 (S.S.I. 2003/144)
- Fish Labelling (Scotland) Regulations 2003 (S.S.I. 2003/145)
- Pollution Prevention and Control (Scotland) Amendment Regulations 2003 (S.S.I. 2003/146)
- Council Tax (Supply of Information) (Scotland) Regulations 2003 (S.S.I. 2003/147)
- Regulation of Care (Registration and Registers) (Scotland) Amendment Regulations 2003 (S.S.I. 2003/148)
- Regulation of Care (Requirements as to Care Services) (Scotland) Amendment Regulations 2003 (S.S.I. 2003/149)
- Regulation of Care (Requirements as to Limited Registration Services) (Scotland) Regulations 2003 (S.S.I. 2003/150)
- Regulation of Care (Applications and Provision of Advice) (Scotland) Amendment Order 2003 (S.S.I. 2003/151)
- Regulation of Care (Fees) (Scotland) Order 2003 (S.S.I. 2003/152)
- NHS Health Scotland (Transfer of Officers) Regulations 2003 (S.S.I. 2003/153)
- Health Education Board for Scotland Amendment Order 2003 (S.S.I. 2003/154)
- Adults with Incapacity (Management of Residents' Finances) (Scotland) Regulations 2003 (S.S.I. 2003/155)
- National Assistance (Assessment of Resources) Amendment (No. 2) (Scotland) Regulations 2003 (S.S.I. 2003/156)
- Budget (Scotland) Act 2002 Amendment Order 2003 (S.S.I. 2003/157)
- National Health Service (Dental Charges) (Scotland) Regulations 2003 (S.S.I. 2003/158)
- National Health Service (Functions of the Common Services Agency) (Scotland) Amendment Order 2003 (S.S.I. 2003/159)
- Non-Domestic Rates (Levying) (Scotland) Regulations 2003 (S.S.I. 2003/160)
- Housing Support Grant (Scotland) Order 2003 (S.S.I. 2003/161)
- Act of Sederunt (Fees of Solicitors in the Sheriff Court) (Amendment) 2003 (S.S.I. 2003/162)
- Advice and Assistance (Scotland) Amendment Regulations 2003 (S.S.I. 2003/163)
- Common Agricultural Policy (Wine) (Scotland) Amendment Regulations 2003 (S.S.I. 2003/164)
- Products of Animal Origin (Third Country Imports) (Scotland) Amendment Regulations 2003 (S.S.I. 2003/165)
- Prohibition of Fishing with Multiple Trawls (No. 2) (Scotland) Amendment Order 2003 (S.S.I. 2003/166)
- Sea Fish (Specified Sea Areas) (Regulation of Nets and Other Fishing Gear) (Scotland) Amendment Order 2003 (S.S.I. 2003/167)
- Anti-Pollution Works (Scotland) Regulations 2003 (S.S.I. 2003/168)
- Action Programme for Nitrate Vulnerable Zones (Scotland) Amendment Regulations 2003 (S.S.I. 2003/169)
- Waste Incineration (Scotland) Regulations 2003 (S.S.I. 2003/170)
- Waste Management Licensing Amendment (Scotland) Regulations 2003 (S.S.I. 2003/171)
- Police Grant (Scotland) Order 2003 (S.S.I. 2003/172)
- Financial Assistance for Environmental Purposes (Scotland) Order 2003 (S.S.I. 2003/173)
- Zoo Licensing Act 1981 Amendment (Scotland) Regulations 2003 (S.S.I. 2003/174)
- Planning and Compensation Act 1991 (Amendment of Schedule 18) (Scotland) Order 2003 (S.S.I. 2003/175)
- Council Tax (Discounts) (Scotland) Consolidation and Amendment Order 2003 (S.S.I. 2003/176)
- Rural Stewardship Scheme (Scotland) Amendment Regulations 2003 (S.S.I. 2003/177)
- Civil Legal Aid (Scotland) (Fees) Amendment Regulations 2003 (S.S.I. 2003/178)
- Advice and Assistance (Assistance by Way of Representation) (Scotland) Regulations 2003 (S.S.I. 2003/179)
- Advice and Assistance (Financial Conditions) (Scotland) Regulations 2003 (S.S.I. 2003/180)
- The Regulation of Investigatory Powers (Covert Human Intelligence Sources - Code of Practice) (Scotland) Order 2003 (S.S.I. 2003/181)
- Civil Legal Aid (Financial Conditions) (Scotland) Regulations 2003 (S.S.I. 2003/182)
- Regulation of Investigatory Powers (Covert Surveillance - Code of Practice) (Scotland) Order 2003 (S.S.I. 2003/183)
- Members of the Parole Board (Removal Tribunal) Regulations 2003 (S.S.I. 2003/184)
- Pollution Prevention and Control (Designation of Landfill Directive) (Scotland) Order 2003 (S.S.I. 2003/185)
- Water Undertakings (Rateable Values) (Scotland) Order 2003 (S.S.I. 2003/187)
- The Non-Domestic Rating (Petrol Filling Stations, Public Houses and Hotels) (Scotland) Order 2003 (S.S.I. 2003/188)
- Borders and Dumfries and Galloway National Health Service Trusts (Dissolution) Order 2003 (S.S.I. 2003/189)
- Shetland Islands Council (Papa Stour and Fetlar) Harbour Revision Order 2003 (S.S.I. 2003/190)
- Act of Sederunt (Rules of the Court of Session Amendment) (Fees of Solicitors) 2003 (S.S.I. 2003/194)
- Food Protection (Emergency Prohibitions) (Amnesic Shellfish Poisoning) (West Coast) (No. 16) (Scotland) Order 2002 Revocation Order 2003 (S.S.I. 2003/195)
- Food Protection (Emergency Prohibitions) (Amnesic Shellfish Poisoning) (Orkney) (No. 3) (Scotland) Order 2002 Revocation Order 2003 (S.S.I. 2003/197)
- TSE (Scotland) Amendment Regulations 2003 (S.S.I. 2003/198)
- Ethical Standards in Public Life etc. (Scotland) Act 2000 (Modification of Enactments) Order 2003 (S.S.I. 2003/199)

== 201-300 ==
- National Health Service (General Ophthalmic Services) (Scotland) Amendment Regulations 2003 (S.S.I. 2003/201)
- Sheep Scab (Shetland Islands) Order 2003 (S.S.I. 2003/202)
- Ethical Standards in Public Life etc. (Scotland) Act 2000 (Register of Interests) Amendment Regulations 2003 (S.S.I. 2003/203)
- Pollution Prevention and Control (Designation of Waste Incineration Directive) (Scotland) Order 2003 (S.S.I. 2003/204)
- Regulation of Care (Scotland) Act 2001 (Commencement No. 3 and Transitional Provisions) Order 2003 (S.S.I. 2003/205)
- Environment Act 1995 (Commencement No. 21) (Scotland) Order 2003 (S.S.I. 2003/206)
- Access to Justice Act 1999 (Commencement No. 9 and Transitional Provisions) (Scotland) Order 2003 (S.S.I. 2003/207)
- SFGS Farmland Premium Scheme 2003 (S.S.I. 2003/209)
- Proceeds of Crime Act 2002 (Commencement No. 6, Transitional Provisions and Savings) (Scotland) Order 2003 (S.S.I. 2003/210)
- Lerwick Harbour Revision (Constitution) Order 2003 (S.S.I. 2003/211)
- Road Traffic (Vehicle Emissions) (Fixed Penalty) (Scotland) Regulations 2003 (S.S.I. 2003/212)
- National Health Service (Constitution of Health Boards) (Scotland) Amendment Order 2003 (S.S.I. 2003/217)
- National Health Service (Optical Charges and Payments) (Scotland) Amendment (No. 2) Regulations 2003 (S.S.I. 2003/218)
- Public Appointments and Public Bodies etc. (Scotland) Act 2003 (Commencement No. 1) Order 2003 (S.S.I. 2003/219)
- Police (Scotland) Amendment (No. 2) Regulations 2003 (S.S.I. 2003/220)
- Pollution Prevention and Control (Scotland) Amendment (No. 2) Regulations 2003 (S.S.I. 2003/221)
- Act of Sederunt (Rules of the Court of Session Amendment No. 2) (Proceeds of Crime Act 2002) 2003 (S.S.I. 2003/222)
- Act of Sederunt (Rules of the Court of Session Amendment No. 3) (Applications under the Nationality, Immigration and Asylum Act 2002) 2003 (S.S.I. 2003/223)
- Plant Health (Great Britain) Amendment (Scotland) Order 2003 (S.S.I. 2003/224)
- Products of Animal Origin (Third Country Imports) (Scotland) Amendment (No. 2) Regulations 2003 (S.S.I. 2003/225)
- Adults with Incapacity (Management of Residents' Finances) (Scotland) Revocation Regulations 2003 (S.S.I. 2003/226)
- Adults with Incapacity (Scotland) Act 2000 (Commencement No. 3) Partial Revocation Order 2003 (S.S.I. 2003/227)
- Disease Control (Interim Measures) (Scotland) Amendment Order 2003 (S.S.I. 2003/228)
- Pet Travel Scheme (Scotland) Order 2003 (S.S.I. 2003/229)
- Kyle of Sutherland Salmon Fishery District (Baits and Lures) Regulations 2003 (S.S.I. 2003/230)
- Rehabilitation of Offenders Act 1974 (Exclusions and Exceptions) (Scotland) Order 2003 (S.S.I. 2003/231)
- The General Commissioners of Income Tax (Expenses) (Scotland) Regulations 2003 (S.S.I. 2003/223)
- Act of Sederunt (Fees in the National Archives of Scotland) 2003 (S.S.I. 2003/234)
- Landfill (Scotland) Regulations 2003 (S.S.I. 2003/235)
- Scottish Public Services Ombudsman Act 2002 (Consequential Modification of Instruments) Order 2003 (S.S.I. 2003/242)
- Community Care (Direct Payments) (Scotland) Regulations 2003 (S.S.I. 2003/243)
- Food Protection (Emergency Prohibitions) (Amnesic Shellfish Poisoning) (West Coast) (Scotland) Order 2003 (S.S.I. 2003/244)
- Food Protection (Emergency Prohibitions) (Amnesic Shellfish Poisoning) (West Coast) (No. 2) (Scotland) Order 2003 (S.S.I. 2003/245)
- Act of Sederunt (Fees of Shorthand Writers in the Sheriff Court) (Amendment) 2003 (S.S.I. 2003/246)
- Act of Sederunt (Rules of the Court of Session Amendment No. 4) (Fees of Shorthand Writers) 2003 (S.S.I. 2003/247)
- Agricultural Holdings (Scotland) Act 2003 (Commencement No. 1) Order 2003 (S.S.I. 2003/248)
- Criminal Legal Aid (Youth Courts) (Scotland) Regulations 2003 (S.S.I. 2003/249)
- Montrose Port Authority Harbour Revision (Constitution) Order 2003 (S.S.I. 2003/258)
- The Lanarkshire Primary Care National Health Service Trust (Establishment) Amendment Order 2003 (S.S.I. 2003/259)
- Food Protection (Emergency Prohibitions) (Amnesic Shellfish Poisoning) (Orkney) (Scotland) Order 2003 (S.S.I. 2003/260)
- Act of Sederunt (Summary Applications, Statutory Applications and Appeals etc. Rules) Amendment (Immigration and Asylum) 2003 (S.S.I. 2003/261)
- Tobacco Advertising and Promotion (Sponsorship Transitional Provisions) (Scotland) Amendment Regulations 2003 (S.S.I. 2003/265)
- Adults with Incapacity (Management of Residents' Finances) (No. 2) (Scotland) Regulations 2003 (S.S.I. 2003/266)
- The Adults with Incapacity (Scotland) Act 2000 (Commencement No. 4) Order 2003 (S.S.I. 2003/267)
- Litter (Fixed Penalty) (Scotland) Order 2003 (S.S.I. 2003/268)
- National Health Service Superannuation Scheme (Scotland) Amendment (No. 2) Regulations 2003 (S.S.I. 2003/270)
- Urban Waste Water Treatment (Scotland) Amendment Regulations 2003 (S.S.I. 2003/273)
- Sweeteners in Food Amendment (Scotland) Regulations 2003 (S.S.I. 2003/274)
- Feeding Stuffs (Miscellaneous Amendments) (Scotland) Regulations 2003 (S.S.I. 2003/277)
- Food Supplements (Scotland) Regulations 2003 (S.S.I. 2003/278)
- Ethical Standards in Public Life etc. (Scotland) Act 2000 (Devolved Public Bodies) (No. 2) Order 2003 (S.S.I. 2003/279)
- St Mary's Music School (Aided Places) (Scotland) Amendment Regulations 2003 (S.S.I. 2003/280)
- Education (Assisted Places) (Scotland) Amendment Regulations 2003 (S.S.I. 2003/281)
- Road User Charging (Classes of Motor Vehicles) (Scotland) Regulations 2003 (S.S.I. 2003/282)
- Agricultural Wages (Scotland) Act 1949 Amendment Regulations 2003 (S.S.I. 2003/283)
- Home Energy Efficiency Scheme Amendment (Scotland) Regulations 2003 (S.S.I. 2003/284)
- Education (Student Loans) Amendment (Scotland) Regulations 2003 (S.S.I. 2003/285)
- Accountability of Local Authorities (Publication of Information about Finance and Performance) (Scotland) Regulations 2003 (S.S.I. 2003/286)
- Criminal Justice (Scotland) Act 2003 (Saving and Transitional Provisions) Order 2003 (S.S.I. 2003/287)
- Criminal Justice (Scotland) Act 2003 (Commencement No. 1) Order 2003 (S.S.I. 2003/288)
- Contaminants in Food (Scotland) Regulations 2003 (S.S.I. 2003/289)
- Drugs Courts (Scotland) Order 2003 (S.S.I. 2003/290)
- Cocoa and Chocolate Products (Scotland) Regulations 2003 (S.S.I. 2003/291)
- Road User Charging (Consultation and Publication) (Scotland) Regulations 2003 (S.S.I. 2003/292)
- Fruit Juices and Fruit Nectars (Scotland) Regulations 2003 (S.S.I. 2003/293)
- Agricultural Holdings (Relevant Date and Relevant Period) (Scotland) Order 2003 (S.S.I. 2003/294)
- National Health Service (Charges for Drugs and Appliances) (Scotland) Amendment (No. 2) Regulations 2003 (S.S.I. 2003/295)
- National Health Service (Pharmaceutical Services) (Scotland) Amendment Regulations 2003 (S.S.I. 2003/296)
- Stevenson College (Change of Name) (Scotland) Order 2003 (S.S.I. 2003/297)
- National Health Service (General Medical Services Supplementary Lists) (Scotland) Amendment Regulations 2003 (S.S.I. 2003/298)
- Collagen and Gelatine (Intra-Community Trade) (Scotland) Regulations 2003 (S.S.I. 2003/299)
- Sea Fishing (Restriction on Days at Sea) (Scotland) Amendment (No. 2) Order 2003 (S.S.I. 2003/300)

== 301-400 ==
- Cremation (Scotland) Amendment Regulations 2003 (S.S.I. 2003/301)
- Agricultural Subsidies (Appeals) (Scotland) Amendment Regulations 2003 (S.S.I. 2003/302)
- Rural Stewardship Scheme (Scotland) Amendment (No. 2) Regulations 2003 (S.S.I. 2003/303)
- Oil and Fibre Plant Seeds Amendment (Scotland) Regulations 2003 (S.S.I. 2003/304)
- Agricultural Holdings (Scotland) Act 2003 (Commencement No. 2) Order 2003 (S.S.I. 2003/305)
- National Health Service (Functions of the Common Services Agency) (Scotland) Amendment (No. 2) Order 2003 (S.S.I. 2003/306)
- National Health Service (General Medical Services) (Scotland) Amendment (No. 2) Regulations 2003 (S.S.I. 2003/310)
- Condensed Milk and Dried Milk (Scotland) Regulations 2003 (S.S.I. 2003/311)
- Feeding Stuffs (Scotland) Amendment (No. 2) Regulations 2003 (S.S.I. 2003/312)
- Improvement and Repairs Grant (Prescribed Valuation Band) (Scotland) Order 2003 (S.S.I. 2003/314)
- Food Protection (Emergency Prohibitions) (Amnesic Shellfish Poisoning) (West Coast) (Scotland) Partial Revocation Order 2003 (S.S.I. 2003/315)
- Mental Health (Care and Treatment) (Scotland) Act 2003 (Commencement No. 1) Order 2003 (S.S.I. 2003/316)
- Act of Sederunt (Summary Applications, Statutory Applications and Appeals etc. Rules) Amendment (Anti social Behaviour Orders) 2003 (S.S.I. 2003/319)
- Food Protection (Emergency Prohibitions) (Amnesic Shellfish Poisoning) (Orkney) (No. 2) (Scotland) Order 2003 (S.S.I. 2003/321)
- Argyll and Clyde National Health Service Trusts (Dissolution) Order 2003 (S.S.I. 2003/325)
- Collagen and Gelatine (Intra-Community Trade) (Scotland) Amendment Regulations 2003 (S.S.I. 2003/328)
- Budget (Scotland) Act 2003 Amendment Order 2003 (S.S.I. 2003/330)
- Water Industry (Scotland) Act 2002 (Consequential Provisions) Order 2003 (S.S.I. 2003/331)
- Products of Animal Origin (Third Country Imports) (Scotland) Amendment (No. 3) Regulations 2003 (S.S.I. 2003/333)
- Diseases of Animals (Approved Disinfectants) Amendment (Scotland) Order 2003 (S.S.I. 2003/334)
- Form of Repair Notice (Scotland) Regulations 2003 (S.S.I. 2003/335)
- Form of Improvement Order (Scotland) Regulations 2003 (S.S.I. 2003/336)
- Housing Grants (Form of Cessation or Partial Cessation of Conditions Notice) (Scotland) Regulations 2003 (S.S.I. 2003/337)
- Housing Grants (Form of Notice of Payment) (Scotland) Regulations 2003 (S.S.I. 2003/338)
- Environmental Impact Assessment (Water Management) (Scotland) Regulations 2003 (S.S.I. 2003/341)
- Landfill (Scotland) Amendment Regulations 2003 (S.S.I. 2003/343)
- National Health Service (Compensation for Premature Retirement) (Scotland) Regulations 2003 (S.S.I. 2003/344)
- Act of Sederunt (Summary Applications, Statutory Applications and Appeals etc. Rules) Amendment (Standards Commission for Scotland) 2003 (S.S.I. 2003/346)
- Public Appointments and Public Bodies etc. (Scotland) Act 2003 (Commencement No. 2) Order 2003 (S.S.I. 2003/348)
- Education (School Meals) (Scotland) Regulations 2003 (S.S.I. 2003/350)
- Movement of Animals (Restrictions) (Scotland) Order 2003 (S.S.I. 2003/353)
- Diseases of Poultry (Scotland) Order 2003 (S.S.I. 2003/354)
- Greenburn Light Railway (Scotland) Order 2003 (S.S.I. 2003/359)
- Food Protection (Emergency Prohibitions) (Amnesic Shellfish Poisoning) (West Coast) (No. 3) (Scotland) Order 2003 (S.S.I. 2003/365)
- Food Protection (Emergency Prohibitions) (Amnesic Shellfish Poisoning) (East Coast) (Scotland) Order 2003 (S.S.I. 2003/366)
- Food Protection (Emergency Prohibitions) (Amnesic Shellfish Poisoning) (East Coast) (No. 2) (Scotland) Order 2003 (S.S.I. 2003/369)
- Prohibition of Fishing for Scallops (Scotland) Order 2003 (S.S.I. 2003/371)
- Food Protection (Emergency Prohibitions) (Amnesic Shellfish Poisoning) (West Coast) (No. 4) (Scotland) Order 2003 (S.S.I. 2003/374)
- Food Protection (Emergency Prohibitions) (Radioactivity in Sheep) Partial Revocation (Scotland) Order 2003 (S.S.I. 2003/375)
- National Health Service (Travelling Expenses and Remission of Charges) (Scotland) Regulations 2003 (S.S.I. 2003/376)
- Sexual Offences (Amendment) Act 2000 (Commencement No. 4) (Scotland) Order 2003 (S.S.I. 2003/378)
- Food Protection (Emergency Prohibitions) (Amnesic Shellfish Poisoning) (East Coast) (No. 3) (Scotland) Order 2003 (S.S.I. 2003/380)
- Food Protection (Emergency Prohibitions) (Amnesic Shellfish Poisoning) (West Coast) (No. 5) (Scotland) Order 2003 (S.S.I. 2003/381)
- Food (Hot Chilli and Hot Chilli Products) (Emergency Control) (Scotland) Regulations 2003 (S.S.I. 2003/382)
- Public Appointments and Public Bodies etc. (Scotland) Act 2003 (Commencement No. 3) Order 2003 (S.S.I. 2003/384)
- Act of Sederunt (Rules of the Court of Session Amendment No.5) (Insolvency Proceedings) 2003 (S.S.I. 2003/385)
- Act of Adjournal (Criminal Appeals) 2003 (S.S.I. 2003/387)
- Act of Sederunt (Sheriff Court Company Insolvency Rules 1986) Amendment 2003 (S.S.I. 2003/388)
- Food Protection (Emergency Prohibitions) (Amnesic Shellfish Poisoning) (West Coast) (No. 6) (Scotland) Order 2003 (S.S.I. 2003/392)
- Food Protection (Emergency Prohibitions) (Amnesic Shellfish Poisoning) (East Coast) (No. 4) (Scotland) Order 2003 (S.S.I. 2003/393)
- Food Protection (Emergency Prohibitions) (Amnesic Shellfish Poisoning) (East Coast) (No. 5) (Scotland) Order 2003 (S.S.I. 2003/394)
- Food (Brazil Nuts) (Emergency Control) (Scotland) Regulations 2003 (S.S.I. 2003/396)
- Food Protection (Emergency Prohibitions) (Amnesic Shellfish Poisoning) (West Coast) (No. 7) (Scotland) Order 2003 (S.S.I. 2003/397)

== 401-500 ==
- Nursing and Midwifery Student Allowances (Scotland) Amendment Regulations 2003 (S.S.I. 2003/401)
- Food Protection (Emergency Prohibitions) (Amnesic Shellfish Poisoning) (West Coast) (No. 8) (Scotland) Order 2003 (S.S.I. 2003/402)
- Gaming Act (Variation of Fees) (Scotland) Order 2003 (S.S.I. 2003/403)
- Inshore Fishing (Prohibition of Fishing and Fishing Methods) (Scotland) Amendment Order 2003 (S.S.I. 2003/404)
- Collagen and Gelatine (Intra-Community Trade) (Scotland) Amendment (No. 2) Regulations 2003 (S.S.I. 2003/405)
- Police Pensions (Scotland) Amendment Regulations 2003 (S.S.I. 2003/406)
- Food Protection (Emergency Prohibitions) (Amnesic Shellfish Poisoning) (West Coast) (No. 9) (Scotland) Order 2003 (S.S.I. 2003/409)
- Food Protection (Emergency Prohibitions) (Amnesic Shellfish Poisoning) (West Coast) (No. 10) (Scotland) Order 2003 (S.S.I. 2003/410)
- Animal By-Products (Scotland) Regulations 2003 (S.S.I. 2003/411)
- Food (Figs, Hazelnuts and Pistachios from Turkey) (Emergency Control) (Scotland) Amendment Regulations 2003 (S.S.I. 2003/413)
- Food (Pistachios from Iran) (Emergency Control) (Scotland) Regulations 2003 (S.S.I. 2003/414)
- Road Works (Inspection Fees) (Scotland) Regulations 2003 (S.S.I. 2003/415)
- Road Works (Recovery of Costs) (Scotland) Regulations 2003 (S.S.I. 2003/416)
- Road Works (Reinstatement) (Scotland) Amendment Regulations 2003 (S.S.I. 2003/417)
- Food (Peanuts from Egypt) (Emergency Control) (Scotland) Regulations 2003 (S.S.I. 2003/418)
- Food (Peanuts from China) (Emergency Control) (Scotland) Amendment Regulations 2003 (S.S.I. 2003/419)
- Housing Grants (Application Forms) (Scotland) Regulations 2003 (S.S.I. 2003/420)
- Advice and Assistance (Scotland) Amendment (No. 2) Regulations 2003 (S.S.I. 2003/421)
- National Health Service (General Dental Services) (Scotland) Amendment (No. 2) Regulations 2003 (S.S.I. 2003/422)
- Teachers' Superannuation (Scotland) Amendment Regulations 2003 (S.S.I. 2003/423)
- Children's Hearings (Provision of Information by Principal Reporter) (Prescribed Persons) (Scotland) Order 2003 (S.S.I. 2003/424)
- National Assistance (Assessment of Resources) Amendment (No. 3) (Scotland) Regulations 2003 (S.S.I. 2003/25)
- Classical Swine Fever (Scotland) Order 2003 (S.S.I. 2003/426)
- Land Reform (Scotland) Act (Commencement No. 1) Order 2003 (S.S.I. 2003/427)
- Air Quality Limit Values (Scotland) Regulations 2003 (S.S.I. 2003/428)
- Food Protection (Emergency Prohibitions) (Amnesic Shellfish Poisoning) (Orkney) (No. 3) (Scotland) Order 2003 (S.S.I. 2003/429)
- National Health Service (Optical Charges and Payments) (Scotland) Amendment (No. 3) Regulations 2003 (S.S.I. 2003/431)
- National Health Service (General Ophthalmic Services) (Scotland) Amendment (No. 2) Regulations 2003 (S.S.I. 2003/432)
- Scottish Water Prevention of Water Pollution (Loch Katrine, Loch Arklet, Glen Finglas) Byelaws Extension Order 2003 (S.S.I. 2003/433)
- Housing (Scotland) Act 2001 (Commencement No. 7, Transitional Provisions and Savings) Order 2003 (S.S.I. 2003/434)
- Stornoway Harbour Revision (Constitution) Order 2003 (S.S.I. 2003/435)
- Smoke Control Area (Exempt Fireplaces) (Scotland) Order 2003 (S.S.I. 2003/436)
- Food (Star Anise from Third Countries) (Emergency Control) (Scotland) Revocation Order 2003 (S.S.I. 2003/437)
- Criminal Justice (Scotland) Act 2003 (Transitional Provisions) Order 2003 (S.S.I. 2003/438)
- Criminal Justice (Scotland) Act 2003 (Commencement No. 2) Order 2003 (S.S.I. 2003/439)
- Victims' Rights (Prescribed Bodies) (Scotland) Order 2003 (S.S.I. 2003/440)
- Victim Statements (Prescribed Offences) (Scotland) Order 2003 (S.S.I. 2003/441)
- National Health Service (General Medical Services) (Scotland) Amendment (No. 3) Regulations 2003 (S.S.I. 2003/443)
- Pesticides (Maximum Residue Levels in Crops, Food and Feeding Stuffs) (Scotland) Amendment (No. 2) Regulations 2003 (S.S.I. 2003/445)
- Compulsory Purchase of Land (Scotland) Regulations 2003 (S.S.I. 2003/446)
- Fife National Health Service Trusts (Dissolution) Order 2003 (S.S.I. 2003/448)
- Lands Tribunal for Scotland (Relevant Certificate) (Fees) Rules 2003 (S.S.I. 2003/451)
- Lands Tribunal for Scotland Rules 2003 (S.S.I. 2003/452)
- Title Conditions (Scotland) Act 2003 (Conservation Bodies) Order 2003 (S.S.I. 2003/453)
- Title Conditions (Scotland) Act 2003 (Commencement No. 1) Order 2003 (S.S.I. 2003/454)
- Abolition of Feudal Tenure etc. (Scotland) Act 2000 (Commencement No. 1) Order 2003 (S.S.I. 2003/455)
- Abolition of Feudal Tenure etc. (Scotland) Act 2000 (Commencement No. 2) (Appointed Day) Order 2003 (S.S.I. 2003/456)
- National Health Service (Travelling Expenses and Remission of Charges) (Scotland) (No. 2) Regulations 2003 (S.S.I. 2003/460)
- Housing Grants (Assessment of Contributions) (Scotland) Regulations 2003 (S.S.I. 2003/461)
- Housing Grants (Minimum Percentage Grant) (Scotland) Regulations 2003 (S.S.I. 2003/462)
- Civic Government (Scotland) Act 1982 (Licensing of Houses in Multiple Occupation) Amendment Order 2003 (S.S.I. 2003/463)
- Collagen and Gelatine (Intra Community Trade) (Scotland) Revocation Regulations 2003 (S.S.I. 2003/466)
- Act of Adjournal (Criminal Procedure Rules Amendment No.2) (Miscellaneous) 2003 (S.S.I. 2003/468)
- Feeding Stuffs (Scotland) Amendment (No. 3) Regulations 2003 (S.S.I. 2003/474)
- Criminal Justice (Scotland) Act 2003 (Commencement No. 3 and Revocation) Order 2003 (S.S.I. 2003/475)
- Protection of Animals (Anaesthetics) (Scotland) Amendment Order 2003 (S.S.I. 2003/476)
- Freedom of Information (Scotland) Act 2002 (Commencement No. 2) Order 2003 (S.S.I. 2003/477)
- Civil Legal Aid (Scotland) Amendment (No. 2) Regulations 2003 (S.S.I. 2003/486)
- Further and Higher Education (Scotland) Act 1992 Amendment Order 2003 (S.S.I. 2003/487)
- Welfare of Farmed Animals (Scotland) Amendment Regulations 2003 (S.S.I. 2003/488)
- Scottish Water, Prevention of Water Pollution (Milngavie Waterworks) Byelaws Extension Order 2003 (S.S.I. 2003/489)
- Cromarty Firth Port Authority (Constitution) Revision Order 2003 (S.S.I. 2003/491)
- Condensed Milk and Dried Milk (Scotland) Amendment Regulations 2003 (S.S.I. 2003/492)
- Food (Hot Chilli and Hot Chilli Products) (Emergency Control) (Scotland) Amendment Regulations 2003 (S.S.I. 2003/493)
- Food Protection (Emergency Prohibitions) (Amnesic Shellfish Poisoning) (East Coast) (No. 2) (Scotland) Revocation Order 2003 (S.S.I. 2003/494)
- Food Protection (Emergency Prohibitions) (Amnesic Shellfish Poisoning) (East Coast) (No. 5) (Scotland) Revocation Order 2003 (S.S.I. 2003/495)
- Mental Health (Care and Treatment) (Scotland) Act 2003 (Consequential Modification) Order 2003 (S.S.I. 2003/498)
- Advice and Assistance (Assistance by Way of Representation) (Scotland) Amendment Regulations 2003 (S.S.I. 2003/500)

== 501-600 ==
- Food Protection (Emergency Prohibitions) (Amnesic Shellfish Poisoning) (Orkney) (No. 4) (Scotland) Order 2003 (S.S.I. 2003/501)
- Horticultural Produce (Community Grading Rules) (Scotland) Regulations 2003 (S.S.I. 2003/502)
- Title Conditions (Scotland) Act 2003 (Consequential Provisions) Order 2003 (S.S.I. 2003/503)
- Road Traffic Act 1991 (Special Parking Area) (Scotland) Order 2003 (S.S.I. 2003/508)
- Road Works (Sharing of Costs of Works) (Scotland) Regulations 2003 (S.S.I. 2003/509)
- Scottish Legal Aid Board (Employment of Solicitors to Provide Criminal Legal Assistance) Amendment Regulations 2003 (S.S.I. 2003/511)
- Road Works (Reinstatement) (Scotland) Amendment (No. 2) Regulations 2003 (S.S.I. 2003/512)
- Inshore Fishing (Prohibition of Fishing and Fishing Methods) (Scotland) Amendment (No. 2) Order 2003 (S.S.I. 2003/514)
- Adults with Incapacity (Scotland) Act 2000 (Commencement No. 5) Order 2003 (S.S.I. 2003/516)
- National Health Service Superannuation Scheme (Scotland) Amendment (No. 3) Regulations 2003 (S.S.I. 2003/517)
- Nitrate Vulnerable Zones (Grants) (Scotland) Amendment Scheme 2003 (S.S.I. 2003/518)
- Victim Statements (Prescribed Offences) (Scotland) Amendment Order 2003 (S.S.I. 2003/519)
- Lands Tribunal for Scotland Amendment (Fees) Rules 2003 (S.S.I. 2003/521)
- Disposal of Records (Scotland) Amendment Regulations 2003 (S.S.I. 2003/522)
- Specified Sugar Products (Scotland) Regulations 2003 (S.S.I. 2003/527)
- Mink Keeping (Scotland) Order 2003 (S.S.I. 2003/528)
- Home Energy Efficiency Scheme Amendment (No. 2) (Scotland) Regulations 2003 (S.S.I. 2003/529)
- Public Finance and Accountability (Scotland) Act 2000 (Access to Documents and Information) (Relevant Persons) Order 2003 (S.S.I. 2003/530)
- Control of Pollution (Silage, Slurry and Agricultural Fuel Oil) (Scotland) Regulations 2003 (S.S.I. 2003/531)
- Housing (Scotland) Act 2001 (Transfer of Scottish Homes Property and Liabilities) Order 2003 (S.S.I. 2003/532)
- Environmental Protection (Duty of Care) Amendment (Scotland) Regulations 2003 (S.S.I. 2003/533)
- Scottish Milk Marketing Board (Dissolution) Order 2003 (S.S.I. 2003/534)
- Act of Sederunt (Fees of Messengers-at-Arms) 2003 (S.S.I. 2003/536)
- Act of Sederunt (Rules of the Court of Session Amendment No. 6) (Diligence on the Dependence) 2003 (S.S.I. 2003/537)
- Act of Sederunt (Fees of Sheriff Officers) 2003 (S.S.I. 2003/538)
- Air Quality Limit Values (Scotland) Amendment Regulations 2003 (S.S.I. 2003/547)
- Agricultural Holdings (Scotland) Act 2003 (Commencement No. 3, Transitional and Savings Provisions) Order 2003 (S.S.I. 2003/548)
- Act of Sederunt (Summary Applications, Statutory Applications and Appeals etc. Rules) Amendment (International Protection of Adults) 2003 (S.S.I. 2003/556)
- Food Protection (Emergency Prohibitions) (Amnesic Shellfish Poisoning) (Orkney) (No. 3) (Scotland) Revocation Order 2003 (S.S.I. 2003/557)
- Food (Brazil Nuts) (Emergency Control) (Scotland) Amendment Regulations 2003 (S.S.I. 2003/558)
- Prohibition of Keeping or Release of Live Fish (Specified Species) (Scotland) Order 2003 (S.S.I. 2003/560)
- Food Protection (Emergency Prohibitions) (Amnesic Shellfish Poisoning) (West Coast) (No. 11) (Scotland) Order 2003 (S.S.I. 2003/561)
- Water Environment and Water Services (Scotland) Act 2003 (Commencement No. 1) Order 2003 (S.S.I. 2003/562)
- Victim Statements (Prescribed Courts) (Scotland) Order 2003 (S.S.I. 2003/563)
- Pig Carcase (Grading) Amendment (Scotland) Regulations 2003 (S.S.I. 2003/565)
- Race Relations Act 1976 (Statutory Duties) (Scotland) Amendment Order 2003 (S.S.I. 2003/566)
- Local Government in Scotland Act 2003 (Ancillary Provision) Order 2003 (S.S.I. 2003/567)
- Collagen and Gelatine (Intra-Community Trade) (Scotland) (No. 2) Regulations 2003 (S.S.I. 2003/568)
- Honey (Scotland) Regulations 2003 (S.S.I. 2003/569)
- Regulation of Care (Applications and Provision of Advice) (Scotland) Amendment (No. 2) Order 2003 (S.S.I. 2003/570)
- Regulation of Care (Excepted Services) (Scotland) Amendment Regulations 2003 (S.S.I. 2003/571)
- Regulation of Care (Requirements as to Care Services) (Scotland) Amendment (No. 2) Regulations 2003 (S.S.I. 2003/572)
- Regulation of Care (Fees) (Scotland) Amendment Order 2003 (S.S.I. 2003/573)
- Registration of Establishments Keeping Laying Hens (Scotland) Regulations 2003 (S.S.I. 2003/576)
- National Assistance (Assessment of Resources) Amendment (No. 4) (Scotland) Regulations 2003 (S.S.I. 2003/577)
- Food Labelling Amendment (Scotland) Regulations 2003 (S.S.I. 2003/578)
- Plant Protection Products (Scotland) Regulations 2003 (S.S.I. 2003/579)
- Local Government Pension Reserve Fund (Scotland) Regulations 2003 (S.S.I. 2003/580)
- Pupils' Educational Records (Scotland) Regulations 2003 (S.S.I. 2003/581)
- Agricultural Holdings (Consequential Amendments) (Scotland) Order 2003 (S.S.I. 2003/583)
- African Swine Fever (Scotland) Order 2003 (S.S.I. 2003/586)
- Regulation of Care (Scotland) Act 2001 (Transitional Provisions and Revocation) Order 2003 (S.S.I. 2003/587)
- Transport (Scotland) Act 2001 (Commencement No. 4) Order 2003 (S.S.I. 2003/588)
- Food Protection (Emergency Prohibitions) (Amnesic Shellfish Poisoning) (East Coast) (Scotland) Revocation Order 2003 (S.S.I. 2003/589)
- Food Protection (Emergency Prohibitions) (Amnesic Shellfish Poisoning) (East Coast) (No. 3) (Scotland) Revocation Order 2003 (S.S.I. 2003/590)
- Food Protection (Emergency Prohibitions) (Amnesic Shellfish Poisoning) (Orkney) (No. 4) (Scotland) Revocation Order 2003 (S.S.I. 2003/591)
- Food Protection (Emergency Prohibitions) (Amnesic Shellfish Poisoning) (East Coast) (No. 4) (Scotland) Partial Revocation Order 2003 (S.S.I. 2003/592)
- The End-of-Life Vehicles (Storage and Treatment) (Scotland) Regulations 2003 (S.S.I. 2003/593)
- Proceeds of Crime Act 2002 Amendment (Scotland) Order 2003 (S.S.I. 2003/594)
- Regulation of Care (Scotland) Act 2001 (Commencement No. 4) Order 2003 (S.S.I. 2003/596)
- Lothian University Hospitals National Health Service Trust (Dissolution) Order 2003 (S.S.I. 2003/597)
- Food Protection (Emergency Prohibitions) (Amnesic Shellfish Poisoning) (West Coast) (No. 7) (Scotland) Revocation Order 2003 (S.S.I. 2003/598)
- Miscellaneous Food Additives Amendment (Scotland) (No. 2) Regulations 2003 (S.S.I. 2003/599)
- Pollution Prevention and Control (Designation of Solvent Emissions Directive) (Scotland) Order 2003 (S.S.I. 2003/600

== 601-623 ==
- Act of Sederunt (Taking of Evidence in the European Community) 2003 (S.S.I. 2003/601)
- Public Appointments and Public Bodies etc. (Scotland) Act 2003 (Commencement No. 4) Order 2003 (S.S.I. 2003/602)
- Budget (Scotland) Act 2003 Amendment (No. 2) Order 2003 (S.S.I. 2003/603)
- Food Protection (Emergency Prohibitions) (Amnesic Shellfish Poisoning) (Orkney) (Scotland) Revocation Order 2003 (S.S.I. 2003/605)
- Food Protection (Emergency Prohibitions) (Amnesic Shellfish Poisoning) (West Coast) (No. 5) (Scotland) Partial Revocation Order 2003 (S.S.I. 2003/606)
- Local Government in Scotland Act 2003 (Principal Teachers) Order 2003 (S.S.I. 2003/607)
- Support and Assistance of Young People Leaving Care (Scotland) Regulations 2003 (S.S.I. 2003/608)
- Homelessness etc. (Scotland) Act 2003 (Commencement No. 1) Order 2003 (S.S.I. 2003/609)
- Water Environment and Water Services (Scotland) Act 2003 (Designation of Scotland River Basin District) Order 2003 (S.S.I. 2003/610)
- Producer Responsibility Obligations (Packaging Waste) Amendment (Scotland) Regulations 2003 (S.S.I. 2003/613)
- River Ewe Salmon Fishery District (Baits and Lures) Revocation Regulations 2003 (S.S.I. 2003/614)
- Wester Ross Salmon Fishery District Designation Order 2003 (S.S.I. 2003/615)
- Abolition of Feudal Tenure etc. (Scotland) Act 2000 (Commencement No. 3) Order 2003 (S.S.I. 2003/620)
- Title Conditions (Scotland) Act 2003 (Conservation Bodies) Amendment Order 2003 (S.S.I. 2003/621)
- Sea Fishing (Restriction on Days at Sea) (Scotland) Amendment (No. 3) Order 2003 (S.S.I. 2003/623)
