= Scottish Land Court =

Court of law dealing with land disputes

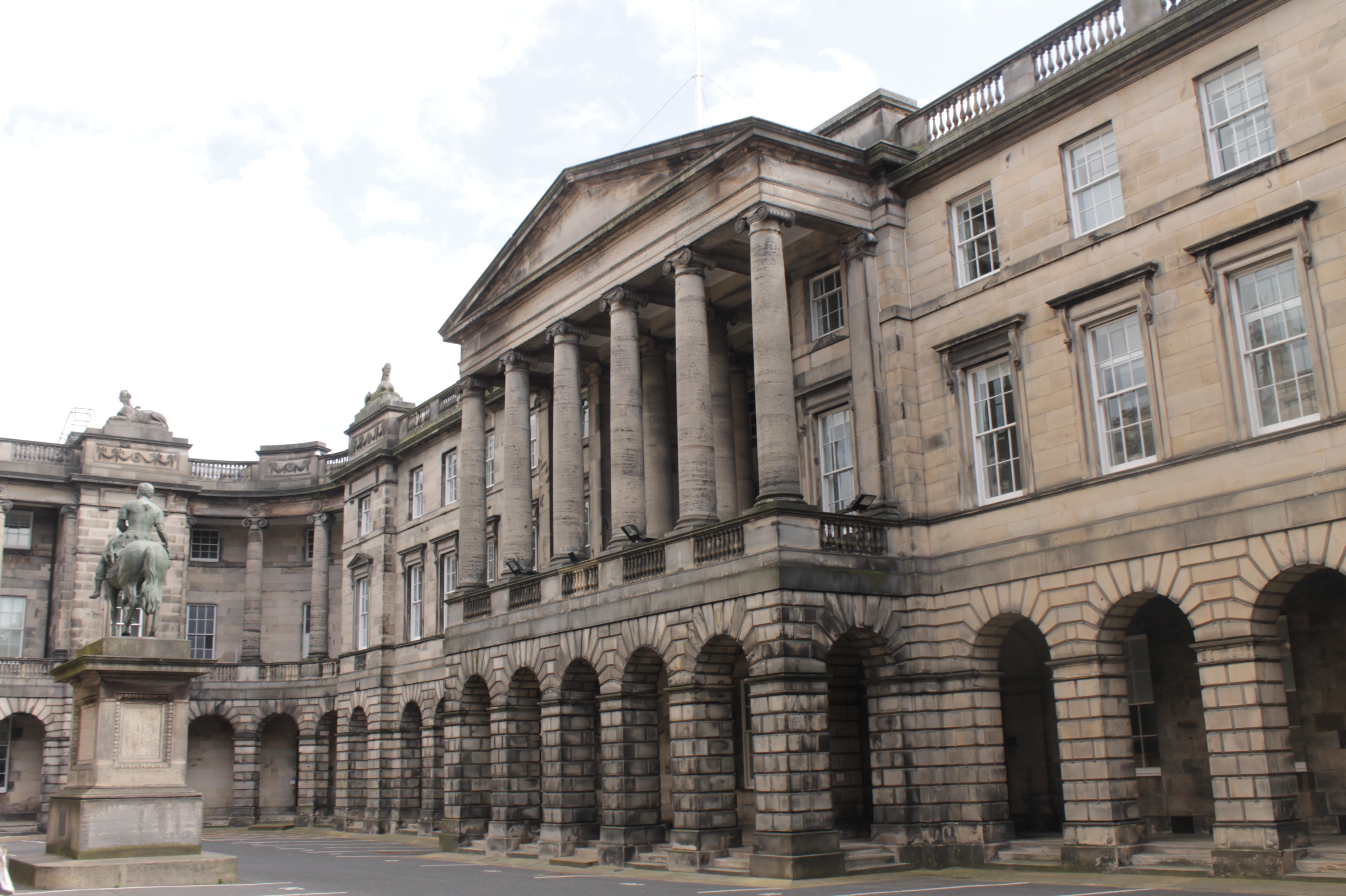
- Scottish version of the Royal Coat of Arms as used by the Courts in Scotland Parliament House, Edinburgh which houses the Scottish Land Court
- Interactive map of Scottish Land Court
- 55.952°N 3.205°W
- Established: 1911; 115 years ago
- Jurisdiction: Scotland
- Location: Parliament House, Edinburgh, Scotland, EH1 1RQ
- Coordinates: 55.952°N 3.205°W
- Composition method: Appointed by the Monarch
- Authorised by: Small Landholders (Scotland) Act 1911, as consolidated by the Scottish Land Court Act 1993.
- Appeals to: Inner House of the Court of Session
- Website: http://www.scottish-land-court.org.uk/

Chairman of the Scottish Land Court
- Currently: Lord Duthie
- Since: 9 January 2023

Deputy Chairman
- Currently: Vacant

The Scottish Land Court (Scottish Gaelic: Cùirt an Fhearainn na h-Alba) is a Scottish court of law based in Edinburgh with subject-matter jurisdiction covering disputes between landlords and tenants relating to agricultural tenancies, and matters related to crofts and crofters. The Scottish Land Court is both a trial court and an appeal court; hearings at first-instance are often heard by a Divisional Court of one of the Agricultural Members advised by the Principal Clerk. Decisions of the Divisional Court can be appealed to the Full Court, which will consist of at least one legally qualified judicial member and the remaining Agricultural Member. Some cases are heard at first-instance by the Full Court, and these cases may be appealed to the Inner House of the Court of Session.

The Chairman of the Scottish Land Court is ranked as a Senator of the College of Justice, and is required to be meet the same eligibility criteria as a Senator. (Note: To be eligible for appointment as a senator a person must have served at least five years as sheriff or sheriff principal, been an advocate for five years, a solicitor with five years rights of audience before the Court of Session or High Court of Justiciary, or been a Writer to the Signet for ten years (having passed the exam in civil law at least two years before application.)) The Scottish Land Court has a legally qualified Deputy Chairman, with several Agricultural Members. The Agricultural Members (also called "practical Members") are lay (not legally qualified) members of the Court with significant experience of agriculture. They deal with many crofting cases, and sit in the Divisional Court, where they are supported by the Principal Clerk as legal assessor. However, the decisions of the Divisional Court rest with the Agricultural Member. The court holds hearings throughout Scotland, and cases can be heard before a divisional court (consisting of one of the Agricultural Members), or the full court (consisting of the Agricultural Members and the legally qualified members.)

The court was established on 1 April 1912 under section 3 of the Small Landholders (Scotland) Act 1911, which was consolidated by the Scottish Land Court Act 1993. The current chairman is Lord Duthie who was appointed on 9 January 2023.

== History ==
The court was established on 1 April 1912 under section 3 of the Small Landholders (Scotland) Act 1911, which was consolidated by the Scottish Land Court Act 1993 (c. 45). In 2012 Lord McGhie lead a special visit to the site of the Battle of the Braes on Skye to commemorate the centenary of the court's founding. The party included Lord Bracadale, who was born on the island. The group passed the church in Camustianaviag where the first witnesses to the court gave evidence in 1912, and acknowledged that the court "stands on the shoulders" of the crofters of the Braes who resisted eviction in 1882.

== Remit and jurisdiction ==
The duty of the court is to settle disputes, relating to agricultural tenancies and to crofts and crofters, by means of a written decision on the case that is reported in the Scottish Land Court Reports and other publications. The court maintains a close relationship with the Lands Tribunal for Scotland, although the duties of both the Land Court and Lands Tribunal are distinct they both share the same administrative office, and the Chairman of the Land Court is also President of the Lands Tribunal.

The court does not adjudicate disputes concerning the ownership of land, or disputes between owners of adjoining land concerning the boundaries thereof, but its scope does include disputes between crofters on such matters. It does not deal with the Crofters (Scotland) Act 1993 regarding succession, the apportionment of common grazings, or decrofting an area of croft land—all of which are within the scope of the Crofting Commission.

When founded, the Scottish Land Court and its judiciary were an administration separate to the Court of Session, the High Court of Justiciary and the sheriff courts. The Judiciary and Courts (Scotland) Act 2008 sought to create a unified judiciary for Scotland, and so the Judiciary and Courts (Scotland) Act 2008 (Scottish Land Court) Order 2017 (SSI 2017/88) transferred responsibility for the administration of the court to the Scottish Courts and Tribunal Service, and made the Chairman and Deputy Chairman part of the unified Scottish judiciary under the Lord President.

=== Divisional Court ===
The main business of the court is handled through local hearings through the Divisional Court, which will hear cases at local venues. The hearings are not required to be held in local sheriff courts; they may be heard in village halls and other similar venues. Hearings at the Divisional Court can involve one of the Agricultural Members of the court, supported by the Principal Clerk as legal adviser, or one of the legally qualified Chairman or Deputy Chairman. The decision is made by the member, whether agricultural or legally qualified. Cases are remitted to the Agricultural Members when the court decides they are suited to make a decision.

A hearing can take two alternative formats: a proof or a debate. A proof is the standard form of civil hearing in Scotland, where the parties get a chance to prove their case. At a proof, evidence is presented and witnesses can be called. In a debate, there is only a hearing of legal arguments, and no witnesses are called. Debates are used where the primary concern is a question of law.

The member responsible for the Divisional Court can inspect the property involved in the dispute, and will usually do so at the end of a hearing. The purpose of the inspection is for the Member (and the Principal Clerk, where the Divisional Court is presided over by an Agricultural Member) to fully understand the evidence and to make a decision with a proper understanding of the nature of the dispute. No new evidence will be heard or taken during an inspection. An inspection may be unaccompanied (neither party present) or accompanied (with both parties present).

Decisions of the Divisional Court may be appealed to the Full Court. The appeal is not an opportunity for a rehearing of the case, but is an opportunity to challenge a wrong decision made by the Divisional Court. This challenge will usually be on a question of law.

In very limited circumstances, and where important information was not put to the court at first hearing, it is possible to seek a rehearing. At a rehearing the court will need to know the reasons for the information not being presented at the original hearing.

=== Full Court ===
Appeals against decision of the Divisional Court are heard by the Full Court: all the members of the court meet in a single hearing. The Full Court will normally be chaired by either the Chairman or the Deputy Chairman, and will include any Member not involved in the initial hearing at Divisional Court. Some disputes are heard at first hearing in the Full Court; such cases may be appealed to the Court of Session.

=== Scottish Land Commission ===
The Scottish Land Commission has been established to review land usage, ownership, and management in Scotland, as well as reviewing the legislation as part of the agenda of land reform. The Tenant Farming Commissioner has a specific jurisdiction related to landlords and tenant farmers. The Tenant Farming Commissioner has powers described by the Land Reform (Scotland) Act 2016.

The Press and Journal newspaper reported on 8 April 2017 that Bob McIntosh, the first Tenant Farming Commissioner, hoped that the Codes of Practice he would develop would help tenants and landowners to resolve disputes without recourse to the Scottish Land Court. He stated that he would be able to investigate instances where a landlord or tenant had not complied with the Codes of Practice, following the lodging of a formal complaint.

== Judges and office holders ==
The court is led by the Chairman, who is legally qualified and ranks as a Senator of the College of Justice, with a Deputy Chairman, who is also legally qualified, and holds office as an advocate. There are two additional Members who are experienced in farming and crofting matters. The running of the court is under the control of the Principal Clerk, who is a qualified lawyer, and will advise the Agricultural Members when they sit as a Divisional Court.

As of 2025 the Land Court was made up of:

Members of the Land Court
| Role | Name | Year appointed |
|---|---|---|
| Chairman | Lord Duthie | 2023 |
| Deputy Chairman | Vacant | 2023 |
| Agricultural Member | John Smith | 2006 |
| Agricultural Member | Tom Campbell | 2016 |
| Gaelic-speaking member, required by Section 1(5) of the Scottish Land Court Act 1993. | Lord Minginish | 2016 (chairman until 2023) |
| Part-time legal member | Deborah Anne Lovell | 2024 |

=== Chairman ===
The Chairman of the Scottish Land Court is also appointed President of the Lands Tribunal for Scotland, and has the same rank, style and title and tenure as a Senator of the College of Justice, but does not number as a member of the Court of Session. The office of Chairman was created with the founding of the Scottish Land Court in 1991 under the Small Landholders (Scotland) Act 1911. The Chairman is legally qualified, and must satisfy the same eligibility criteria as a Senator: that is, they must have served at least five years as sheriff or sheriff principal, and have been either an advocate for five years, or a solicitor with five years rights of audience before the Court of Session or High Court of Justiciary, or been a Writer to the Signet for ten years (having passed the examination in civil law at least two years before application.) The Chairman is supported by a Deputy Chairman, who holds the office of advocate.

As of January 2023, the chairman of the Scottish Land Court is Lord Duthie who was appointed by the monarch on 1 October 2014, having previously served as a sheriff. His nomination by First Minister Nicola Sturgeon was made following a recommendation of the Judicial Appointments Board for Scotland. At the same time he was also appointed by the Scottish Ministers as President of the Lands Tribunal for Scotland.

==== Previous Chairmen ====
Previous chairmen of the Land Court have been:

- 1912–18: Lord Kennedy
- 1918–34: Lord St Vigeans
- 1934–38: Lord Macgregor Mitchell
- 1938–41: Lord Murray
- 1941–65: Lord Gibson
- 1965–78: Lord Birsay
- 1978–92: Lord Elliott
- 1993–96: Lord Philip
- 1996–2014: Lord McGhie
- 2014–2022: Lord Minginish
- 2023–present: Lord Duthie

=== Agricultural Members ===
The Agricultural Members (also called "practical Members") are lay (not legally qualified) members of the Court with significant experience of agriculture. They deal with many crofting cases, and sit in the Divisional Court, where they are supported by the Principal Clerk as legal assessor. However, the decisions of the Divisional Court rest with the Agricultural Member.

They hear cases throughout Scotland, and are expected to work on average three days a week. By statute they must retire at the age of 70.

Agricultural Members will need to travel to the place where the dispute has arisen in order to conduct an Inspection. Sometimes they have to spend considerable time away from home. For instance, in 1913 the Divisional Court sat in Shetland for 3 months.

=== Principal Clerk ===
The Principal Clerk is a legally qualified solicitor who is responsible for the running of the Court and for advising the Agricultural Members when they sit as the Divisional Court. The Principal Clerk is also responsible for the administrative staff of the Court, who are based at the Court's headquarters in Edinburgh.

As of April 2017, the Principal Clerk was Barbara Brown, who was a qualified solicitor and a member of the Law Society of Scotland.

== Decisions ==
Decisions of the Scottish Land Court have varied in format since its inception. Between 1913 and 1963, they were published as a supplement to the Scottish Law Review and Reports of Sheriff Court Cases. Since 1982, the Land Court has produced its own volumes of reported decisions each year. From 1964, decisions of the court have also been reported in the Scots Law Times, in a section dealing with Land Court cases. Additionally, under the terms of section 18 of the Crofters Holdings (Scotland) Act 1886 (49 & 50 Vict. c. 29), the court was obliged to make an annual report to the Secretary of State for Scotland on its proceedings, which would then be presented to Parliament.

The court also maintains an online digest (Note: Viewable at http://www.scottish-land-court.org.uk/digest.html.) of all cases, which are organised under the following categories:

- Agricultural holdings – Rent
- Agricultural holdings – Notices to quit
- Agricultural holdings – Certificates of bad husbandry
- Agricultural holdings – Agricultural subsidies appeals
- Agricultural holdings – Others
- Crofts – Status
- Crofts – Purchase
- Crofts – Rents
- Crofts – Resumption
- Crofts – Decrofting Directions – Appeals
- Crofts – Others
- Cottars
- Procedure and Expenses

== See also ==
- Agriculture in Scotland
- Scottish Land Commission
