= Lands Tribunal =

Lands Tribunal may refer to:

== United Kingdom ==
- Lands Tribunal (England, Wales and Northern Ireland)
- Lands Tribunal for Scotland
- Lands Tribunal for Northern Ireland

== Hong Kong ==
- Lands Tribunal (Hong Kong)
