= Scottish Land Court Act 1993 =

Act of the Parliament of the United Kingdom

Scottish Land Court Act 1993 (Note: Section 2(1).)
- Act of Parliament
- Parliament of the United Kingdom
- Long title: An Act to consolidate certain enactments relating to the constitution and proceedings of the Scottish Land Court; and to repeal provisions of the Crofters Holdings (Scotland) Act 1886 relating to the Scottish Land Court which are no longer of practical utility.
- Citation: 1993 c. 45
- Territorial extent: Scotland (Note: Section 2(4).)

Dates
- Royal assent: 5 November 1993
- Commencement: 5 January 1994 (Note: Section 2(3).)

Other legislation
- Amends: See § Repealed enactments
- Repeals/revokes: See § Repealed enactments
- Amended by: Scotland Act 1998; Agricultural Holdings (Scotland) Act 2003; Land Reform (Scotland) Act 2003; Nature Conservation (Scotland) Act 2004; Crofting Reform etc. Act 2007; Judicial Pensions and Retirement Act 1993 (Scottish Land Court) Order 2013; Courts Reform (Scotland) Act 2014; Environmental Regulation (Enforcement Measures) (Scotland) Order 2015; Courts Reform (Scotland) Act 2014 (Relevant Officer and Consequential Provisions) Order 2016; Land Reform (Scotland) Act 2016; Judiciary and Courts (Scotland) Act 2008 (Scottish Land Court) Order 2017; Public Service Pensions and Judicial Offices Act 2022; Land Reform (Scotland) Act 2025
- Relates to: Crofters (Scotland) Act 1993

Status: Amended

Text of statute as originally enacted

Revised text of statute as amended

Text of the Scottish Land Court Act 1993 as in force today (including any amendments) within the United Kingdom, from legislation.gov.uk.

The Scottish Land Court Act 1993 (c. 45) is an act of the Parliament of the United Kingdom that consolidated enactments relating to the constitution and proceedings of the Scottish Land Court in Scotland.

== Provisions ==
=== Repealed enactments ===
Section 2(2) of the act repealed 8 enactments, listed in schedule 2 to the act.

Citation	Short title	Extent of repeal
49 & 50 Vict. c. 29	Crofters Holdings (Scotland) Act 1886	In section 21, the last two paragraphs.
49 & 50 Vict. c. 29	Crofters Holdings (Scotland) Act 1886	Sections 24 to 26.
49 & 50 Vict. c. 29	Crofters Holdings (Scotland) Act 1886	Section 29.
1 & 2 Geo. 5. c. 49	Small Landholders (Scotland) Act 1911	Section 3.
1 & 2 Geo. 5. c. 49	Small Landholders (Scotland) Act 1911	Section 25.
1 & 2 Geo. 6. c. 31	Scottish Land Court Act 1938	The whole act.
3 & 4 Eliz. 2. c. 21	Crofters (Scotland) Act 1955	Section 34.
9 & 10 Eliz. 2. c. 58	Crofters (Scotland) Act 1961	Section 4(3).
1976 c. 21	Crofting Reform (Scotland) Act 1976	Section 17(1).
1990 c. 40	Law Reform (Miscellaneous Provisions) (Scotland) Act 1990	Section 35(4).
1990 c. 40	Law Reform (Miscellaneous Provisions) (Scotland) Act 1990	In Schedule 4, paragraph 12.
1991 c. 55	Agricultural Holdings (Scotland) Act 1991	Section 83.

== Subsequent developments ==
The act has been amended on multiple occasions. The Scotland Act 1998 amended section 1(2) and inserted section 1(2A), transferring ministerial functions to the Scottish Ministers with effect from 1 July 1999. Further amendments were made by the Agricultural Holdings (Scotland) Act 2003, the Land Reform (Scotland) Act 2003, and the Nature Conservation (Scotland) Act 2004, each extending the court's jurisdiction. The Crofting Reform etc. Act 2007 made substantial amendments to Schedule 1, inserting new paragraphs and modifying the court's organisational provisions. The Courts Reform (Scotland) Act 2014 substituted paragraph 3 of Schedule 1, making provision for the Scottish Courts and Tribunals Service to assume responsibility for the court's administration. The Land Reform (Scotland) Act 2016, the Public Service Pensions and Judicial Offices Act 2022, and the Land Reform (Scotland) Act 2025 have made further amendments.

The act is due to be repealed by paragraph 5 of schedule 2 to the Crofting and Scottish Land Court Act 2026, which provides for the merger of the Scottish Land Court with the Lands Tribunal for Scotland.
