= Camastianavaig =

Coordinates: 57.378°N 6.149°W

Camastianavaig: Scottish Gaelic: Camas Dìonabhaig
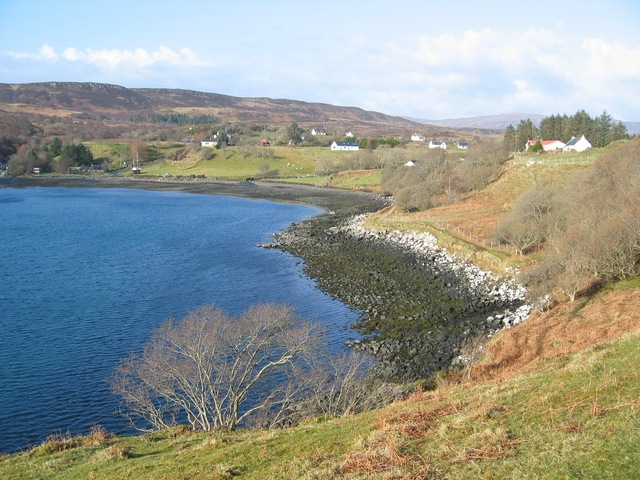
- The shoreward side of Camastianavaig

- Location within the Isle of Skye
- OS grid reference: NG412656
- Council area: Highland
- Lieutenancy area: Ross and Cromarty
- Country: Scotland
- Sovereign state: United Kingdom
- Post town: Portree
- Postcode district: IV51 9
- Police: Scotland
- Fire: Scottish
- Ambulance: Scottish
- UK Parliament: Inverness, Skye and West Ross-shire
- Scottish Parliament: Highlands and Islands

Camastianavaig (also English spelling: Camustinivaig) is a crofting township on the island of Skye in Scotland. It is located on the shores of the Sound of Raasay, 5 kilometres (3 miles) southeast of Portree. The Lòn Bàn watercourse flows from Loch Fada to "An Eas Mhòr" below which it is named "Allt Ósglan" and discharges into the sea at Camas Tianabhaig. The stream forms the boundary between the township and Conordan to the south. Ósglan itself is the land on the right bank of Allt Ósglan.

The name is from both Gaelic and Norse, Camas Dìonabhaig. "Camas" means "bay" in the former and the Norse element may be from "dyn" meaning "noisy".

== Tourist activities ==
Camastianavaig has a rocky shore with views of the Cuillin and Raasay and is situated at the bottom of Ben Tianavaig, where there is a sea eagle colony. Other local wildlife includes bottlenose dolphin in the summer months, and seals, otters and ducks on a regular basis.

== Agriculture ==
The land is used for mainly crofting, with the majority of the livestock being sheep and a few cows. The land is slightly too acidic for arable farming although the addition of lime is used to compensate for this. The soil is also low in potassium, phosphorus and nitrogen, which are essential elements required for plant growth. The high levels of rainfall and steep slopes also cause soil erosion, creating further difficulties for crop growing.

== Battle of the Braes ==
The township is near the scene of the Battle of the Braes (Scottish Gaelic: Blàr a' Chumhaing) in 1882. Local crofting tenants facing eviction from the land withheld rent and released sheep onto a forbidden area on the shores of Ben Lee. Sent to evict them, the Sheriff Officer from Portree was met by an angry mob, who forced him to burn the eviction notices. Subsequently 50 Glasgow policemen, sent to quell the rebellion, faced 100 men, women and children, armed with sticks and stones. Several people were injured and five men were arrested. Small fines were imposed in court, but it was clear that law and order could only be enforced with military assistance. After the Battle of the Braes, the unrest spread to Glendale, Skye. The rebellion led to the Napier Commission and ultimately the Crofters' Holdings (Scotland) Act 1886, which brought security of tenure and the right to hand a croft on to their heirs.

The Battle of the Braes is celebrated by a monument and a folk song and in 2012 various legal dignitaries paid a special visit to the site to commemorate the centenary of the Scottish Land Court. The court's chair, Lord McGhie led a party, including Lord Bracadale and Sheriff Roddy John MacLeod who were both born on Skye, past the church where the first witnesses to the court gave evidence in 1912. The party was expected to acknowledge that the court "stands on the shoulders" of the crofters of the Braes who resisted eviction.
