= Roderick John MacLeod, Lord Minginish =

Scottish advocate (born c.1953)

The Honourable Lord Minginish KC

Chairman of the Scottish Land Court
- In office 17 October 2014 – December 2022
- Nominated by: Alex Salmond; As First Minister
- Appointed by: Elizabeth II
- Preceded by: Lord McGhie
- Succeeded by: Lord Duthie

President of the Lands Tribunal for Scotland
- In office 17 October 2014 – December 2022
- Nominated by: Alex Salmond; As First Minister
- Appointed by: Elizabeth II
- Preceded by: Lord McGhie
- Succeeded by: Lord Duthie

Deputy Chair of the Scottish Land Court
- In office 2006–2014
- Succeeded by: Iain F Maclean

Sheriff
- In office 2000–2014
- Monarch: Elizabeth II

Personal details
- Born: Roderick John MacLeod c. 1953 Skye, Scotland
- Spouse: Lorna
- Education: Portree High School; University of Edinburgh
- Profession: Advocate
- Nickname: Roddy John MacLeod

Roderick John MacLeod, Lord Minginish (Gaelic: Ruairidh Iain MacLeòid; born c. 1953), also known as Roddy John, is a Scottish advocate. From 2014 until his retirement in December 2022, he was Chairman of the Scottish Land Court and President of the Lands Tribunal for Scotland. He was the first Gaelic-speaking chair of the court.

== Early life ==
MacLeod was born on the Isle of Skye in about 1953. (Note: The announcement of MacLeod's installation in October 2014 stated his age then as 61.) His parents, who were both from the outer-Hebridean isle of Harris, moved in the 1920s to a 24 acre croft at Portnalong in Skye in the 1920s as part of a land settlement scheme.

He was educated on Skye at Portnalong Junior Secondary School from 1957 to 1965, and at Portree High School from 1965 to 1971. He then studied law at the University of Edinburgh, graduating with LLB honours in 1975.

== Career ==
MacLeod then undertook a two-year legal apprenticeship in Edinburgh, before working for from 1977–78 in Gaelic-language broadcasting at BBC Scotland, where he presented current affairs programmes on television. He then completed his training in Motherwell, qualifying as a solicitor in 1980. He practised as a solicitor in Edinburgh until 1993, and in July 1994 he was admitted to the Faculty of Advocates.

In 2000, MacLeod was appointed as a Sheriff to Edinburgh Sheriff Court. In 2013 he was appointed Queen's Counsel.

=== Land Court ===
Sheriff MacLeod became Deputy Chair of the Scottish Land Court in 2006, serving under Lord McGhie. In 2013, he accompanied Lord McGhie and High Court Judge Lord Bracadale to Skye to commemorate the 130th anniversary of the 1882 Battle of the Braes. The visit was to acknowledge that the court "stands on the shoulders" of the people of Braes who had resisted the attempted eviction of 12 crofters. Their rebellion spread, and led to the Napier Commission and then the Crofters Act 1886, which gave crofters security of tenure.

In September 2014, he was appointed by Elizabeth II to succeed McGhie as Chairman of the Land Court, taking the title Lord Minginish, after the parish of Minginish in Skye, where he was raised. He was nominated by First Minister Alex Salmond on the recommendation by the independent Judicial Appointments Board for Scotland. Since 1978, the Chair of the Land Court has also held the office of President of the separate Lands Tribunal for Scotland, and Lord Minginish accordingly held both roles.

Lord Minginish took office on 1 October 2014. On 17 October, he was installed in office at the Land Court's headquarters in George House, Edinburgh. The ceremony was led by Lord Gill, who was then the Lord President of the Court of Session and head of the Scottish judiciary.

He retired in December 2022.

== Other interests ==
Lord Minginish has since 2006 been director of Sabhal Mòr Ostaig, the National Centre for Gaelic Language and Culture, based on the Skye. He has been chair of the higher education college's board of directors since 2007. In 2010, he was a keynote speaker at An t-Alltan, an annual conference organised by Stòrlann Nàiseanta na Gàidhlig for teachers working in Gaelic medium education. He is also a member of the council of the Royal Celtic Society.

== Personal life ==
Lord Minginish married in 1980. He lives in Edinburgh.

== Notes ==
Legal offices
Preceded by Lord McGhie	Chairman of the Scottish Land Court; 2014–2022	Succeeded by Lord Duthie
Preceded by Lord McGhie	President of the Lands Tribunal for Scotland; 2014–2022	Succeeded by Lord Duthie
