= Agriculture in Scotland =

Farming sector of the economy of Scotland

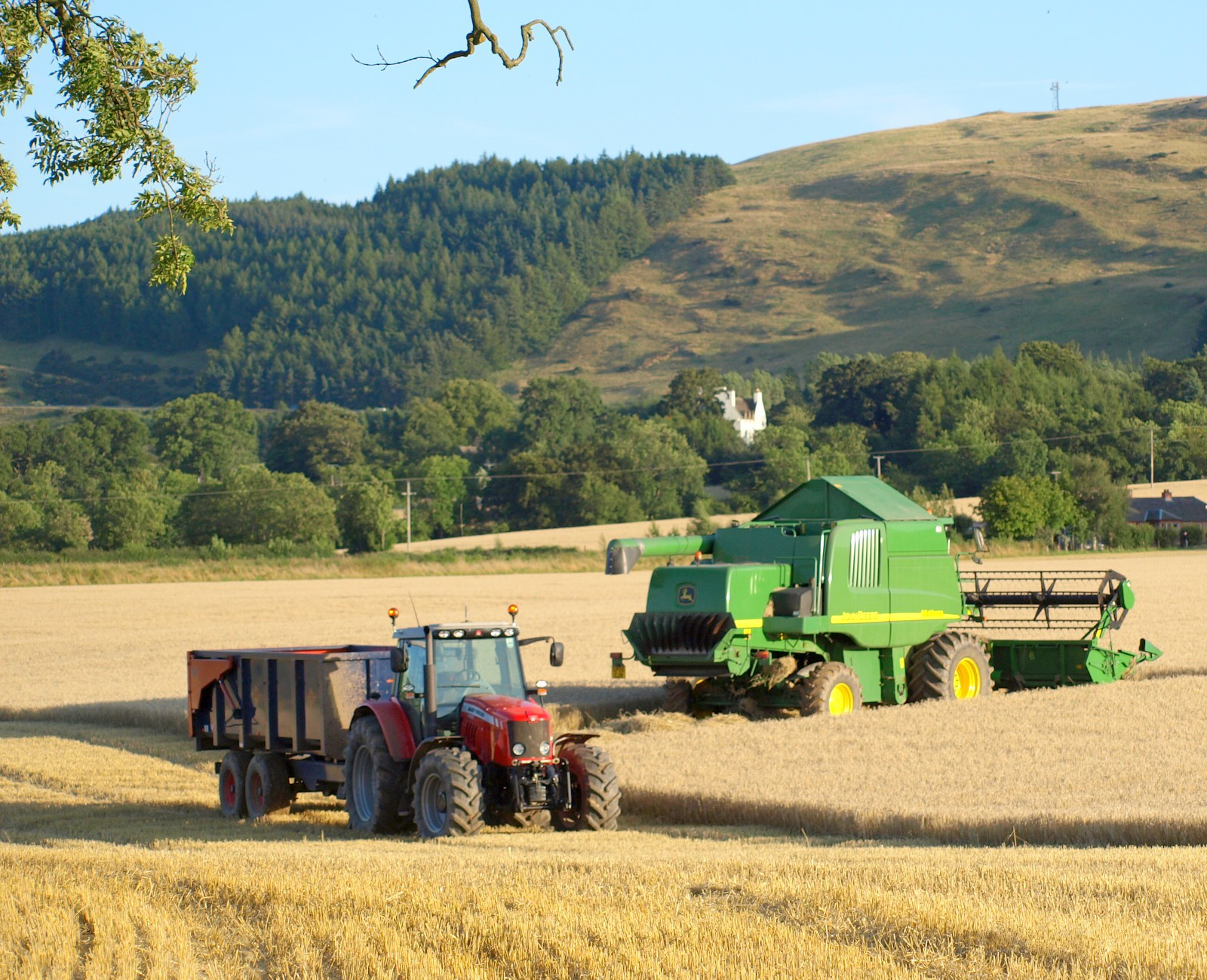
Grain harvest, Bridge of Earn, Perthshire, Scotland

Agriculture in Scotland includes all land use for arable, horticultural or pastoral activity in Scotland, or around its coasts. The first permanent settlements and farming date from the Neolithic period, from around 6,000 years ago. From the beginning of the Bronze Age, about 2000 BCE, arable land spread at the expense of forest. From the Iron Age, beginning in the seventh century BCE, there was use of cultivation ridges and terraces. During the period of Roman occupation there was a reduction in agriculture and the early Middle Ages were a period of climate deterioration resulting in more unproductive land. Most farms had to produce a self-sufficient diet, supplemented by hunter-gathering. More oats and barley were grown, and cattle were the most important domesticated animal. From c. 1150 to 1300, the Medieval Warm Period allowed cultivation at greater heights and made land more productive. The system of infield and outfield agriculture may have been introduced with feudalism from the twelfth century. The rural economy boomed in the thirteenth century, but by the 1360s there was a severe falling off in incomes to be followed by a slow recovery in the fifteenth century.

The early modern era saw the impact of the Little Ice Age, which peaked towards the end of the seventeenth century. The closing decade of the seventeenth century saw a slump, followed by four years of failed harvests, in what is known as the "seven ill years", but these shortages would be the last of their kind. After the Union of 1707 there was a conscious attempt to improve agriculture among the gentry and nobility. Introductions included haymaking, the English plough, new crops, crop rotation and encloses were introduced. The resulting Lowland Clearances saw hundreds of thousands of cottars and tenant farmers from central and southern Scotland lose access to land and either become landless agricultural workers or emigrate to the growing industrial cities or elsewhere. The later Highland Clearances involved the eviction of many traditional tenants as lands were enclosed, principally for sheep farming. In the first phase, many Highlanders were relocated as crofters, living on very small rented farms which required other employment to be found.

In the twentieth century Scottish agriculture became more susceptible to world markets. There were dramatic price rises in the First World War, but a slump in the 1920s and 1930s, followed by more rises in World War II. In 1947 annual price reviews were introduced in an attempt to stabilise the market. There was a drive in UK agriculture to greater production until the late 1970s, resulting in intensive farming. There was increasing mechanisation and farming became less labour-intensive. UK membership of the European Economic Community from 1972 began a change in orientation for Scottish farming. Some sectors became viable only with subsidies. A series of reforms to the CAP from the 1990s attempted to control over-production, limit incentives for intensive farming and mitigate environmental damage. A dual farm structure has emerged with agriculture divided between large commercial farms and small pluralised and diversified holdings.

Roughly 79 per cent of Scotland’s total land area is under agricultural production. Cereals accounted for 78 per cent of cropped land area (not total farmed area), while livestock numbers have been falling in recent years. Around 15 per cent of the total land area of Scotland is forested, most in public ownership controlled by the Forestry Commission. Total income from farming has been rising since the turn of the millennium. Aquaculture production is focused on the West and North of the country. Some farm businesses rely on sources of income other than from farming. Scottish agriculture employs around 1.5 per cent of the workforce and contributes to around 1 per cent of the Scottish economy.

== Topography and climate ==
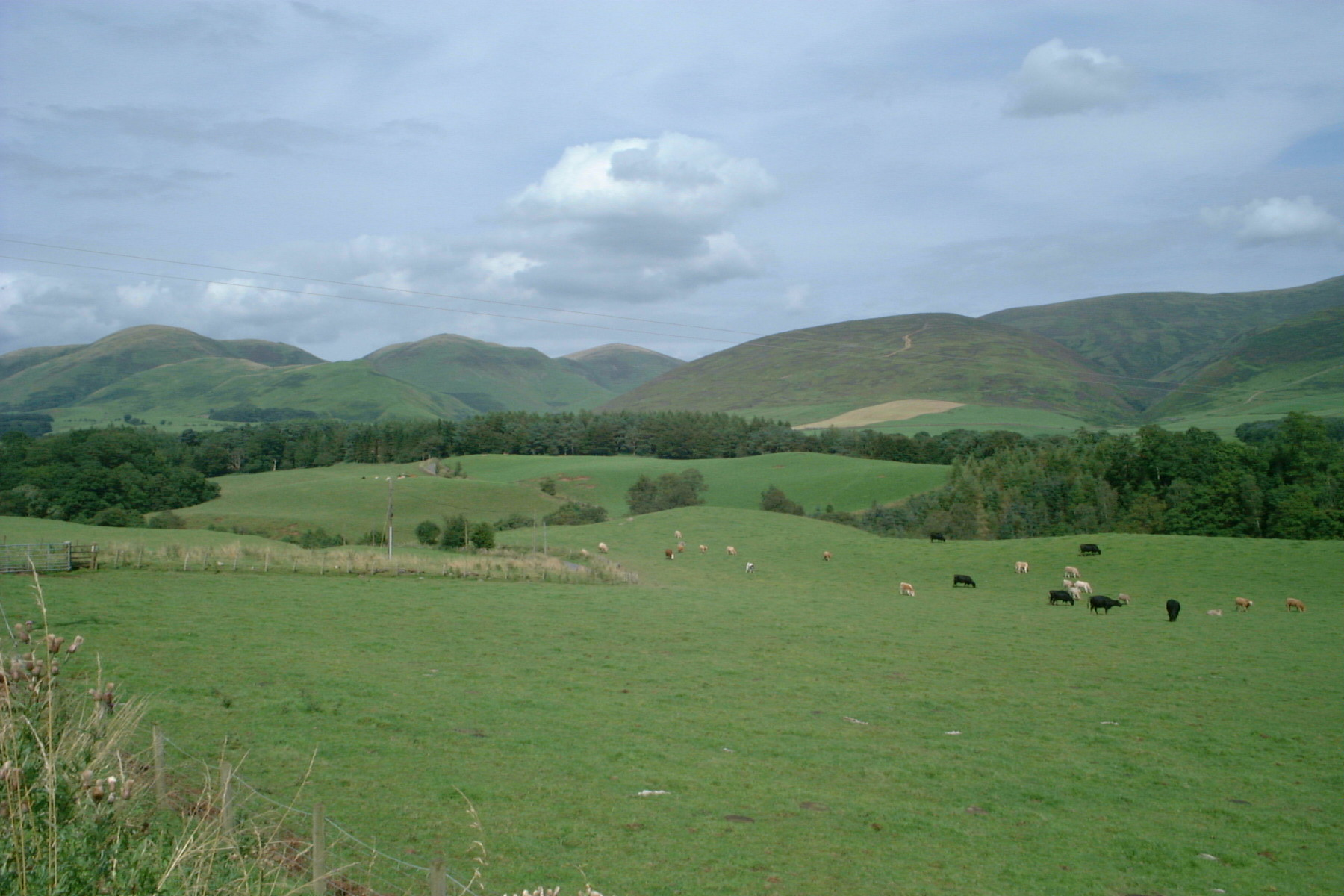
The Southern Uplands around Durisdeer

The defining factor in the geography of Scotland is the distinction between the Highlands and Islands in the north and west and the Lowlands in the south and east. The Highlands are further divided into the Northwest Highlands and the Grampian Mountains by the fault line of the Great Glen. The Lowlands are divided into the fertile belt of the Central Lowlands and the higher terrain of the Southern Uplands, which included the Cheviot Hills, over which the border with England runs. The Central Lowland belt averages about 50 miles in width, and contains most of the good quality agricultural land. Scotland is half the size of England and Wales in area, but with its many inlets, islands and inland lochs, it has roughly the same amount of coastline at 4,000 miles. Only a fifth of Scotland is less than 60 metres above sea level.

Scotland's soils are diverse for a relatively small country due to the variation in geology, topography, climate, altitude and land use history. There are very productive arable soils in the east of the country, including some of the most productive for wheat and barley of anywhere in the world. Scotland's soils differ from much of the rest of the UK and Europe and they provide valuable habitats for wildlife and flora. They are largely naturally acidic in nature with high concentrations of organic carbon. They are predominantly coarse textured and often exhibit poor drainage.

The climate of Scotland is temperate and very changeable, but rarely extreme. Scotland is warmed by the North Atlantic Drift and given the northerly location of the country, experiences much milder conditions than areas on similar latitudes. Average temperatures are lower than in the rest of Great Britain. Western coastal areas of Scotland are warmer than the east and inland areas, due to the influence of the Atlantic currents, and the colder surface temperatures of the North Sea. Rainfall totals vary widely across Scotland—the western highlands of Scotland are one of the wettest places in the UK with annual rainfall up to 4,577 mm (180.2 in). In comparison, much of eastern Scotland receives less than 870 mm (34.3 in) annually; lying in the rain shadow of the western uplands. Annual average sunshine totals vary from as little as 711–1140 hours in the Highlands and the north-west up to 1471–1540 hours on the extreme eastern and south-western coasts. Wind prevails from the south-west, bringing warm, wet and unstable air from the Atlantic. The windiest areas of Scotland are in the north and west, with parts of the Outer Hebrides, Orkney and Shetland experiencing over 30 days with gales per year. Vigorous Atlantic depressions, also known as European windstorms, are a common feature of the autumn and winter in Scotland.

== History ==
=== Prehistory ===
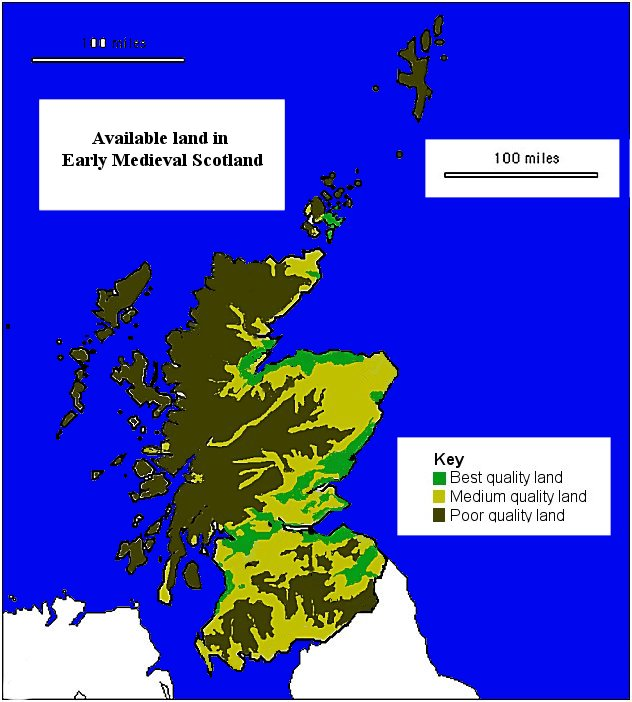
Map of available land in Medieval Scotland

Mesolithic hunter-gatherer encampments formed the first known settlements in Scotland around 8500 BCE. These were highly mobile boat-using people making tools from bone, stone and antlers. In the Neolithic period, around 6,000 years ago, there is evidence of permanent settlements and farming. Archaeological evidence indicates that the two main sources of food were grain and cow's milk. From the beginning of the Bronze Age, about 2000 BCE, arable land spread at the expense of forest. From the Iron Age, beginning in the seventh century BCE, there is evidence of hill forts in southern Scotland that are associated with cultivation ridges and terraces. Souterrains, small underground constructions, may have been for storing perishable agricultural products. Aerial photography reveals extensive prehistoric field systems that underlie existing boundaries in some Lowland areas, suggesting that the fertile plains were already densely exploited for agriculture. During the period of Roman occupation there was re-growth of birch, oak and hazel for five centuries, suggesting a decline of population and agriculture.

=== Middle Ages ===
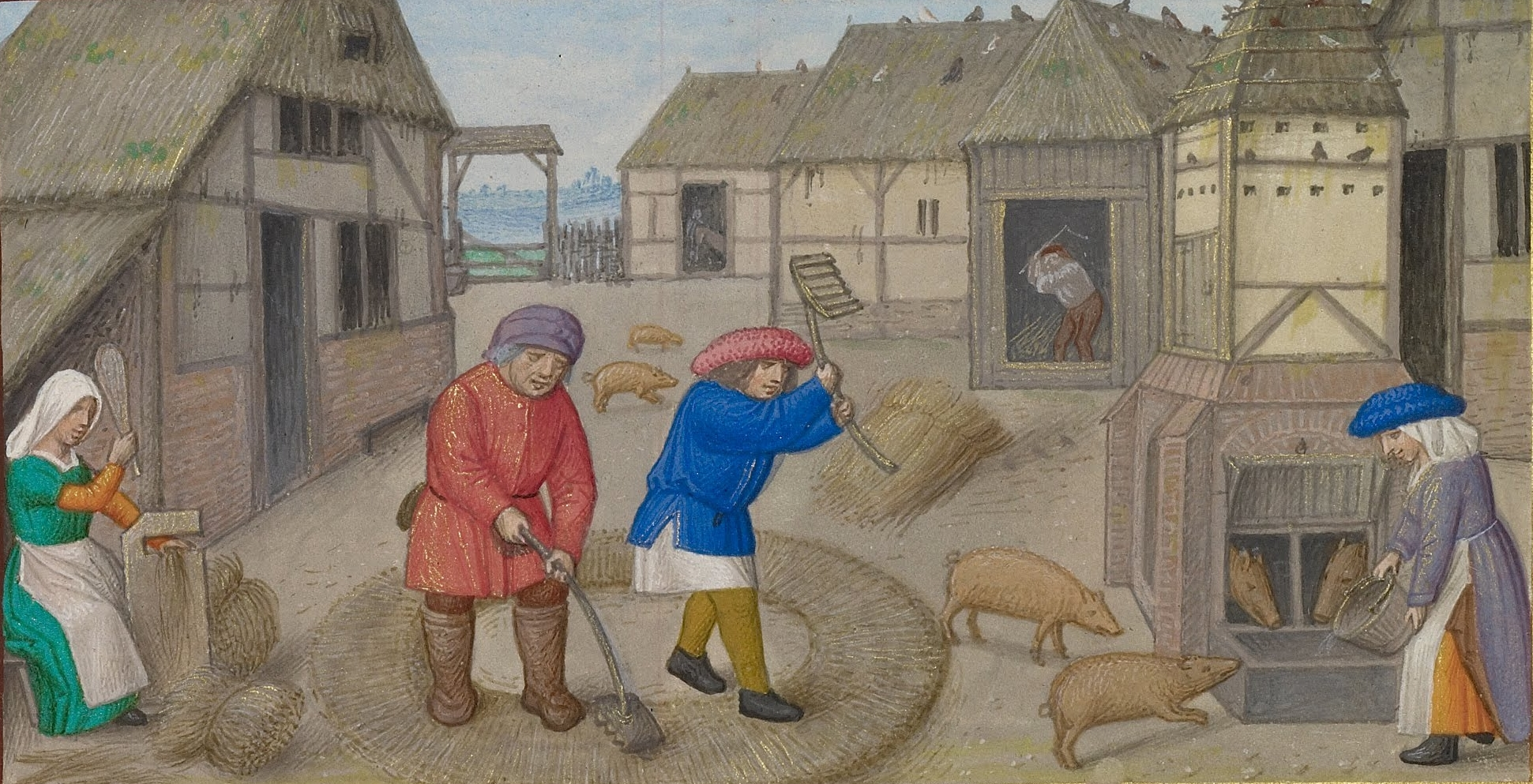
Threshing and pig feeding from a book of hours from the Workshop of the Master of James IV of Scotland (Flemish, c. 1541)

The early Middle Ages were a period of climate deterioration resulting in more land becoming unproductive. Most farms had to produce a self-sufficient diet of meat, dairy products and cereals, supplemented by hunter-gathering. Farming was based around a single homestead or a small cluster of three or four homes, each probably containing a nuclear family. The climate meant that more oats and barley were grown than corn (here meaning wheat) and cattle were the most important domesticated animal. In the period c. 1150 to 1300, warm dry summers and less severe winters allowed cultivation at much greater heights above sea level and made land more productive. Arable farming grew significantly, but was still more common in low-lying areas than in high-lying areas such as the Highlands, Galloway and the Southern Uplands. The system of infield and outfield agriculture, a variation of open field farming widely used across Europe, may have been introduced with feudalism from the twelfth century and would continue until the eighteenth century. Crops were bere (a form of barley), oats and sometimes wheat, rye and legumes. The more extensive outfield was used for oats. By the late Medieval period, most farming was based on the Lowland fermtoun or Highland baile, settlements of a handful of families that jointly farmed an area notionally suitable for two or three plough teams, allocated in run rigs to tenant farmers, known as husbandmen. Runrigs usually ran downhill so that they included both wet and dry land. Most ploughing was done with a heavy wooden plough with an iron coulter, pulled by oxen, which were more effective and cheaper to feed than horses. Key crops included kale, hemp and flax. Sheep and goats were probably the main sources of milk, while cattle were raised for meat. The rural economy appears to have boomed in the thirteenth century and in the immediate aftermath of the Black Death was still buoyant, but by the 1360s there was a severe falling off in incomes to be followed by a slow recovery in the fifteenth century.

=== Early modern era ===
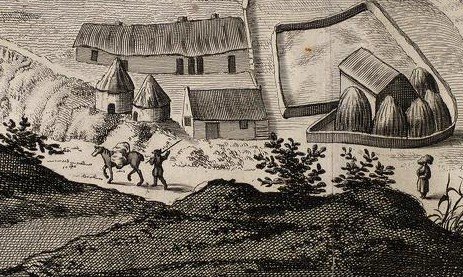
A Scottish Lowland farm from John Slezer's Prospect of Dunfermline, published in the Theatrum Scotiae, 1693

As feudal distinctions declined in the early modern era, the barons and tenants-in-chief merged to form a new identifiable group, the lairds. With the substantial landholders of the yeomen, these heritors were the major landholding orders. Those with property rights included husbandmen, lesser landholders and free tenants. Many young people, both male and female, left home to become domestic and agricultural servants. The early modern era also saw the impact of the Little Ice Age, of colder and wetter weather, which peaked towards the end of the seventeenth century. Almost half the years in the second half of the sixteenth century saw local or national scarcity, necessitating the shipping of large quantities of grain from the Baltic. In the early seventeenth century famine was relatively common, with four periods of famine prices between 1620 and 1625. The English invasions of the 1640s had a profound impact on the Scottish economy. Under the Commonwealth, the country was relatively highly taxed, but gained access to English markets. After the Restoration the formal frontier with England was re-established, along with its customs duties. Economic conditions were generally favourable from 1660 to 1688, as land owners promoted better tillage and cattle-raising. The closing decade of the seventeenth century there was a slump in trade with the Baltic and France and changes in the Scottish cattle trade, followed by four years of failed harvests (1695, 1696 and 1698-9), known as the "seven ill years". The shortages of the 1690s would be the last of their kind.

=== Agricultural revolution ===
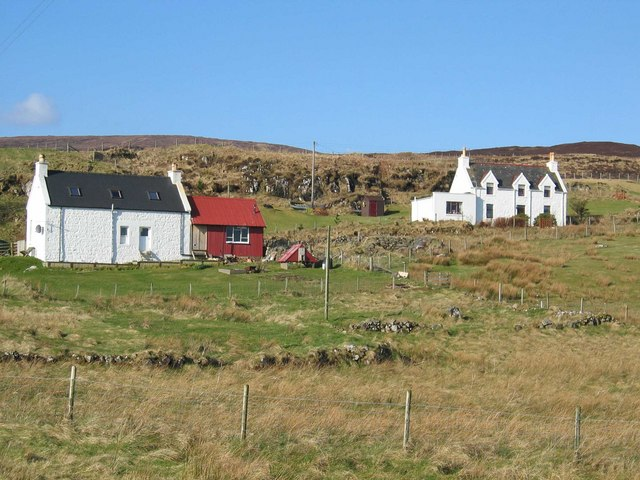
Crofts at Borreraig on the island of Skye

Increasing contacts with England after the Union of 1707 led to a conscious attempt to improve agriculture among the gentry and nobility. The English plough was introduced and foreign grasses, the sowing of rye grass and clover. Turnips and cabbages were introduced, lands enclosed and marshes drained, lime was put down to combat soil acidity, roads built and woods planted. Drilling and sowing and crop rotation were introduced. The introduction of the potato to Scotland in 1739 provided a crop with a high yield, producing 3 to 5 times more calories per acre than a cereal crop. Enclosures began to displace the run rig system. The first result of these changes were the Lowland Clearances.

The botanist John Hope complained about British naturalists who were enthusiastically exploring the landscape of colonial America while "absolutely inattentive to the natural productions of our native country". He founded the Society for the Importation of Foreign Seeds and Plants pursuing, as Carl Linnaeus did in Lapland, the adaptation of valuable cash crop plants to the Highlands.

Agricultural improvement spread north and west, mostly over the period 1760 to 1850 as the Highland Clearances. Many farming tenants were evicted and offered tenancies in crofting communities, with their former possessions converted into large-scale sheep farms. Crofts were intended to be too small to support the occupants, so forcing them to work in other industries, such as fishing, quarrying or kelping. In the 1840 and 1850s Scotland suffered its last major subsistence crisis, when the potato blight that caused the Great Famine of Ireland reached the Highlands in 1846. This gave rise to the second phase of the Highland clearances, when landlords provided assisted passages for their tenants to emigrate in a desperate effort to rid themselves of a redundant population that was dependent on famine relief.

=== Twentieth century ===
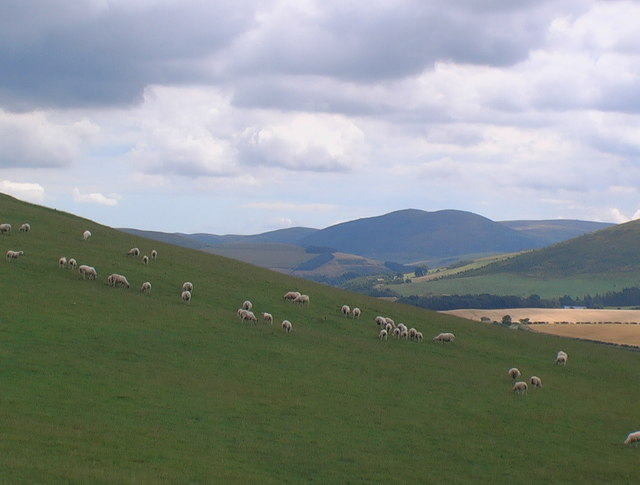
Sheep grazing on slopes of Camp Hill, Bowmont Valley

In the twentieth century Scottish agriculture became susceptible to the ups and downs of world markets. There were dramatic price rises in the First World War, but a slump in the 1920s and 1930s, followed by more rises in World War II. In 1947 annual price reviews were introduced in an attempt to stabilise the market. After World War II there was a drive in UK agriculture to greater production until the late 1970s, resulting in intensive farming. More areas of marginal land were brought into production. There was increasing mechanisation of Scottish agriculture and farming became less labour-intensive. The UK membership of the European Economic Community (later the European Union) in 1972 began a change in orientation for Scottish farming. Some sectors, particularly hill sheep farming, became viable only with subsidies. A series of reforms to the CAP from the 1990s attempted to control over-production, limit incentives for intensive farming and mitigate environmental damage. A dual farm structure emerged, with agriculture divided between large commercial farms and small pluralised and diversified holdings.

== Modern agriculture ==
=== Land use ===
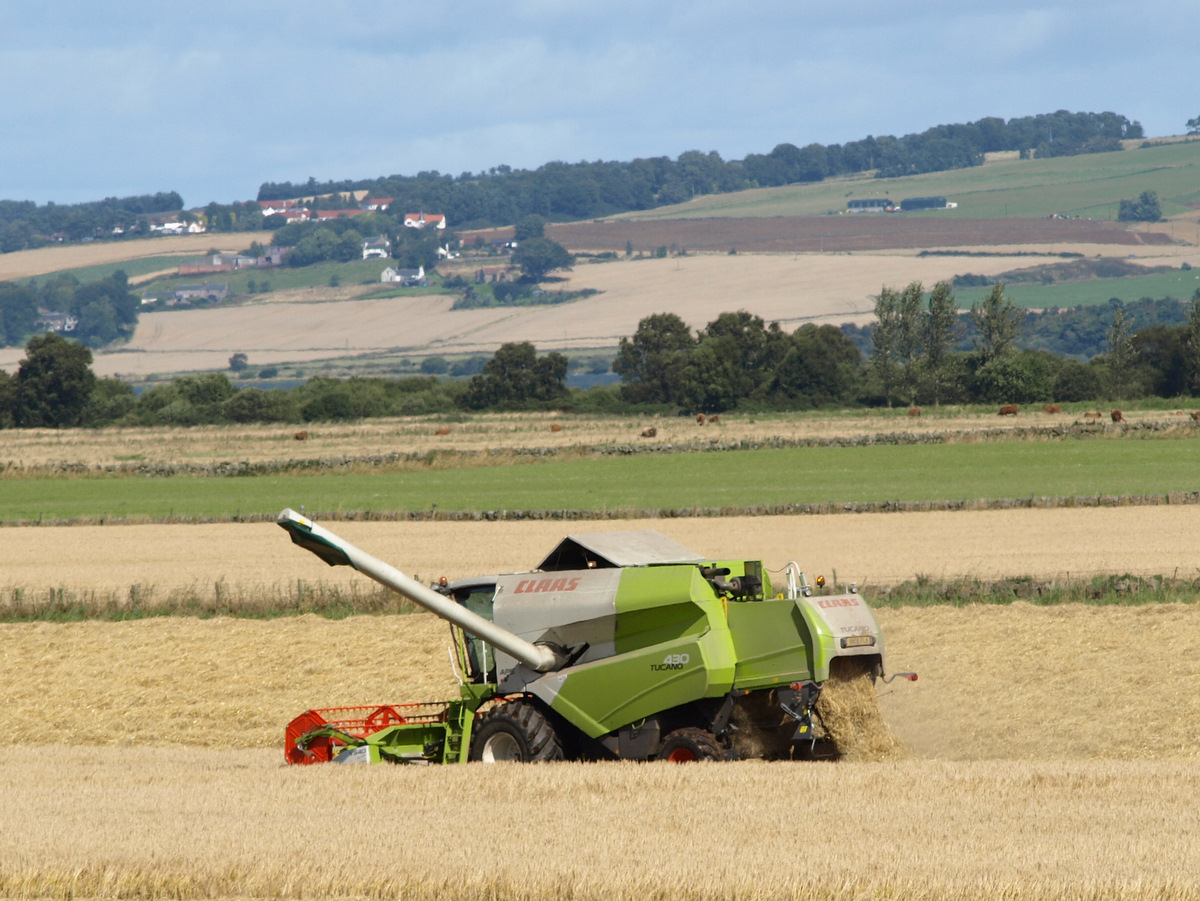
A combine harvester near Loch Leven

At the time of the June 2013 agricultural census the total area of agricultural holdings in Scotland was 5.6 million hectares, equal to 73 per cent of Scotland’s total land area. Just over half of this was rough grazing, with about a quarter taken up by grass, and about ten per cent used for crops or left fallow. The remainder was made up of woodland, ponds, yards or other uses. There was a further 580,000 hectares of common grazing, which if included made the total area 6.2 million hectares, or 79 per cent of Scotland’s total land area. Because of the persistence of feudalism and the land enclosures of the nineteenth century, the ownership of most land is concentrated in relatively few hands (some 350 people own about half the land). As a result, in 2003 the Scottish Parliament passed Land Reform (Scotland) Act 2003 that empowered tenant farmers and communities to purchase land even if the landlord did not want to sell.

In June 2013, of crops grown in Scotland (excluding grass), cereals accounted for 78 per cent of the land area, with nearly three-quarters of that being barley (340,000 hectares). Wheat was also significant (87,000 hectares), along with oilseed rape (34,000 hectares), oats (32,000 hectares) and potatoes (29,000 hectares). Amongst fruit and vegetables, a total of 911 hectares of strawberries were grown, mainly under cover, which was the largest source of income amongst horticulture crops. The major areas of cereal production were Grampian, Tayside, Borders, Lothian and Fife.

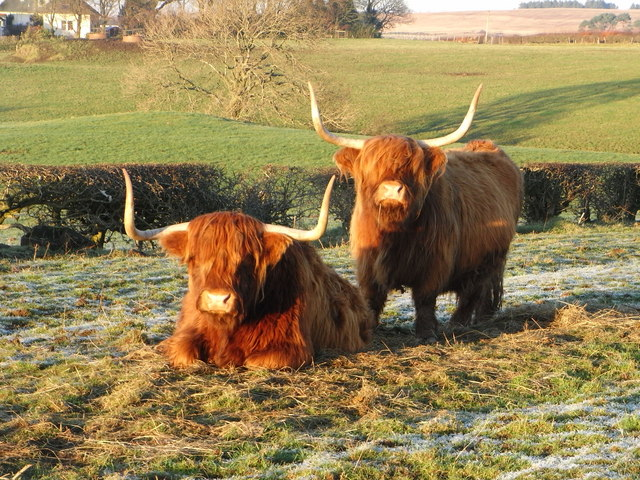
Distinctive Highland Cattle. Numbers of livestock, including cattle have been declining.

Livestock numbers have been falling in recent years. The trend began at the turn of the millennium in the case of pigs and sheep and dates to the mid-1970s in the case of cattle. In June 2013 there were 6.6 million sheep, 1.8 million cattle and 308,000 pigs, the lowest numbers since the 1940 and 1950s. Poultry numbers have tended to fluctuate over the last 25 years, but were down to 14.2 million in 2013.

About 13,340 km^{2} of land in Scotland is forested representing around 15 per cent of the total land area of Scotland. The majority of forests are in public ownership, with forestry policy being controlled by the Forestry Commission. The biggest plantations and timber resources are to be found in Dumfries and Galloway, Tayside, Argyll and the area governed by Highland Council. The economic activities generated by forestry in Scotland include planting and harvesting as well as sawmilling, the production of pulp and paper and the manufacture of higher value goods. Forests, especially those surrounding populated areas in Central Scotland also provide a recreation resource.

=== Income and employment ===
Total income from farming (TIFF) has been rising since the turn of the millennium. It was estimated at £700 million in 2012, being made up of £2.9 billion in outputs and £570 million in support payments, offset by £2.8 billion in costs. The initial estimate of TIFF for 2013 was £830 million, an increase largely linked to the improved weather. TIFF per annual work unit increased to £31,000, similar to the value in 2011.

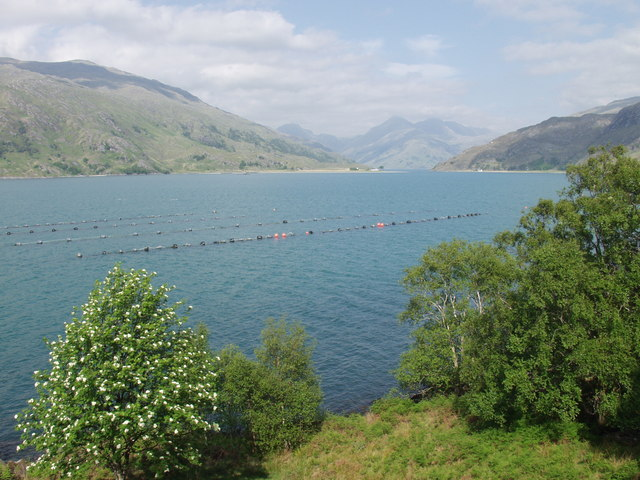
A fish farm near Tarbet on Loch Nevis

Aquaculture production is focused on the West and North of the country. The total output of aquaculture was estimated in 2011 at around £434 million per year, including around £412 million for farmed Atlantic salmon, £14.34 million for rainbow trout and £7.7 million for shellfish. Brown trout, sea trout, halibut and Arctic charr are also farmed in Scotland.

Some farm businesses rely on sources of income other than from farming, including contracting work, hosting mobile phone masts, tourism and recreation and financial support from grants and subsidies. Analysis of the Farm Accounts Survey suggests that, excluding support from grants and subsidies, the average farm made a loss of £16,000 in 2012. However, calculations from TIFF suggest that, excluding support, the sector still made a small profit.

Government figures indicate that in 2013 Scottish agriculture employed around 1.5 per cent of the workforce and contributes around 1 per cent of the Scottish economy. Other studies suggest the employment rate to be around 8 per cent of the total rural population, and in terms of numbers the estimates indicate that around 68,000 people are directly employed or self-employed in agriculture, while around 200,000 people are related to a variety of activities related to agriculture. In the Highlands and Islands, around 10 per cent of the workforce are engaged in agriculture and livestock products contribute around 70 per cent of the output.

== Education ==
The West of Scotland Agricultural College formed in 1899, the East of Scotland Agricultural College in 1901, and the North of Scotland Agricultural College in 1904; these colleges amalgamated to form the Scottish Agricultural College in 1990.

== Environmental protection ==
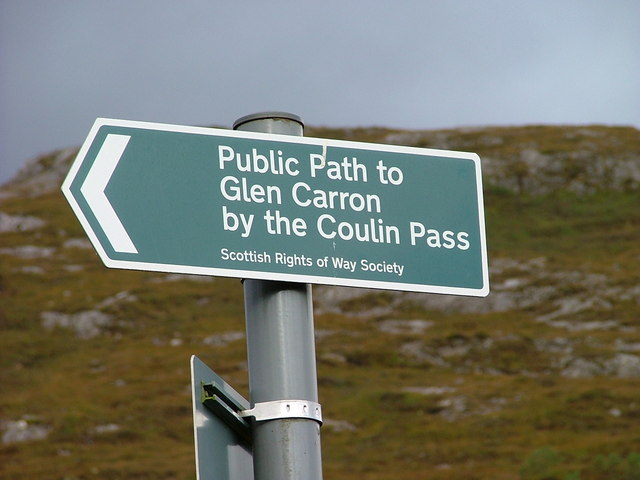
Scotways sign for a "Public Path"

Site-specific nature conservations began in the UK with the creation of the Nature Conservancy in 1948, which later became the Nature Conservancy Council (NCC). It moved from a research-based advisory group to become a campaigning body. The 1949 National Parks and Access to the Countryside Act excluded Scotland, but introduced the concept of Sites of Special Scientific Interest (SSSI), which were to become a key part of managing nature conservation. A Countryside Commission Scotland (CSS) was established under the Countryside Scotland Act, 1967. The SSSI were strengthened by the 1981 Wildlife and Countryside Act, which for the first time introduced the concept of payments to farmers for inactivity in relation to specific sites and shifted the burden of proof from conservationist having to prove harm, to landholders having to prove that harm was not taking place. The NCC was broken up in 1991 and in Scotland was merged with CSS to produce Scottish Natural Heritage (SNH), under a UK-wide Joint Nature Conservation Committee. SNH has a remit for both land and nature conservation and a responsibility towards sustainability and to the consideration of the needs of the Scottish people.

== Rights of way ==
In Scotland, a right of way is a route over which the public has been able to pass unhindered for at least 20 years. The route must link two "public places", such as villages, churches or roads. Unlike in England and Wales there is no obligation on Scottish local authorities to signpost or mark a right of way. However, the charity Scotways, formed in 1845 to protect rights of way, records and signs the routes. The Land Reform (Scotland) Act 2003 gives everyone statutory access rights to most land and inland water in Scotland, to non-motorized traffic, making the existence of rights of way less important in terms of access to land in Scotland. Certain categories of land are excluded from this presumption of open access, such as railway land, airfields and private gardens.

== See also ==
- Macaulay Institute
- Agriculture in the United Kingdom
- Crofting
- National Farmers' Union of Scotland
- National Museum of Rural Life
- Royal Highland Show
- Scottish Agricultural Science Agency
- Scottish Crofting Federation
- Scottish Executive Environment and Rural Affairs Department
- Scottish Land Court
