= Joanna MacKinnon =

Joanna MacKinnon (12 November 1878–26 August 1966) was a New Zealand plunket nurse. She was born in Balmeanach, near Camastianavaig on the island of Skye, Scotland on 12 November 1878. She was instrumental in the establishment of Royal New Zealand Plunket Society.
