= Ben Tianavaig =

Coordinates: 57.39020°N 6.14374°W

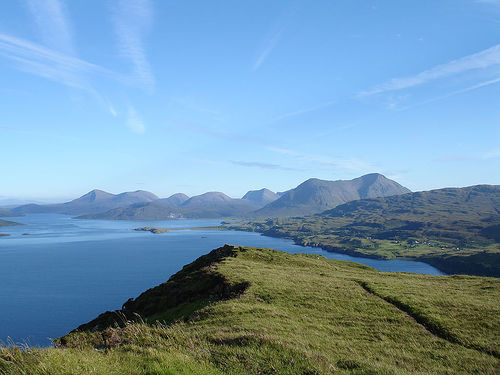
- Glamaig and the Broadford hills viewed from the upper slopes of Ben Tianavaig

Highest point
- Elevation: 413 m (1,355 ft)
- Prominence: c. 366 m
- Parent peak: Ben Lee
- Listing: Marilyn

Geography
- Location: Skye, Scotland
- OS grid: NG511409

Ben Tianavaig is a hill located on the Isle of Skye, near Portree. It is very prominent from Portree dominating the view from the harbour. It is a Marilyn (a hill with topographic prominence of at least 150 metres (490 ft)). It is most simply ascended from Camastianavaig. Despite its proximity to dwellings one could expect to see golden eagles and sea eagles from its ridge.
