= Crofting =

Form of land tenure particular to the Scottish Highlands

Crofting (Scottish Gaelic: croitearachd) is a form of land tenure and small-scale food production peculiar to the Scottish Highlands, the islands of Scotland, and formerly on the Isle of Man. Within the 19th-century townships, individual crofts were established on the better land, and a large area of poorer-quality hill ground was shared by all the crofters of the township for grazing of their livestock. In the 21st century, crofting is found predominantly in the rural Western and Northern Isles and in the coastal fringes of the western and northern Scottish mainland.

== History ==
=== Origins and history before 1886 ===
Crofting communities were a product of the Highland Clearances (though individual crofts had existed before the clearances). Previously, Highland agriculture was based on farms or bailtean, which had common grazing and arable open fields operated on the run rig system. An individual baile might have between five and ten families as tenants. As landowners sought to increase the income from their lands, the first step was the removal of the tacksmen. They were steadily eliminated over the last quarter of the 18th century. A tacksman (a member of the daoine uaisle, sometimes described as 'gentry' in English) was the holder of a lease or tack from the landowner. Where a lease was for a baile, the tacksman usually sublet to the farming tenants and may have provided some management oversight. Tacksmen were integral to the trade in black cattle out of the Highlands, providing an important role in the overall Highland economy. By preventing this section of society from sub-letting, the landlords obtained all of the rent paid by those who worked the land. Secondly, landowners replaced the older farming methods with pastoral systems, with leases being auctioned off to the highest bidder. In early cases, these new farms raised cattle. Much more common was the introduction of extensive sheep farms. Both required the eviction of the tenants of each baile. In many clearances, the tenants of inland farms were moved to crofting communities in coastal areas, often on poorer quality land. This type of clearance was carried out mostly until the 1820s.

Croft work was hard, back-breaking work which yielded a subsistence living. Aside from hay and oats, usually root vegetables, potatoes or cabbages were grown and peat would be cut by hand and left outside in various characteristic patterns of stacks to dry so as to serve later for fuel or sometimes for bedding for animals. Most crofters had sheep to shear and lamb. Some crofters had the care of small numbers of cattle.

The crofts created by clearance were not intended to support all the needs of those who lived there and consequently were restricted in size to a few acres of arable land with surrounding shared grazing. Landlords intended their crofting tenants to work in various industries, such as fishing or kelp. A contemporary estimate was that a crofter needed to carry out 200 days of work away from his croft in order to avoid destitution. In the second half of the 19th century, many crofters provided a substantial migrant workforce, especially for lowland farms.

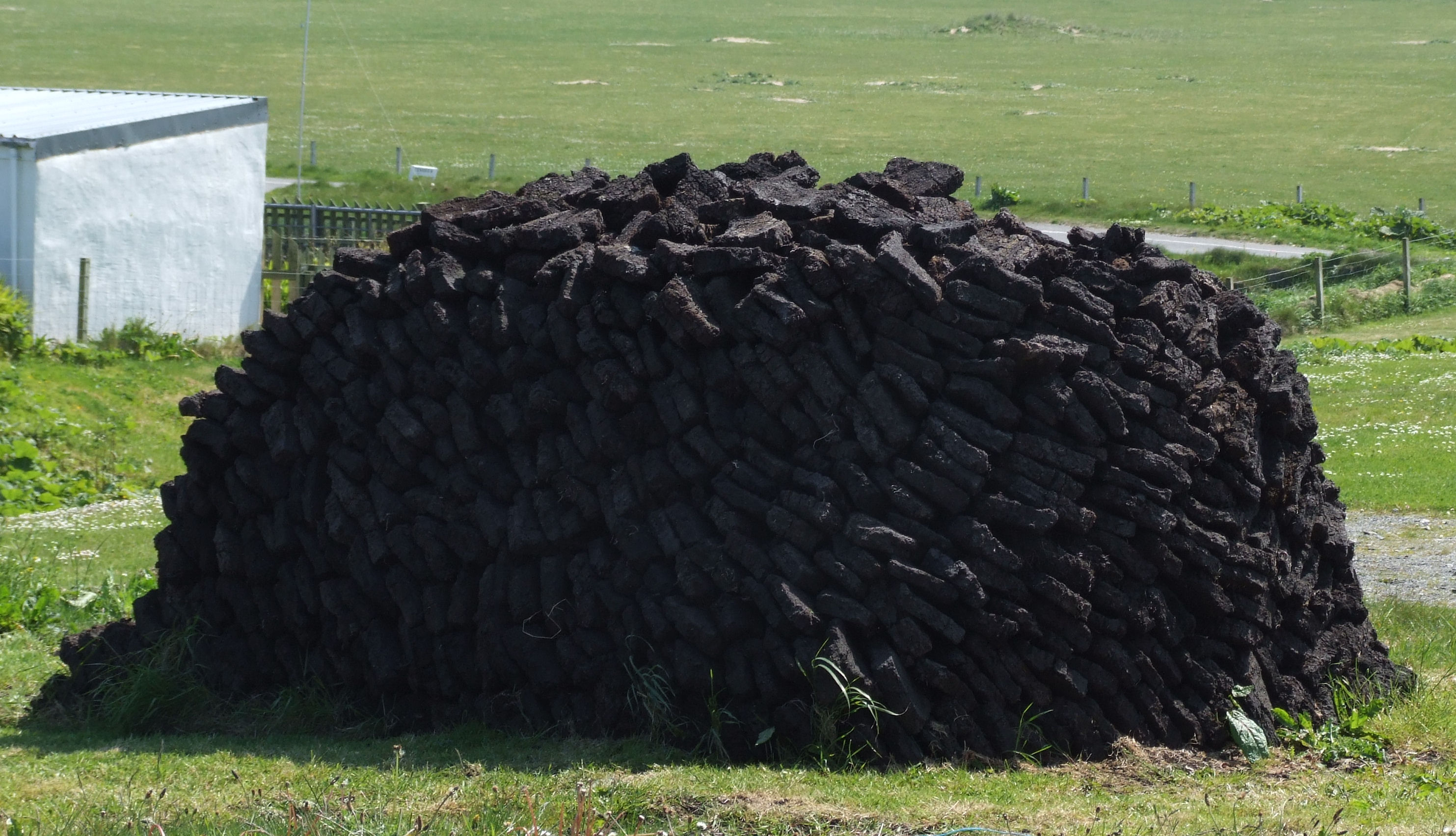
Modern stack of drying pattern-laid machine-cut peat turfs in Ness, the Outer Hebrides (2007). Traditional crofting involved heavy labour to make hand-cut turfs using wood-handled metal peat-cutters with a blade set at 90 degrees (a tushkar).

Crofting communities in the period 1846–56 were badly hit by the Highland Potato Famine. The small arable plots had meant that the potato was an essential crop, due to its high productivity. The arrival of potato blight (and the collapse of the kelp industry a few years before) made some crofting communities inviable. This gave rise to the second phase of the Highland Clearances, when many tenants left the Highlands, often emigrating. In 1852, in response to the poverty in the Highlands, Sir Charles Trevelyan and Sir John McNeill founded the Highland and Island Emigration Society, designed to save poor families from starvation by emigration to Australia.

In 1883, the Napier Commission was established. Though its recommendations were not accepted, the problem of poverty and insecurity of tenure in the Highlands was investigated. Consequent on this, the first Scottish crofting legislation of 1886 was enacted.

=== History 1886 onwards ===
The Crofters' Holdings (Scotland) Act 1886 (49 & 50 Vict. c. 29) provided for security of tenure, a key issue as most crofters remain tenants. The Act encouraged tenants to improve the land under their control, as it ensured that the control could be transferred within families and passed to future generations.

Crofters were given the right to purchase their individual crofts in 1976. In 2003, as part of the Land Reform Act, crofting community bodies were provided with the right to purchase eligible croft land associated with the local crofting community.

In 1974 the Laidhay Croft Museum near Dunbeath in Caithness was opened to preserve and enhance a two hundred year old thatched crofting longhouse with its agricultural buildings (barn and stables). The home is fully furnished and there are displayed farm and stable equipment.

In 2018 a section of the Sutherland Estate was bought out by a crofting community initiative, Garbh Allt Community Initiative Estate. The area amounted to 1,214 hectares (3,000 acres) of land and included the crofting townships of Gartymore, Portgower, Marrel and West Helmsdale. The £250,000 purchase money was made available in the form of two major contributions. These were: £273,000 from the Scottish government funded Scottish Land Fund; and £29,918 Beatrice Partnership Fund (a body connected to Beatrice windfarm in the Outer Moray Firth). The transfer of ownership was in favour of crofters, some of whom were descendants of people removed from the Sutherland Estate two centuries previously.

From the 1990s, a rural planning scheme in western West Lothian, central Scotland, borrowed the concept of subdividing land into holdings under the name 'Lowland Crofting'. To date, ten farms have entered the scheme, creating over 100 crofts along with extenside amenity woodlands, walks, and nature areas, with the best land retained in farming use.

== Statutory codes ==
=== Statutes ===
A key feature of crofting tenure is the highly developed network of legislation that has evolved since 1886. Crofting has been established and regulated in accordance with a series of statutes that have varied over time. The following six statutes have been repealed: the Crofters Holdings (Scotland) Act 1886; the Small Landholders (Scotland) Act 1911; the Small Landholders and Agricultural Holdings (Scotland) Act 1931; the Crofters (Scotland) Act 1955; the Crofters (Scotland) Act 1961; and the Crofting Reform (Scotland) Act 1976. In 1993 there was a consolidation of the legislation into the Crofters (Scotland) Act 1993.

As of 2023, the following four statutes together comprise the code of legislation applicable to crofting: the Crofters (Scotland) Act 1993; the Crofting Reform etc. Act 2007; the Crofting Reform (Scotland) Act 2010; the Crofting (Amendment) (Scotland) Act 2013.

=== Proposals for law reform ===
The Scottish government, due to the acknowledged complexity of the statutory codes, had a public consultation open until 2 September 2024 as to possible ways of simplifying the law.

== The Crofting Register ==
The Crofting Register is a public record available for consultation for free. It is kept by the Keeper of the Registers of Scotland. As at 12 September 2023 there were 9288 registered crofts and 335 registered common grazings. Registration can be voluntary but is compulsory in some circumstances. The Keeper offers online guidance in the form of a list as to events that trigger a mandatory registration. Registered boundaries of crofts are shown on a map and they are definitive. First registration may give rise to boundary disputes. The Scottish Land Court will determine the boundary and in the case of insufficient evidence has the power to fix the boundary where it thinks is appropriate.

== Crofting terms and management ==
A crofting tenancy is one from year to year but it carries security of tenure under the Crofters (Scotland) Act 1993 and in practice may therefore continue indefinitely whilst the tenant fulfils the terms of the tenancy. This reflects the basic protection granted in 1886. Other retained key features are now also contained in the consolidation of the 1993 Act. These are a right to compensation for improvements to the land, the right to pay a fair rent, and the right of bequest of the tenancy to a spouse or his family's next generation.

A valid crofting agreement can only be made with the prior consent of the Crofting Commission. Croft tenants are subject to the statutory conditions of tenure contained in section 5 and Schedule 2 of the Crofters (Scotland) Act 1993. Additionally, since 2010 they are subject to the statutory duties. These apply to all tenancies whether held under a written agreement or an oral agreement. The written terms are invalid in so far as they are inconsistent with the statutory provisions. Grazings regulations prevail over the terms of a tenancy agreement. These are regulations created by the crofters to manage their common grazings. The Scottish Government offers Guidance and a Regulations template to assist in the creation of rules. The template draft has been approved by the Crofting Commission. As of 12 June 2023 applications can be made online to the Crofting Commission in respect of assignations, decroftings, divisions and sublets.

A person taking an interest from the landlord takes subject to the rights of the crofter. In a case where almost a century had elapsed since the creation of an interest by the landlord but where there had been no formal resumption by permission obtained from the commission or the Scottish Land Court, the tenant was able to reclaim as part of the croft land that had been fenced off and supposedly taken away by such a transaction.

== Requirements ==
Tenants and owner-occupier crofters are required to comply with a range of duties specified in sections 5AA to 5C and 19C of the Crofters (Scotland) Act 1993 as amended. There is a duty to be ordinarily resident within 32 km of the croft. If the croft is the sole dwelling and the crofter's family are residents while the croft is away this would probably be accepted as ordinarily resident. Other circumstances involving other places of residence would require to be assessed individually. In addition to the duty of residential tenants and owner-occupiers crofters are required to ensure the croft is cultivated, maintained and not neglected or misused.

== Practice ==
=== Characteristics of crofting ===
Crofting is a traditional social system in Scotland defined by small-scale food production. Crofting is characterised by its common working communities, or "townships". Individual crofts are typically established on 2–5 hectares (5–12 1/2 acres) of in-bye for better quality forage, arable and vegetable production. Each township manages poorer-quality hill ground as common grazing for cattle and sheep.

From the early days, certain improvements were done to render land more amenable to cultivation. In particular, where the ground was heavy peat, the creation of ditches (and their regular maintenance) was essential. A feature probably special to crofting practice was the establishing of Lazy Beds (Gaelic: fiannegan). These were areas where turfs had been cut so two layers of turf lay on top of one another. Seaweed or kelp could be spread in between these layers to fertilise the soil. This left lower areas around the beds that could then act as drainage conduits.

Land use in the crofting counties is constrained by climate, soils, and topography. Since the late 20th century, the government has classified virtually all of the agricultural land in the Highlands and Islands as Severely Disadvantaged, under the terms of the Less Favoured Area (LFA) Directive, yet these areas reported in 2008-9 receiving the lowest LFA payments. Most crofters cannot survive economically by crofting agriculture alone, and they pursue a number of other activities to earn their livelihood.

The underlying potential of the crofting areas to produce a diverse local landscape and a more satisfactory diet for local people can be explored by analysis taking the agricultural values and practices of the pre-capitalist clan system in order to critique the view that the current Less Favoured Areas are intrinsically poorer. On that basis, "traditional" landscape and livestock-dominated practices are no more than the outcome of market dependency and should not be regarded as the inevitable measure of the potential of the land.

=== Economic significance ===
Despite its challenges, crofting is important to the Highlands and Islands. In 2014–2015 there were 19,422 crofts, with 15,388 crofters. Some crofters have the tenancy of more than one croft, and in-croft absenteeism means that tenancies are held but crofts are not farmed. About 33,000 family members lived in crofting households, or around 10% of the population of the Highlands and Islands. Crofting households represented around 30% of those in the rural areas of the Highlands, and up to 65% of households in Shetland, the Western Isles, and Skye. There were 770,000 hectares under crofting tenure, roughly 25% of the agricultural land area in the Crofting Counties. Crofters held around 20% of all beef cattle (120,000 head) and 45% of breeding ewes (1.5 million sheep). A report prepared for the Crofting Commission concluded in September 2024 that crofting created approximately £588 million in gross value added and supported 30,385 jobs.

=== Regulatory supervision ===
Crofting generally is regulated by the Crofting Commission, a public body of the Scottish Government. The activities of the Crofting Commission are regularly publicly reported. Section 51 of the Crofting Reform (Scotland) Act 2010 requires the Scottish Ministers to report to the Scottish Parliament on the economic condition of crofting and on steps taken by the Government and by the Crofting Commission to support crofting. The 2019-2022 Report is the most recent. The Crofting Commission in the Scottish Government Audit Scotland Crofting Commission Report 2020/2021 were considered as “falling below the standards expected of a public body in Scotland.” Remedial steps were consequently taken. The commission is bound by the Crofting Commission Model Code of Conduct. There is a scheme of delegation governing the handling of crofting matters.

There are as at 2024 nine Commissioners. Six are elected by crofters, and the remaining three are appointed by the Scottish Government. The names of the Commissioners, alongside detailed statements by way of declarations of interests are available online. The commission has its own support staff, and its main office is at Great Glen House, Leachkin Road, Inverness IV3 8NW. The staff is of approximately 70 civil servants with their Chief Executive appointed by the Scottish Ministers after discussion with the Commission Convenor.

The Convenor of the Crofting Commission from 2021 was Malcolm Mathieson. Andrew Thin was appointed Chair of the Crofting Commission as of February 2025.

=== Subsidies ===
Crofters may claim Basic Payment Scheme subsidy, which is administered by the Scottish Government, Rural Payments and Services.

=== Organisations of crofters ===
All crofters may join the Scottish Crofting Federation. In 2024 a support network for young crofters, the Western Isles Young Crofters, was founded to develop contacts and skills.

== Gaelic language ==
Historically, crofting has been linked to the Scottish Gaelic language. The Scottish Government supports the Gaelic language in the Gaelic Language Plan. The plan for 2022-2027 derives from the Gaelic Language (Scotland) Act 2005. In relation to crofting, the Scottish Land Court must accommodate the Scottish Gaelic language including by having a Gaelic-speaking member of the Court. Lord Minginish (Chairman of the Scottish Land Court 2014–2022) continues to hold office as a Gaelic-speaking member of the Court. There are provisions to ensure that at all times at least one member of the Crofting Commission (whether elected or appointed) is a Gaelic language speaker.

== Case reports ==
Reports of crofting litigation are a resource designed for lawyers that gives detailed information as to the families and the farms featured in the narrative. Since 1912 crofting cases in the Scottish Land Court have been reported, and are available. They are scattered in several series and locations. Where such cases are dealt with on appeal to the Court of Session, they can be traced online.

== Gallery ==
Crofting landscapes show great beauty but also the remote, harsh and unyielding nature of the terrain. Often historically combined with fishing or the exploitation of peat, potash, or seaweed, agriculture operates on an uneconomic scale. Consequently, other industries connected to wool such as weaving or knitting, or to distillery products such as whisky and gin have developed. In more recent times, wind-farming has created some additional financial support. Features of crofting townships include shared grazing areas.

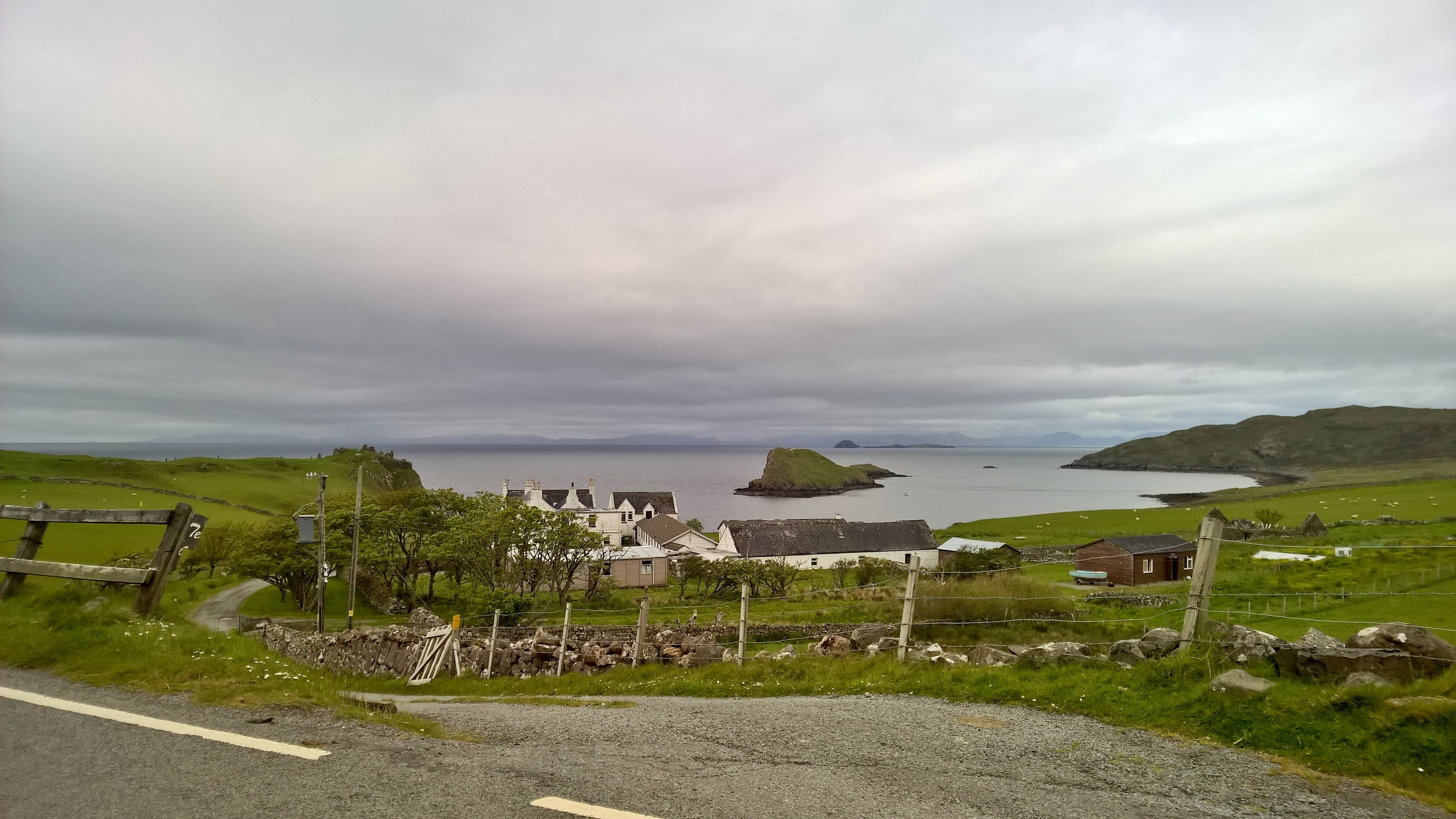
Port Duntulm (2015) on the Island of Skye in the Inner Hebrides. Duntulm is a crofting township. Sheep can be seen in the distance, held in stone-walled enclosures.

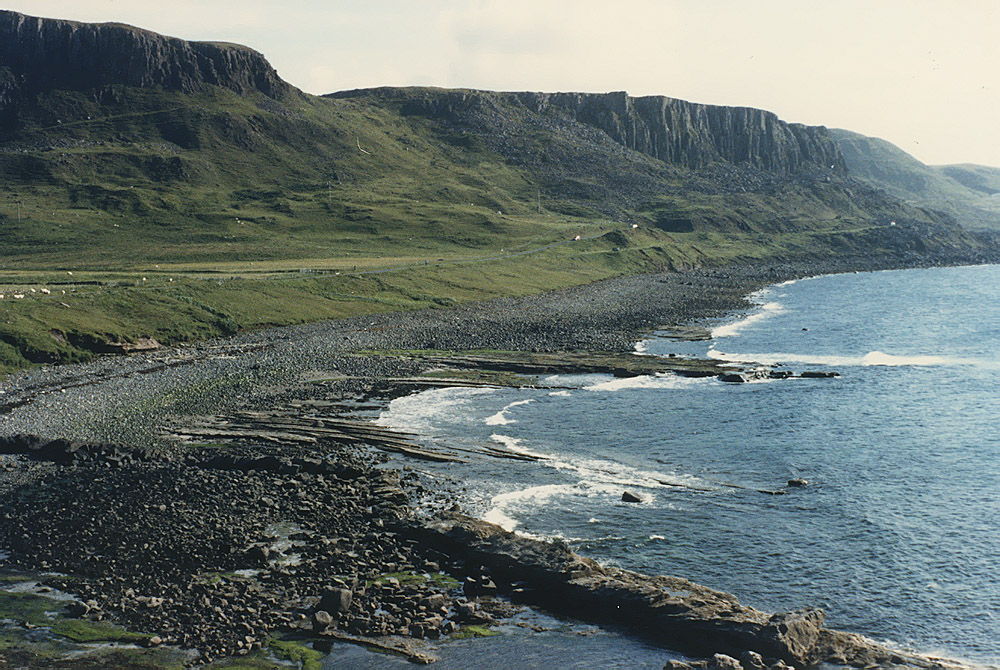
The coast south of Duntulm (1986) where barren high land is broken at lower level by farmable areas. The beach is bouldered. Housing is limited.

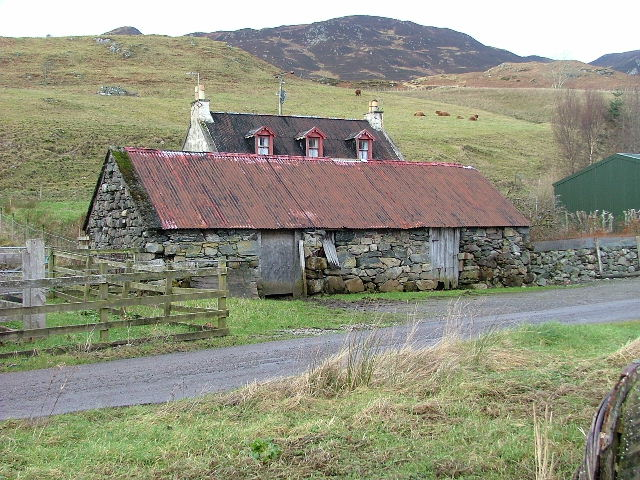
Croft in Upper Ardelve, a Highland settlement on Loch Alsh (2007). Image shows farmhouse behind a modest livestock shed. Cows graze the rear fields.

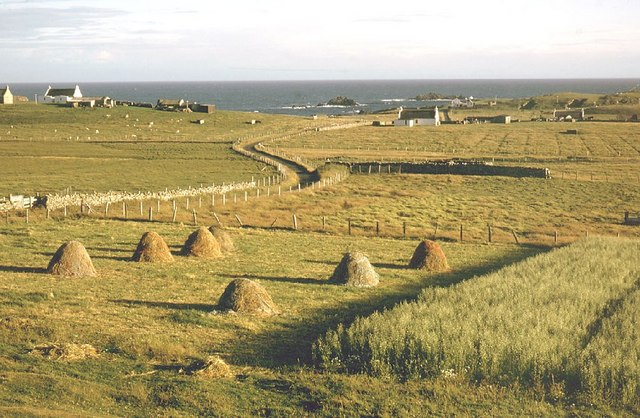
Crofting land of Fair Isle (1974). Image taken in August shows hay stacked in traditional stooks ready to be gathered and kept to feed livestock in the winter months.

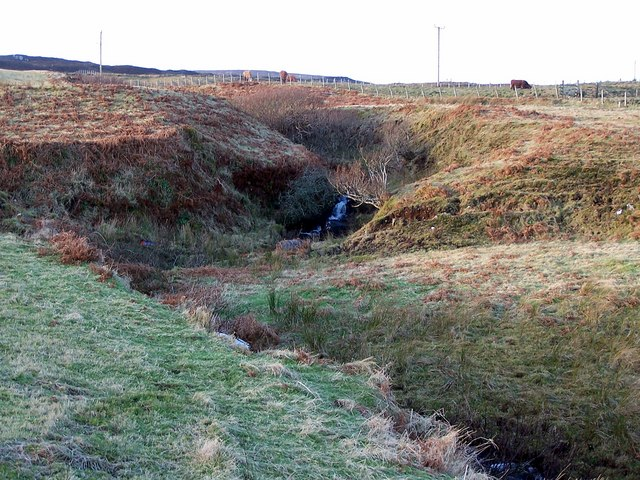
Boreraig Burn by Boreraig, a crofting town NW of Dunvegan on Skye (2008). Image shows the rough quality of land used for cattle grazing.

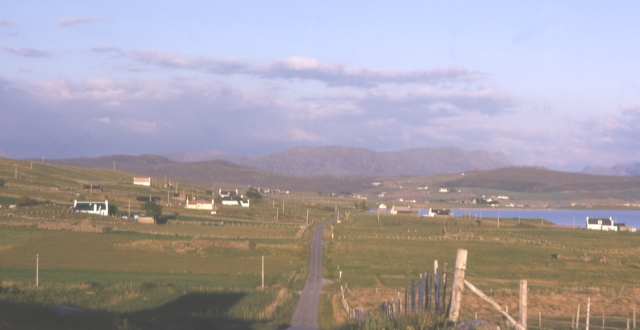
Crofting community in Ormiscaig by Loch Ewe, Wester Ross in the NW Highlands (1972). The layout and whitewash appearance of houses is characteristic of these settlements.

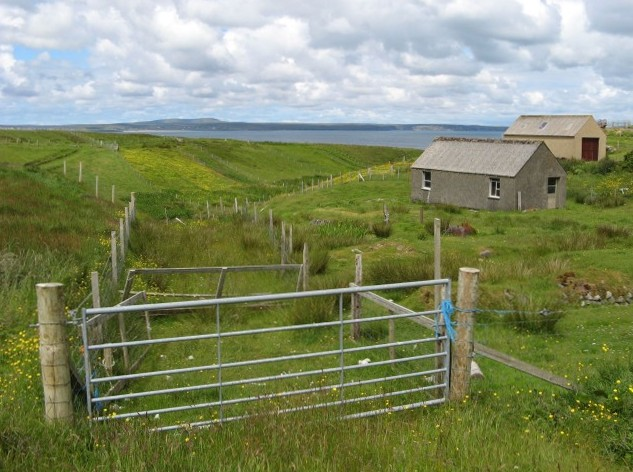
Garrabost on the north coast of the Eye Peninsula, Isle of Lewis, Outer Hebrides (2007). Image shows complicated fencing patterns necessary on crofting land; modern or modernised buildings in traditional design.

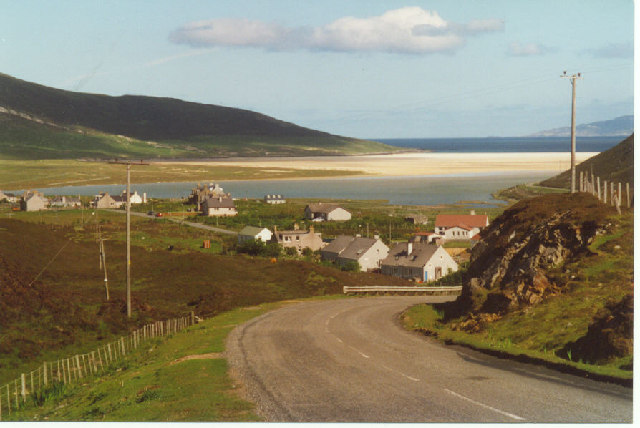
Taobh Tuath on the Island of Harris in the Outer Hebrides (2001). Image shows crofting settlement in relatively protected lower areas. Harris is famous for its tweed weaving industry.

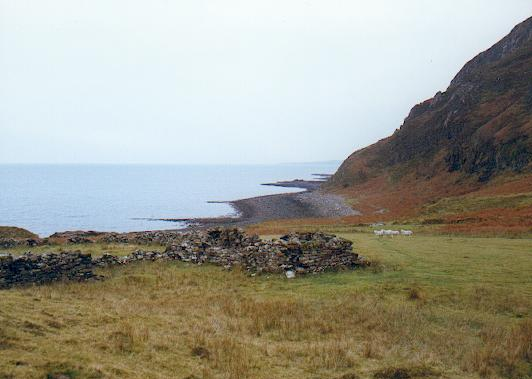
Ruined buildings (stone walls or foundations) are commonly seen in crofting areas. These are in the settlement of Boreraig, Skye which was cleared in 1853 and are probably remains of one of the houses that was abandoned at that time.

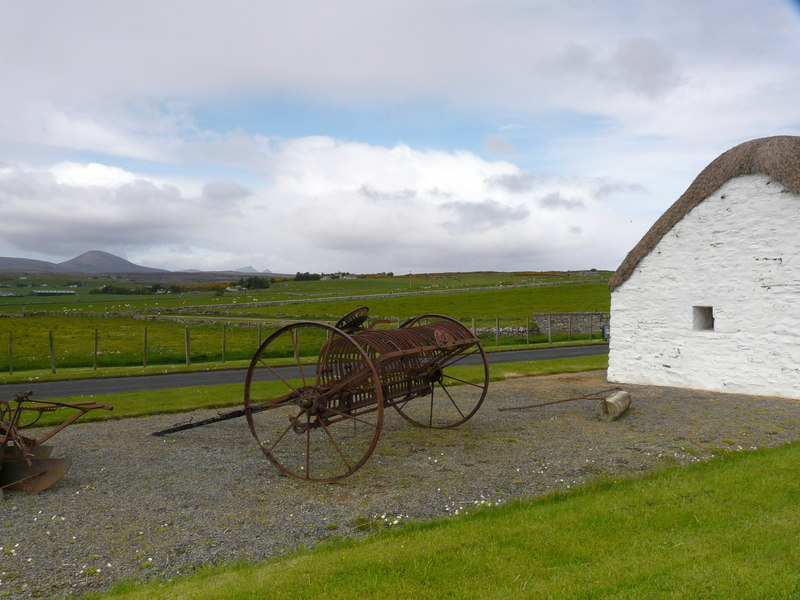
Laidhay Croft Museum (2011) displays a thatched longhouse with its contents and nineteenth century farm equipment.

== See also ==
- Agriculture in Scotland
- Croft
- Crofters Holdings (Scotland) Act 1886
- Highland Clearances
- Highland and Island Emigration Society
- Highland Potato Famine
