= Harald Leslie, Lord Birsay =

Scottish lawyer and judge

The Honourable Lord Birsay KT CBE TD DL

Chairman of the Scottish Land Court
- In office 1965–1978
- Preceded by: Lord Gibson
- Succeeded by: Lord Elliott

Personal details
- Born: Harald Robert Leslie; 8 May 1905
- Died: 27 September 1982 (aged 77)
- Spouse: Robina Margaret Marwick
- Education: University of Glasgow
- Profession: Advocate

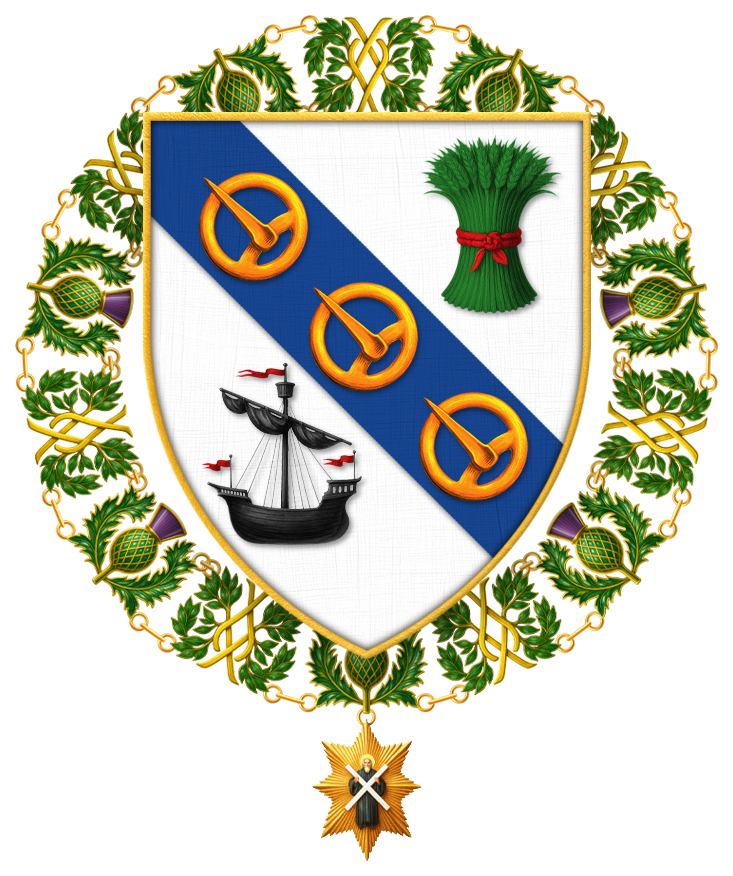
Shield of Arms of Sir Harald Robert Leslie, Lord Birsay

Harald Robert Leslie, Lord Birsay (8 May 1905 – 27 November 1982) was a Scottish lawyer and judge, and Chairman of the Scottish Land Court.

== Early life ==
Leslie was born on 8 May 1905, the son of Robert Leslie, Master Mariner, and educated at Earlston School, Berwickshire High School, and the High School of Glasgow. He studied at the University of Glasgow, first studying arts (MA, 1927) and then at the university's School of Law (LLB, 1930). He was admitted as a solicitor in 1930 and to the Faculty of Advocates in 1937. He had been a member of the Officers' Training Corps while at school and university, and during the Second World War served in the Royal Scots, being appointed a military Member of the Order of the British Empire (MBE) and mentioned in despatches.

== Legal career ==
Following the War, Leslie was appointed Standing Counsel to the Department of Agriculture, becoming an Advocate Depute in 1947. He was appointed Queen's Counsel in 1949, and in 1951 returned to private practice, having unsuccessfully contested Orkney and Shetland as the Labour candidate in the 1950 general election. In 1956, he was appointed Sheriff of Roxburgh, Berwick and Selkirk, and in 1961 as Sheriff of Caithness, Sutherland, Orkney and Zetland. He was appointed a civil Commander of the Order of the British Empire (CBE) in the 1963 Birthday Honours. In April 1965, he was appointed Chairman of the Scottish Land Court, taking the judicial title, Lord Birsay. He was appointed a Knight of the Thistle, Scotland's highest order of chivalry, in 1973. He retired in 1978, and was succeeded by Lord Elliott.

== Personal life ==
Leslie married Robina Margaret Marwick, a physician, in 1945, with whom he had a son and daughter. He maintained homes in Edinburgh and Birsay, Orkney, and was a member of the Caledonian Club and the Scottish Arts Club, Edinburgh. He served in 1965 and 1966 as Lord High Commissioner to the General Assembly of the Church of Scotland. In 1985, he was a founding trustee, along with writer and broadcaster Magnus Magnusson, of the Scottish Churches Architectural Heritage Fund. Lord Birsay died on 27 November 1982, aged seventy-seven.

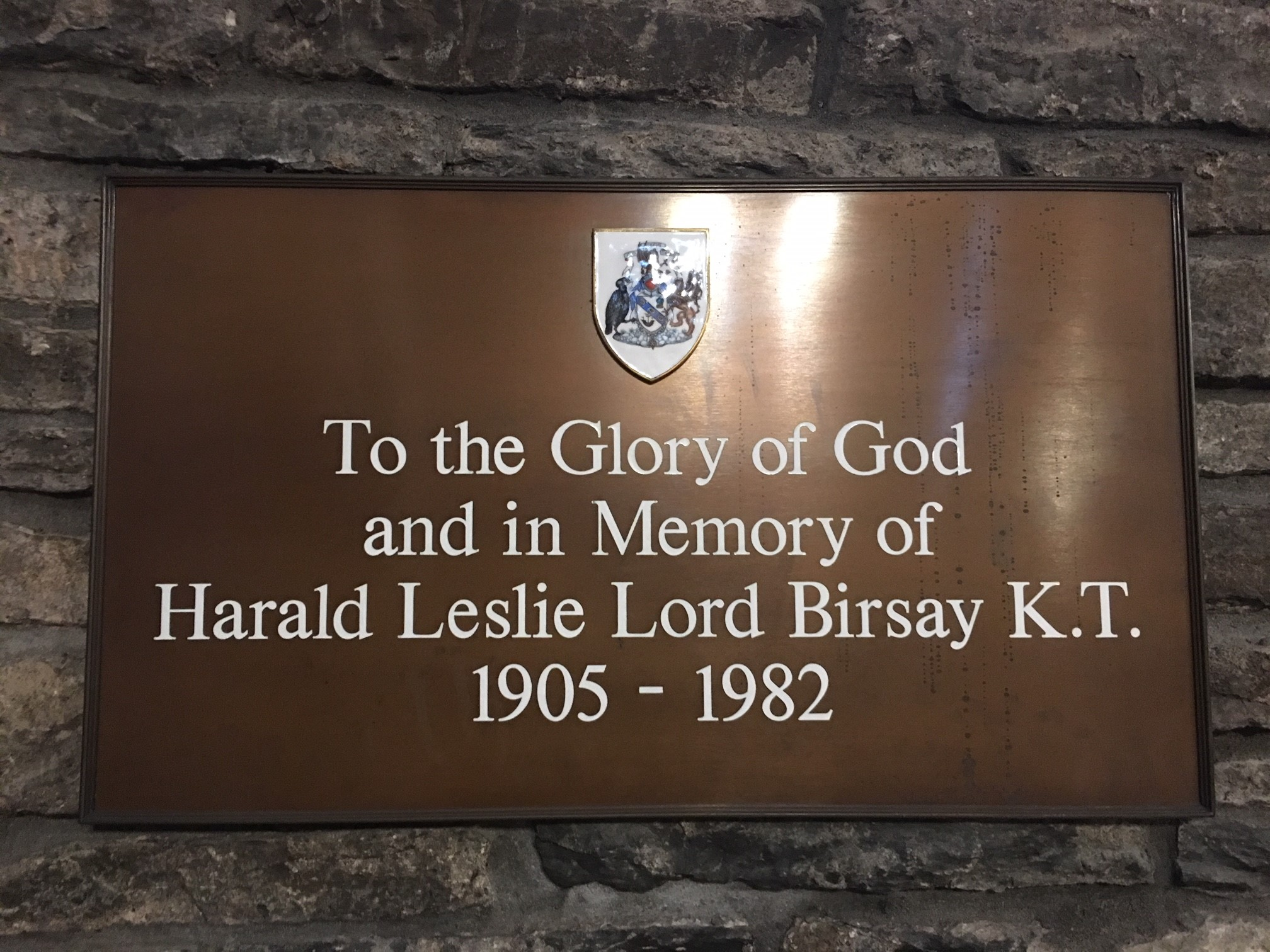
Harald Leslie Lord Birsay memorial in Kirkwall Cathedral, Orkney

== Sources ==
- "BIRSAY". Who Was Who, A & C Black, 1920–2008; online edn. Oxford University Press. December 2007.

Legal offices
Preceded by Lord Gibson	Chairman of the Scottish Land Court; 1965–1978	Succeeded by Lord Elliott
