= Euan Duthie, Lord Duthie =

Scottish judge (born 1975)

The Honourable Lord Duthie

Senator of the College of Justice
- Incumbent
- Assumed office 9 January 2023
- Nominated by: Nicola Sturgeon
- Monarch: Charles III
- Preceded by: Lord Minginish

Chair of the Scottish Land Court
- Incumbent
- Assumed office 9 January 2023
- Nominated by: Nicola Sturgeon
- Monarch: Charles III
- Preceded by: Lord Minginish

Personal details
- Education: University of St Andrews; University of Edinburgh

Charles Euan Duthie, Lord Duthie (born 28 June 1975), is a Scottish judge who has served as a senator of the College of Justice since 9 January 2023.

Lord Duthie is also the Chair of the Scottish Land Court and President of the Lands Tribunal for Scotland.

== Background ==
Duthie is the son of Charles Whytock Duthie, a company director, and Catherine née MacPherson. He was educated at George Heriot's School, and he studied at the University of St Andrews and the University of Edinburgh.

== Career ==
Between 2001 and 2003 Duthie trained as a solicitor, then was employed until 2005 at Burness Solicitors, Edinburgh. In 2006 he was admitted to the Faculty of Advocates, or called to the Bar. He held the position of Standing Junior Counsel to the Advocate General from 2012 to 2021. He was also a fee-paid judge of the First-tier Tribunal from 2014 to 2022. He held the position of ad hoc Advocate Depute in 2015. Between 2021 and 2023, before being appointed to the Land Court, Duthie was a sheriff at Perth Sheriff Court. As sheriff, Duthie's cases included various issues of dangerous driving, drugs, car chases, stalking, sexting, domestic abuse, drug smuggling, drug dealing, theft, suicide attempts and various issues of violence. From September 2019, he was a King's Counsel, and from 2023 he was Chair of the Scottish Land Court, and President of the Lands Tribunal for Scotland.

Duthie was a Lieutenant of the Royal Naval Reserve, and is now on the Retired List. He was appointed legal adviser to the European Union Naval Force in 2010, and served in the Volunteer Reserves in 2015. He was Chairman of Maltings (Berwick) Trust between 2018 and 2021.

Legal offices
| Preceded by Lord Minginish | Chairman of the Scottish Land Court; 2023–present | Incumbent |
| Preceded by Lord Minginish | President of the Lands Tribunal for Scotland; 2023–present | Incumbent |
