= Alexander Philip, Lord Philip =

Scottish lawyer

The Right Honourable Lord Philip

Senator of the College of Justice
- In office 1993–2007
- Succeeded by: Lord Woolman

Chairman of the Scottish Land Court and President of the Lands Tribunal for Scotland
- In office 1993–1996
- Preceded by: Lord Elliott
- Succeeded by: Lord McGhie

Personal details
- Born: Alexander Morrison Philip; 3 August 1942 (age 84)
- Education: St Andrews and Glasgow
- Profession: Advocate

Alexander Morrison Philip, Lord Philip, PC (born 3 August 1942) is a Scottish lawyer and former Senator of the College of Justice.

== Early life ==
The son of Alexander Philip, OBE and Isobel Thomson Morrison, Philip was educated at the High School of Glasgow, where he was a contemporary of Arthur Hamilton, former Lord President of the Court of Session. He studied at the University of St Andrews, graduating MA in 1963, and at the School of Law at Glasgow, taking an LLB in 1965. He subsequently practised as a solicitor between 1967 and 1972, before being admitted to the Faculty of Advocates in 1973. In 1982, he became Standing Junior Counsel to the Scottish Education Department, and between then and 1985 he served as an Advocate-Depute, taking silk in 1984.

== Judicial career ==
Between 1988 and 1992, Philip was Chairman of the Medical Appeal Tribunals, and in 1993 became Chairman of the Scottish Land Court and President of the Lands Tribunal for Scotland.

In 1996, Philip was appointed a Lord of Session and Lord Commissioner of Justiciary, a judge of the Court of Session and High Court, taking the judicial title, Lord Philip. He served for a time on the Judicial Studies Committee for Scotland, and was elevated to the Inner House in 2005. As is customary with such appointments, he was appointed to the Privy Council, affording him the style, The Right Honourable.

He retired from the Bench in 2007, but continued to sit on an occasional basis. In 2010-11 he chaired the Mull of Kintyre Review of evidence relating to the fatal Chinook helicopter crash on Kintyre on 2 June 1994, as a result of which the previous finding that the pilots of the aircraft had been guilty of gross negligence was set aside.

He was succeeded in the Inner House by Lord Reed, whose vacancy in the Outer House was filled by the newly appointed Lord Woolman.

== Personal life ==
Philip married Shona Mary Macrae in 1971,(m. diss. 2013) with whom he has three sons. He enjoys golf and piping, and is a member of the Royal Scottish Pipers' Society, the Honourable Company of Edinburgh Golfers

== Notes ==
Legal offices
Preceded by Lord Elliott	Chairman of the Scottish Land Court and President of the Lands Tribunal for Scotland; 1993–1996	Succeeded by Lord McGhie
