= Lands Tribunal (England, Wales and Northern Ireland) =

Act of the Parliament of the United Kingdom

Lands Tribunal Act 1949 (Note: Section 10(1).)
- Act of Parliament
- Parliament of the United Kingdom
- Long title: An Act to establish new tribunals to determine in place of official arbitrators and others certain questions relating to compensation for the compulsory acquisition of land and other matters, to amend the Acquisition of Land (Assessment of Compensation) Act, 1919, with respect to the failure to deliver a notice of claim, and for purposes connected therewith.
- Citation: 12, 13 & 14 Geo. 6. c. 42
- Territorial extent: United Kingdom

Dates
- Royal assent: 14 July 1949
- Commencement: England and Wales and Northern Ireland: 1 January 1950 (Note: Section 10(2). The Lands Tribunal Act (Appointed Day) Order 1949.); Scotland: 1 March 1971 (Note: Section 10(2). The Lands Tribunal Act 1949 (Appointed Day) (Scotland) Order 1971.)
Other legislation
Amends	Acquisition of Land (Assessment of Compensation) Act 1919
Amended by	Statute Law Revision Act 1953; Land Compensation Act 1961; Land Compensation (Scotland) Act 1963; Compulsory Purchase Act 1965; General Rate Act 1967; Judicial Pensions Act 1981; Statute Law (Repeals) Act 1989; Scotland Act 1998

Status: Amended

Text of statute as originally enacted

Revised text of statute as amended

Text of the Lands Tribunal Act 1949 as in force today (including any amendments) within the United Kingdom, from legislation.gov.uk.

The Lands Tribunal was a tribunal in the United Kingdom created by the Lands Tribunal Act 1949 (12, 13 & 14 Geo. 6. c. 42) that had jurisdiction in England and Wales and Northern Ireland, although in the Northern Ireland context the term Lands Tribunal normally refers to a different body, the Lands Tribunal for Northern Ireland. The Lands Tribunal was unusual in having both first instance and appellate jurisdiction. The functions of the Lands Tribunal were transferred to the Upper Tribunal in June 2009 by the Transfer of Tribunal Functions (Lands Tribunal and Miscellaneous Amendments) Order 2009.

== Jurisdiction ==
The Lands Tribunal was established to replace the panel of official arbitrators which had previously determined disputes as to compensation payable to the owners and occupiers of land affected by compulsory purchase. It additionally acted as the appellate tribunal hearing rating appeals from the valuation tribunals and had jurisdiction in relation to ordering the discharge or modification of restrictive covenants affecting land, under section 84 of the Law of Property Act 1925.

A major further jurisdiction was conferred under the Leasehold Reform Act 1967 which conferred upon the long leaseholders of lower value houses in England the right to acquire their freeholds, on terms laid out by statute. Disputes as to quantum were originally decided by the Lands Tribunal. In 1980 the original jurisdiction was transferred to the newly created leasehold valuation tribunals with the Lands Tribunal becoming the appellate tribunal on such disputes.

The Lands Tribunal also had a general appellate jurisdiction in relation to decisions of the leasehold valuation tribunals and residential property tribunals.

Appeals from the Lands Tribunal were heard in the Court of Appeal.

== Composition ==
The President of the Lands Tribunal had to be a solicitor or barrister, and the Members either solicitors, barristers, or persons experienced in the valuation of land.

== See also ==
- Lands Tribunal for Scotland
