= Archie Elliott, Lord Elliott =

Scottish judge (1922–2008)

The Honourable Lord Elliott MC

Chairman of the Scottish Land Court
- In office 1978–1992
- Preceded by: Lord Birsay
- Succeeded by: Lord Philip

President of the Lands Tribunal for Scotland
- In office 1971–1992
- Preceded by: New creation
- Succeeded by: Lord Philip

Personal details
- Born: Walter Archibald Elliott; 6 September 1922 London
- Died: 9 August 2008 (aged 85)
- Spouse: Susan Isobel Mackenzie Ross
- Education: Trinity College, Cambridge; University of Edinburgh
- Profession: Advocate

Walter Archibald Elliott, Lord Elliott, MC (6 September 1922 – 9 August 2008) was a Scottish lawyer and judge. In 1971, he became the first president of the newly established Lands Tribunal for Scotland, and in 1978 took on the additional office of chairman of the Scottish Land Court. Since then, both offices have been held concurrently.

== Early life ==
Elliott was born in London into a prosperous family. His father was physician Thomas Renton Elliott who would later be appointed Professor of Medicine at University College London, while his mother came from the McCosh family of Lanarkshire Iron and Coal Company of Coatbridge wealth. His parents lived in London's historic Cheyne Walk, Chelsea, and in Broughton Place, Scottish Borders, a tower house in the Scottish Baronial style designed by the then unknown Scottish architect Basil Spence in 1935, and completed in 1938.

He was educated at Sandroyd School, then Eton and began studying history at Trinity College, Cambridge, but interrupted his studies to join the Army in 1943. After the War, he completed his studies at Cambridge before returning to Scotland, studying at the School of Law of the University of Edinburgh.

== Military career ==
Elliott saw active service in the Second World War as an officer in the 2nd Battalion Scots Guards. He joined up in August 1943, and on 11 September that year led a platoon in an attack on a tobacco factory in Salerno. Captured by German troops, he escaped into the mountains and was awarded an immediate Military Cross for bravery. He later wrote two books based on his experiences: Us and Them: a study of group consciousness (1986), and Esprit de Corps (1996).

== Legal career ==
On completing his studies at Edinburgh in 1950, Elliott was called to the Bar of England and Wales at the Inner Temple, and admitted to the Faculty of Advocates in Scotland. He took up practice in Scotland, and was appointed Queen's Counsel in 1963. In 1971, he was appointed a chairman of the Medical Appeal Tribunals, and as president of the newly established Lands Tribunal for Scotland. In 1978, he was appointed chairman of the Scottish Land Court, retaining his position as president of the Lands Tribunal. Since his retirement in 1992, the positions have always been held together. He was succeeded by Alexander Philip, Lord Philip.

== Personal life ==
Elliott married Susan Isobel Mackenzie Ross in 1954, with whom he had two sons, Peter and Michael Elliott. He died on 9 August 2008.

Legal offices
Preceded by Lord Birsay	Chairman of the Scottish Land Court; 1978–1992	Succeeded by Lord Philip
New creation	President of the Lands Tribunal for Scotland; 1971–1992	Succeeded by Lord Philip
