= Lands Tribunal for Scotland =

- Crest of the Royal Coat of Arms of the United Kingdom in Scotland
- Established: 1971
- Jurisdiction: Scotland
- Location: Edinburgh
- Composition method: Appointed by the Lord President
- Authorised by: Lands Tribunal Act 1949
- Appeals to: Court of Session
- Number of positions: 3
- Website: www.lands-tribunal-scotland.org.uk

President
- Currently: Lord Duthie
- Since: 9 January 2023

The Lands Tribunal for Scotland (Scottish Gaelic: Tribiunal Fearainn na h-Alba) is a tribunal with jurisdiction over land and property in Scotland, relating to title obligations, compulsory purchase and other private rights. The Tribunal was established under the Lands Tribunal Act 1949, which also created the separate Lands Tribunal in England and Wales and Northern Ireland.

Although the statutory basis of the Lands Tribunal for Scotland was the Lands Tribunal Act 1949, the Tribunal itself was not actually created until 1971, as there was not considered a sufficient amount of work to be undertaken. The Conveyancing and Feudal Reform (Scotland) Act 1970 gave the Lands Tribunal new powers to discharge title conditions, which prompted its actual establishment in March 1971.

The Tribunal is based in George House, on George Street in Edinburgh.

== History ==
The Tribunal was established under the Lands Tribunal Act 1949, which also created the separate Lands Tribunal in England and Wales and Northern Ireland.

Although the statutory basis of the Lands Tribunal for Scotland was the Lands Tribunal Act 1949, the Tribunal itself was not actually created until 1971, as there was not considered a sufficient amount of work to be undertaken. The Conveyancing and Feudal Reform (Scotland) Act 1970 gave the Lands Tribunal new powers to discharge title conditions, which prompted its actual establishment in March 1971.

== Remit and jurisdiction ==
The jurisdiction of the Lands Tribunal is over land and property in Scotland, relating to title obligations, Right to Buy, compulsory purchase and other private rights.

The Lands Tribunal for Scotland specifies that the main areas of work are:

- the discharge or variation of title conditions
- tenants’ rights to purchase their public sector houses
- disputed compensation for compulsory purchase of land or loss in value of land caused by public works
- valuations for rating on non-domestic premises
- appeals against the Keeper of the Registers of Scotland
- appeals about valuation of land on pre-emptive purchase
- voluntary or joint references in which the Tribunal acts as arbiter.

== Judges and office holders ==
The Tribunal is currently composed of a President and two other members. The number of posts are determined by the Scottish Ministers and members are appointed by the Lord President of the Court of Session under Section 2 of the Lands Tribunal Act 1949. The Lord President must consult the Scottish Branch of the Royal Institution of Chartered Surveyors before appointing anyone other than the President. The President of the Lands Tribunal must be legally qualified having previously served in judicial office, or be an Advocate or solicitor.

The first President of the Tribunal, Walter Elliott, was appointed Chairman of the Scottish Land Court in 1978, and since then both offices have been held together, although the courts remain separate. The President of the Lands Tribunal is not accorded membership of the College of Justice (and subsequently the judicial title, Lord) by virtue of this position but through Chairmanship of the Land Court. The Tribunal should also contain members legally qualified with experience as an advocate or solicitor, and those experienced in the valuation of land, who are to be appointed by the Lord President after consulting the Scottish Chairman of the Royal Institution of Chartered Surveyors. The current President is Lord Duthie who was appointed on 9 January 2023.

As of February 2023 the members of the Tribunal were:

- Lord Duthie (President)
- Ralph A Smith QC
- Andrew Oswald FRICS

=== Presidents of the Lands Tribunal ===
- 1971 - 1992: Archie Elliott, Lord Elliott
- 1993 - 1996: Alexander Philip, Lord Philip
- 1996 – 2014: James McGhie, Lord McGhie
- 2014 – 2022: Roderick John MacLeod, Lord Minginish
- 2023 – present: Lord Duthie

== See also ==
- Lands Tribunal
- Lands Tribunal for Northern Ireland
- Scottish Land Court
