= Gartymore =

Coordinates: 58.1115°N 3.6763°W

Gartymore: Scottish Gaelic: Gartaidh Mòr
- Location within the Sutherland area
- OS grid reference: ND022145
- Council area: Highland
- Lieutenancy area: Sutherland
- Country: Scotland
- Sovereign state: United Kingdom
- Post town: Helmsdale
- Postcode district: KW8 6
- Police: Scotland
- Fire: Scottish
- Ambulance: Scottish

Gartymore (Scottish Gaelic: Gartaidh Mòr) is an area, lying on the east coast of Sutherland and located less than 0.5 miles south west of Helmsdale, close to West Helmsdale, in the Scottish Highlands and is in the Scottish council area of Highland.
