= James McGhie, Lord McGhie =

Scottish lawyer (born 1944)

The Honourable Lord McGhie

Chairman of the Scottish Land Court and President of the Lands Tribunal for Scotland
- In office 1996–2014
- Monarch: Elizabeth II
- Preceded by: Lord Philip
- Succeeded by: Lord Minginish

Personal details
- Born: James Marshall McGhie; 15 October 1944 (age 81)
- Spouse: Ann Manuel Cockburn
- Education: University of Edinburgh
- Profession: Advocate

James Marshall McGhie, Lord McGhie is a Scottish lawyer who until 2014 was the Chairman of the Scottish Land Court and President of the Lands Tribunal for Scotland, and a Senator of the College of Justice.

== Personal life ==
=== Education ===
McGhie was educated at Perth Academy, and studied at the School of Law of the University of Edinburgh. He was admitted to the Faculty of Advocates in 1969.

=== Family ===
He married Anne Cockburn in 1968, with whom he has a son and a daughter.

== Legal career ==
McGhie was appointed Queen's Counsel in 1983, and served as an Advocate Depute from 1983 to 1986. From 1987 to 1992, he was part-time Chairman of the Medical Appeal Tribunal, and from 1992 to 1996 was a Member of the Criminal Injuries Compensation Board. In 1996, he was appointed Chairman of the Scottish Land Court and President of the Lands Tribunal for Scotland, with the judicial title, Lord McGhie. In 2016 Lord McGhie was appointed as Judge to the Abu Dhabi Global Market Courts (ADGM Courts).

== See also ==
- Scottish Land Court
- Lands Tribunal for Scotland
- List of Senators of the College of Justice

Legal offices
| Preceded by Lord Philip | Chairman of the Scottish Land Court; 1996–2014 | Succeeded by Lord Minginish |
