= Loch Fada =

Loch in Scotland

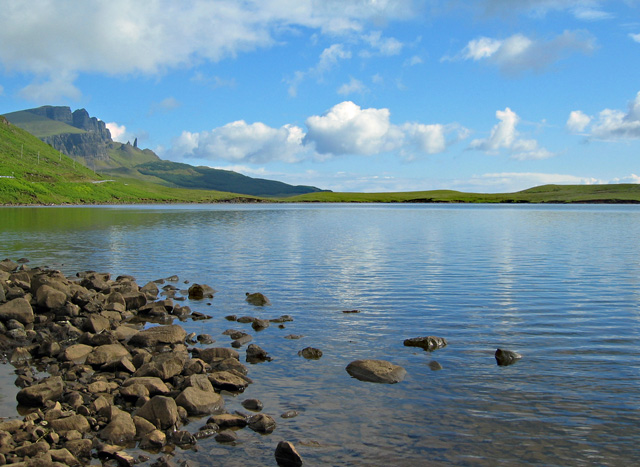
- Loch Fada from its south shore, with The Storr visible in the background

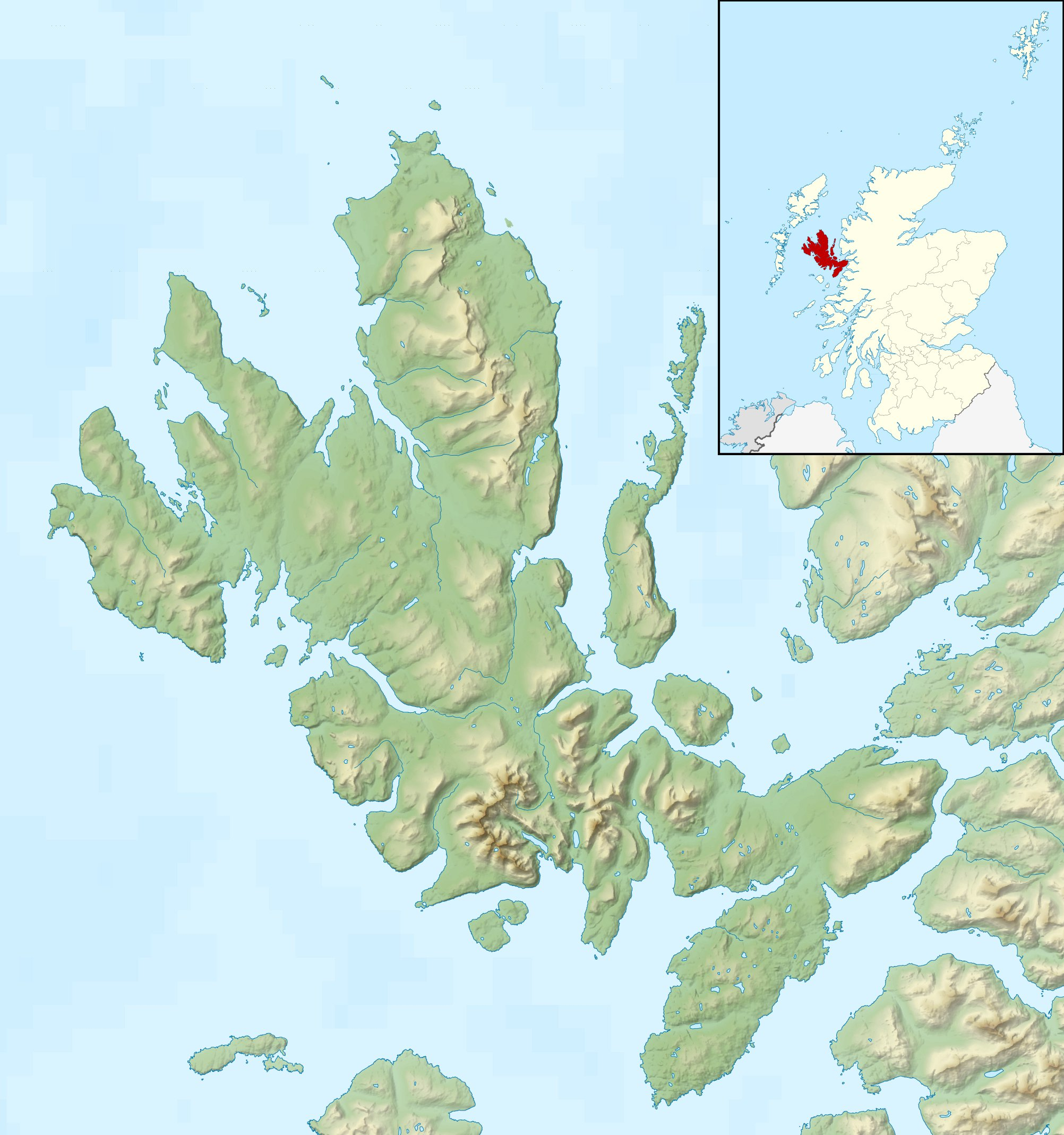
- Location within Isle of Skye
- Location: Isle of Skye
- Coordinates: 57°27′55.3″N 6°10′55.6″W
- Primary inflows: Lòn Coire na h-Airidh
- Primary outflows: Loch Leathan
- Basin countries: Scotland, United Kingdom
- Max. length: 1.40 km (0.87 mi)
- Max. width: 301 m (988 ft)
- Surface elevation: 144 m (472 ft)

Loch Fada is a freshwater loch on the Isle of Skye, Scotland, which flows directly into Loch Leathan. Together, the two lochs are known as the Storr Lochs. It is roughly 3.9km south of the Old Man of Storr, and 3.5km north of Portree, the closest settlement.

Fada is Scottish Gaelic for "long". Its name refers to the loch's long and narrow shape, which sits in a bed of Jurassic era limestone and mudstone.

The Storr Lochs act as reservoirs for the hydroelectric dam in Bearreraig Bay, which the North of Scotland Hydro-Electric Board built in the 1950s.

Today, Loch Fada is a popular sightseeing and trout fishing spot.
