= Crofters (Scotland) Act 1993 =

Act of the Parliament of the United Kingdom

Crofters (Scotland) Act 1993 (Note: Section 64(1).)
- Act of Parliament
- Parliament of the United Kingdom
- Long title: An Act to consolidate certain enactments relating to crofting, with amendments to give effect to recommendations of the Scottish Law Commission.
- Citation: 1993 c. 44
- Territorial extent: Scotland (Note: Section 64(3).)

Dates
- Royal assent: 5 November 1993
- Commencement: 5 January 1994 (Note: Section 64(2).)

Other legislation
- Amends: See § Repealed enactments
- Repeals/revokes: See § Repealed enactments
- Amended by: Requirements of Writing (Scotland) Act 1995; Planning (Consequential Provisions) (Scotland) Act 1997; Scotland Act 1998 (Consequential Modifications) (No.2) Order 1999; Abolition of Feudal Tenure etc. (Scotland) Act 2000; Title Conditions (Scotland) Act 2003; Agricultural Holdings (Scotland) Act 2003; Civil Partnership Act 2004; Civil Partnership Act 2004 (Consequential Amendments) (Scotland) Order 2005; Crofting Reform etc. Act 2007; Crofting Reform (Scotland) Act 2010; Crofting (Amendment) (Scotland) Act 2013; Housing (Scotland) Act 2014; Land Reform (Scotland) Act 2016; Bankruptcy (Scotland) Act 2016; Land Reform (Scotland) Act 2025; Crofting and Scottish Land Court Act 2026
- Relates to: Scottish Land Court Act 1993

Status: Amended

Text of statute as originally enacted

Revised text of statute as amended

Text of the Crofters (Scotland) Act 1993 as in force today (including any amendments) within the United Kingdom, from legislation.gov.uk.

The Crofters (Scotland) Act 1993 (c. 44) is an act of the Parliament of the United Kingdom that consolidated enactments relating to crofting in Scotland.

== Provisions ==
=== Repealed enactments ===
Section 63(2) of the act repealed 8 enactments, listed in parts I and II of schedule 7 to the act, respectively.

Enactments repealed so far as they apply in the crofting counties
Citation	Short title	Extent of repeal
49 & 50 Vict. c. 29	Crofters (Scotland) Act 1886	Section 30.
49 & 50 Vict. c. 29	Crofters (Scotland) Act 1886	Section 33.
1 & 2 Geo. 5. c. 49	Small Landholders (Scotland) Act 1911	Section 28.
1976 c. 21	Crofting Reform (Scotland) Act 1976	Section 17(2).

Other enactments repealed
Citation	Short title	Extent of repeal
3 & 4 Eliz. 2. c. 21	Crofters (Scotland) Act 1955	The whole act.
9 & 10 Eliz. 2. c. 58	Crofters (Scotland) Act 1961	The whole act.
1976 c. 21	Crofting Reform (Scotland) Act 1976	The whole act except section 17.
1985 c. 73	Law Reform (Miscellaneous Provisions) (Scotland) Act 1985	Sections 30 and 31.
1991 c. 18	Crofter Forestry (Scotland) Act 1991	The whole act.
