= Croft (land) =

Small area of agricultural land

The Shetland Crofthouse Museum at Dunrossness, Shetland

A croft is a traditional Scottish term for a fenced or enclosed area of land. It is usually small and arable, and typically, though not always, includes a crofter's dwelling. A crofter is a person who has tenure and use of the land, typically as a tenant farmer in rural areas.

In Northern England, "crofter" was a term associated with tenant farming and rural employment. For example, in the textiles industry, it referred to someone who bleached cloth prior to dyeing by laying it out in fields known as "crofts".

== Etymology ==
The word croft is West Germanic in etymology, derived from the Dutch term kroft or krocht and the Old English croft (itself of debated origin), meaning an enclosed field. Today, the term is used most frequently in Scotland, most crofts being in the Highlands and Islands area. Elsewhere the expression is generally archaic. In Scottish Gaelic, it is rendered croit (pronounced [kʰɾɔʰtʲ], plural croitean [ˈkʰɾɔʰtʲən]).

== Legislation in Scotland ==
The Scottish croft is a small agricultural landholding of a type that has been subject to special legislation applying to the Scottish Highlands since 1886. The legislation was largely a response to the complaints and demands of tenant families who were victims of the Highland Clearances. The modern crofters or tenants appear very little in evidence before the beginning of the 18th century. They were tenants at will underneath the tacksman and wadsetters, but practically their tenure was secure enough. The first evidence that can be found of small tenants holding directly of the proprietor is in a rental of the estates of Sir D. MacDonald in Skye and North Uist in 1715.

The first planned crofting townships in the Outer Hebrides were Barraglom and Kirkibost (Great Bernera) which were laid out into 32 large "lots" of between 14 and 30 acres in the uniform rectangular pattern that would become very familiar in later decades. This work was carried out in 1805 by James Chapman for the Earl of Seaforth.

The first edition of the Ordnance Survey in 1850 clearly highlights the division of this land and the turf and stone boundaries built by the first tenants in 1805 are still in use today as croft boundaries. Kirkibost was 'cleared' of its tenants in 1823 and the 1850 mapping clearly shows roofless ruins on each parcel of land. The township was however re-settled in 1878 following the Bernera Riot four years earlier using exactly the same division boundaries set out in 1805.

The Parliament of the United Kingdom created the Crofters' Act 1886, after the Highland Land League had gained seats in that parliament. The government was then Liberal, with William Ewart Gladstone as Prime minister. Another Crofters' Act was created in 1993 (the Crofters' (Scotland) Act 1993). The earlier Act established the first Crofting Commission, but its responsibilities were quite different from those of the newer Crofters Commission created in 1955. The Commission is based in Inverness.

Crofts held subject to the provisions of the Crofters' Acts are in the administrative counties of Shetland, Orkney, Caithness, Sutherland, Ross-shire, Inverness-shire and Argyll, in the north and west of Scotland. Under the 1886 legislation (the Crofters' Holdings (Scotland) Act) protected crofters are members of a crofters' township, consisting of tenants of neighbouring crofts with a shared right to use common pasture. Since 1976 it has been legally possible for a crofter to acquire the title to their croft, thus becoming an owner-occupier.

The Land Reform (Scotland) Act 2003 gives crofters the right to buy their land.

== See also ==
- Crofting
- Torp (architecture)
