= Crofting Commission =

Scottish regulatory agency

- Coimisean na Croitearachd (Scottish Gaelic)

Agency overview
- Formed: 2012
- Type: executive non-departmental public body
- Jurisdiction: Crofting Counties
- Headquarters: Crofting Commission, Great Glen House, Leachkin Road, Inverness, IV3 8NW
- Agency executives: Andrew Thin, Convener; Gary Campbell, Chief Executive
- Parent agency: Scottish Government
- Website: www.crofting.scotland.gov.uk

Map
- Scotland in the UK and Europe

The Crofting Commission (Scottish Gaelic: Coimisean na Croitearachd) took the place of the Crofters Commission (Scottish Gaelic: Coimisean nan Croitearan) on 1 April 2012 as the statutory regulator for crofting in Scotland. Based in Inverness, it is an executive non-departmental public body of the Scottish Government. The commission comprises six Crofting commissioners elected from geographic areas in the crofting counties, and three commissioners appointed by the Scottish Government. The convener is appointed from among commission members. The commission is supported by around 60 staff led by a chief executive.

The vision of the commission is to be a guiding regulator that uses its powers to support the crofting system. Its purpose is to regulate the crofting system fairly and reasonably to protect it for future generations.

The Commission encourages crofters to understand their legal responsibilities as crofts are a valuable resource that should be available both now and in the future for existing crofters and new entrants to crofting to use productively.

All crofters, both tenant and owner-occupier crofters, are required to comply with a number of statutory duties relating to residency and management of their crofts.

All tenants or owner-occupier crofters of a croft have a legal duty to comply with all three of the following duties:

1. Be ordinarily resident on, or within 32 kilometres (20 mi) of, their croft;
2. Cultivate and maintain their croft or put it to another purposeful use and
3. Not to misuse or neglect their croft.

Self-regulation means crofters stay in control over what happens to their croft, choosing options so they can contribute to the future of the croft, township and to the whole system of crofting.

However, where a crofter fails to comply with their duties the commission can investigate the breach of duty and take action if necessary. Where a suspected breach has occurred, members of crofting community; Grazings Committees/Constables and Assessors can report crofters who they consider are not complying with their duties to the commission.

The first Crofters Commission was established by the Crofters' Holdings (Scotland) Act 1886. The modern Crofters Commission was established by the Crofters (Scotland) Act 1955. The name of the Commission changed to the Crofting Commission in 2012 following the coming into force of the Crofting Reform (Scotland) Act 2010.
