= Crofters Holdings (Scotland) Act 1886 =

Act of the Parliament of the United Kingdom governing land tenure in Scotland

Crofters Holdings (Scotland) Act 1886 (Note: Section 35.)
- Act of Parliament
- Parliament of the United Kingdom
- Long title: An Act to amend the Law relating to the Tenure of Land by Crofters in the Highlands and Islands of Scotland, and for other purposes relating thereto
- Citation: 49 & 50 Vict. c. 29
- Territorial extent: United Kingdom

Dates
- Royal assent: 25 June 1886
- Commencement: 25 June 1886 (Note: The Acts of Parliament (Commencement) Act 1793.)
Other legislation
Amended by	Crofters Holdings (Scotland) Act 1887; Statute Law Revision Act 1898; Small Landholders (Scotland) Act 1911; Small Landholders And Agricultural Holdings (Scotland) Act 1931; Reorganisation of Offices (Scotland) Act 1939; Succession (Scotland) Act 1964; Crofting Reform (Scotland) Act 1976; Inshore Fishing (Scotland) Act 1984; Roads (Scotland) Act 1984; Crofters (Scotland) Act 1993; Scottish Land Court Act 1993; Housing (Scotland) Act 2006; Crofting Reform etc. Act 2007
Relates to	Landlord and Tenant (Ireland) Act 1870; Land Law (Ireland) Act 1881; Representation of the People Act 1884

Status: Amended

Text of statute as originally enacted

Revised text of statute as amended

Text of the Crofters Holdings (Scotland) Act 1886 as in force today (including any amendments) within the United Kingdom, from legislation.gov.uk.

The Crofters Holdings (Scotland) Act 1886 (49 & 50 Vict. c. 29) (Scottish Gaelic: Achd na Croitearachd 1886) is an act of the Parliament of the United Kingdom that created legal definitions of crofting parish and crofter, granted security of land tenure to crofters and produced the first Crofters Commission, a land court which ruled on disputes between landlords and crofters. The same court ruled on whether parishes were or were not crofting parishes. In many respects the act was modelled on the Irish Land Acts, including the Landlord and Tenant (Ireland) Act 1870 (33 & 34 Vict. c. 46) and Land Law (Ireland) Act 1881(44 & 45 Vict. c. 49). By granting the crofters security of tenure, the act put an end to the Highland Clearances.

The act was largely a result of crofters' agitation which had become well organised and very persistent in Skye and of growing support, throughout the Highlands, for the Crofters Party, which had gained five members of parliament in the general election of 1885. Agitation took the form of rent strikes (withholding rent payments) and land raids (occupying land which the landlord had reserved for hunting or sheep).

The act itself did not quell the agitation. In particular it was very weak in terms of enabling the Crofters Commission to resolve disputes about access to land. It was enough however to make much more acceptable, politically, the use of troops in confrontations with agitators.

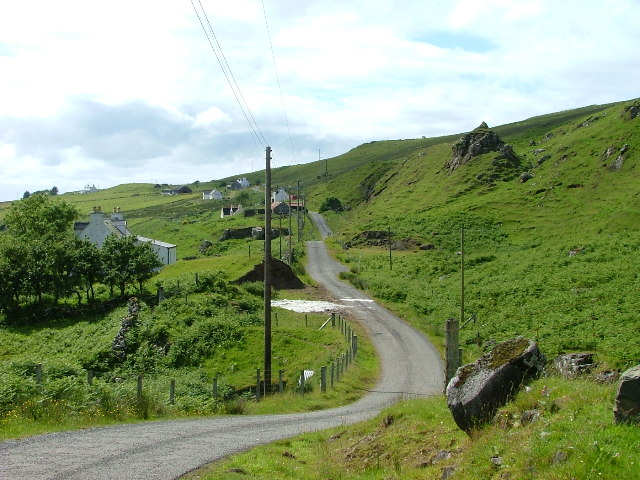
Peighinn Choinnich, crofting town near Ùig in the Isle of Skye

According to John Lorne Campbell, however, the Crofters Holdings (Scotland) Act 1886 was nothing less than "the Magna Carta of the Highlands and Islands, which conferred on the small tenants there something which the peasantry of Scandinavian countries had known for generations, security of tenure and the right to the principle of compensation for their own improvements at the termination of tenancies. Nothing was suggested in the report, or contained in the act, to restrict absentee landlordism or limit the amount of land any one individual might own in Scotland, but for the moment a great advantage has been secured."

The act was not fully effective in increasing the equality of land distribution in Scotland. By the year 2000, two-thirds of Scotland's land area was still owned by only 1,252 landowners out of a population of 5 million.

== Background ==
During the Highland Clearances, the crofters had no rights to the land. Until 1886, it was legal to evict any crofter at the landlord's convenience. The Land Wars commenced in Scotland in 1874 with the successful legal case of the Bernera Riot on the island of Great Bernera in the Outer Hebrides. The crofters wanted recognition of their traditional rights to the land that they had enjoyed under the clan system from the Middle Ages. Through political and economic development the gentry began to take an alternate perspective on their tenantry,

The cultural force of dùthchas [heritage] was pervasive in Gaeldom and was central to the social cohesion of the clan because it articulated the expectations of the masses that the ruling family had the responsibility to act as their protectors and guarantee secure possession of land in return for allegiance, military service, tribute and rental. It was a powerful and enduring belief which lived on long after the military rationale of clanship itself had disappeared and tribal chiefs had shed their ancient responsibilities and become commercial landlords.

Land agitation in Scotland began because of the "Home Rule" movement in Ireland and information and opinions of this movement brought by fishermen to the Outer Hebrides. Believing that they were the rightful owners of the land, crofters used rent strikes and what came to be known as land raids: crofter occupations of land to which crofters believed they should have access to for common grazing or for new crofts but which landlords had given over to sheep farming and hunting parks (called deer forests). The strife grew more intense; the landlords hired warships for protection from the crofters. From time to time there were uprisings and riots.

In the Representation of the People Act 1884 suffrage was extended to men owning land worth at least £10 or paying £10 in rent annually. This included many Highland crofters. The crofters wanted legal rights and the Comunn Gàidhealach Ath-Leasachadh an Fhearainn (Highland Land Law Reform Association) was established in 1885 in London. The Crofters' Party was established and elected five MPs in 1885. Is Treasa Tuath na Tighearna ("The people are stronger than the lord.") was their best-known slogan.

The government feared that the "Home Rule" movement would spread to the Gàidhealtachd (Gaelic-speaking areas in Scotland) from Ireland. The Napier Commission interviewed crofters all over the Gàidhealtachd and made careful study of the crofters' position, publishing its report in 1884. William Gladstone tried to pass a new law granting crofters more rights, but it was voted down in May 1885. Gladstone left his post in 1885 but the other parties created a new government. Gladstone returned to power in January 1886 and the act was finally passed 25 June 1886.

== The act ==
For the first time in Scottish history, the Crofters Holdings (Scotland) Act 1886 affirmed the rights of crofters to their land. It also granted a legal status to crofting towns. The act dealt with the following points especially:

- It gave security of tenure to the crofters, as long as they worked the croft and paid the rent.
- Crofters had the right to pass down their croft to their descendants.
- Crofters had the right to be paid for land improvements, such as erecting fences and drainage
- A standard of reasonable rent was established and required.
- The first Crofters' Commission was established.
- Crofters had the opportunity to reassess the rent with the Crofters' Commission.

The act specified eight counties of Scotland as counties where parishes might be recognised as crofting parishes: Argyll, Caithness, Cromarty, Inverness, Orkney, Ross, Shetland, and Sutherland. Within these counties a crofting parish was a parish where there were year-by-year tenants of land (tenants without leases) who were paying less than £30 a year in rent and who had possessed effective common grazing rights during the 80 years since 24 June 1806.

The Crofters' Commission also was in charge of establishing fair rent and reevaluating rents every seven years. If crofters believed that the rent was too high they had the opportunity to go to the commission. Quite often the rents were lowered or even removed, if the crofters had already been paying too much. The commission had the power to reform the act and establish other aActs, as well as grant green land to crofters in order to enlarge small crofts.

== Results ==
There were different opinions about the act. On the one hand crofters complained that the act did not go far enough, because they were not granted automatic right to fertile land for expansion of their small crofts. Worse, the act did not delineate the position of cotters, who had never had land. After a while, they saw that the commission was willing to protect their rights, especially with regard to rent security. Unfortunately, the commission was underfunded and there was not enough land to distribute to crofters. The act did not resolve the greatest complaint of the crofters, that the land should be returned to them. There was no resolution of the issue where landlords and crofters wanted the same piece of land.

On the other hand, the landlords said that there was "communism looming in the future" and The Scotsman wrote that the act was a "great infringement on the rights of private property.'"

The act did not end the land agitation, because Arthur Balfour believed that the act gave moral authority to the authorities to quell every uprising to reestablish "law and order." For this reason, warships were sent to the Isle of Skye and Tiree.

In the years after the act, Comunn Gàidhealach Ath-Leasachadh an Fhearainn (now called Dionnasg an Fhearainn, "the Land League") and the Crofters' Party the political influence that they had had, because they could not agree on the issue of land and how far to follow the "Home Rule" movement in Ireland on the issue of land ownership.

This opinion was raised again in the Crofting Reform (Scotland) Act 1976 in which crofters gained the legal right to purchase their land for fifteen years' rent. However, by owning their own land, crofters lost the right to CCAGS (Crofting Counties Agricultural Grant Scheme). In the Land Reform (Scotland) Act 2003 the right of purchase was given to community organizations even against the will of landowners, to advance social and economic development. The Crofting Reform (Scotland) Act 2010 granted equality between tenants and landowners, especially with regard to grants and obligations and clarified the details of residency requirements. Now, tenants or owners must live within 32 km (20 miles) of the croft. Crofts not in use may be granted to new tenants.

Looking back in history, Hunter believes that the act established an old-fashioned order, with a place for the tenantry quite different than as in Ireland where crofters could buy their land under "Home Rule" acts. The act was neither effective in the development of crofting communities nor did it encompass the political and social beliefs of those communities. But according to Wightman, the act paved the road to further land development in Scotland, although it did not affect areas outside the Gàidhealtachd. Wightman also stated that the "land question" has yet to be resolved, as two-thirds of Scotland's land area is still owned by only 1,252 landowners out of a population of 5 million.

== Primary legislation since 1886 ==
There has been a steady flow of primary legislation on crofting, including:

- Crofters Holdings (Scotland) Act 1886
- Crofters Holding (Scotland) Act 1887
- Crofters Commission (Delegation of Powers) Act 1888
- Crofters Common Grazings Regulation Act 1891
- Small Landholders (Scotland) Act 1911
- Crofters (Scotland) Act 1955
- Crofters (Scotland) Act 1961
- Crofting Reform (Scotland) Act 1976
- Crofters (Scotland) Act 1993
- Transfer of Crofting Estates (Scotland) Act 1997
- Crofting Reform etc. Act 2007
- Crofting Reform (Scotland) Act 2010
- Crofting (Amendment) (Scotland) Act 2013

This is summarised in David Findlay's Blog for the Law Society of Scotland.

== See also ==
- Crofting
- Highland Clearances
- Highland and Island Emigration Society
- Highland Potato Famine
- History of Scotland § Rural life
