= Lands Tribunal for Northern Ireland =

The Lands Tribunal for Northern Ireland is a court of record in Northern Ireland established by the Lands Tribunal and Compensation Act (Northern Ireland) 1964. The tribunal's role is to resolve disputes about land and building values, and there use.
