= History of agriculture in Scotland =

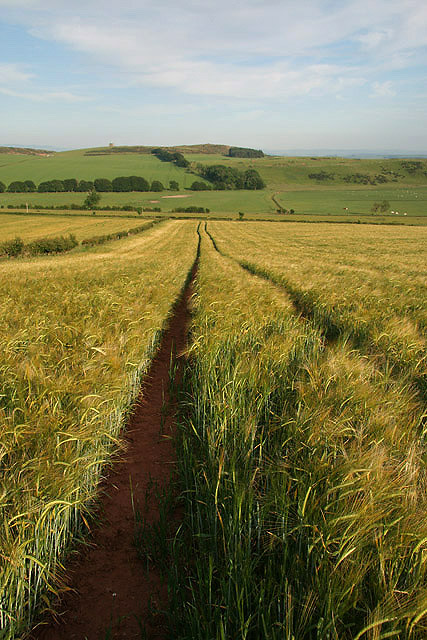
A barley field at Brotherstone Hill South in the Scottish Borders

The history of agriculture in Scotland includes all forms of farm production in the modern boundaries of Scotland, from the prehistoric era to the present day.

Scotland's good arable and pastoral land is found mostly in the south and east of the country. Heavy rainfall, wind and salt spray, in combination with thin soil and overgrazing, made most of the western islands treeless. The terrain often made internal land communication difficult, encouraging a coastal network. In the Neolithic period, from around 6,000 years ago, there is evidence of permanent settlements and farming. The two main sources of food were grain and cow milk. From the Bronze Age, arable land spread at the expense of forest. From the Iron Age, there were hill forts in southern Scotland associated with cultivation ridges and terraces and the fertile plains were already densely exploited for agriculture. During the period of Roman occupation of Britain there was re-growth of trees indicating a reduction in agriculture.

The early Middle Ages were a period of climate deterioration, resulting in more land becoming unproductive. Self-sufficient farms were based around a single homestead or a small cluster of homes. Oats and barley were grown more than other grains, and cattle were the most important domesticated animal. From c. 1150 to 1300, warm dry summers and less severe winters allowed cultivation at greater heights and made land more productive. The system of infield and outfield agriculture may have been introduced with feudalism from the twelfth century. By the late Medieval period, most farming was based on the Lowland fermtoun or Highland baile. These were settlements of a handful of families that jointly farmed an area notionally suitable for two or three plough teams, organised in run rigs. Most ploughing was done with a heavy wooden plough with an iron coulter, pulled by oxen. The rural economy boomed in the thirteenth century and in the immediate aftermath of the Black Death was still buoyant, but by the 1360s there was a severe falling off in incomes to be followed by a slow recovery in the fifteenth century.

As feudal distinctions declined in the early modern era, the major landholding orders, or heritors, were the lairds and yeomen. Others with property rights included husbandmen and free tenants. Many young people left home to become domestic and agricultural servants. The early modern era also saw the impact of the Little Ice Age, necessitating the shipping of large quantities of grain from the Baltic. Under the Commonwealth, the country was relatively highly taxed, but gained access to English markets. After the Restoration customs duties with England were re-established. Economic conditions were generally favourable, as landowners promoted better tillage and cattle-raising. The closing decade of the seventeenth century saw a slump, followed the failed harvests of the "seven ill years", but these shortages would be the last of their kind. After the Union of 1707 there was a conscious attempt to improve agriculture among the gentry and nobility. Enclosure displaced the run rig system and free pasture. The resulting Lowland Clearances saw hundreds of thousands of cottars and tenant farmers from central and southern Scotland forcibly removed. The later Highland Clearances saw the displacement of much of the population of the Highlands as lands were enclosed for sheep farming. Those that remained many were now crofters, living on very small, rented farms with indefinite tenure, dependent on kelping, fishing, spinning of linen and military service. Scotland suffered its last major subsistence crisis when the potato blight reached the Highlands in 1846.

In the twentieth century Scottish agriculture became susceptible to world markets. There were dramatic price rises in the First World War, but a slump in the 1920s and 1930s, followed by more rises in the Second World War. In 1947 annual price reviews were introduced in an attempt to stabilise the market. There was a drive in UK agriculture to greater production until the late 1970s, resulting in intensive farming and increasing mechanisation. The UK joined the European Economic Community in 1972. Some sectors became viable only with subsidies. A series of reforms to the Common Agricultural Policy from the 1990s attempted to control over-production, limit incentives for intensive farming and mitigate environmental damage. A dual farm structure emerged with large commercial farms and small pluralised and diversified holdings.

== Geography and climate ==
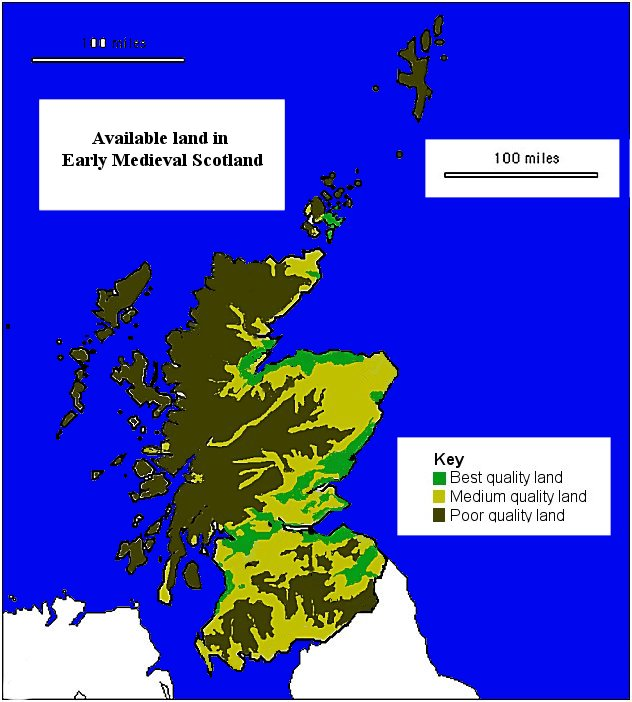
Map of available land in early medieval Scotland.

Scotland is roughly half the size by area of England and Wales, but has approximately the same amount of coastline. It has only between a fifth and a sixth of the amount of the arable or good pastoral land (under 60 metres (200 ft) above sea level), most of which is located in the south and east. This made marginal pastoral farming and fishing the key factors in the pre-modern economy. Its east Atlantic position causes very heavy rainfall: at the end of the twentieth century about 700 centimetres (280 in) per year in the east and over 1,000 centimetres (390 in) in the west. This encouraged the spread of blanket peat bog, the acidity of which, combined with high levels of wind and salt spray, made most of the western islands treeless. The existence of hills, mountains, quicksands and marshes made agriculture and internal communication difficult.

== Prehistory ==
At times during the last interglacial period (130,000–70,000 BCE) Europe had a climate warmer than it is today, and early humans may have made their way to Scotland, though archaeologists have found no traces of this. Glaciers then scoured their way across most of Britain, and only after the ice retreated did Scotland again become habitable, around 9600 BCE. Mesolithic hunter-gatherer encampments formed the first known settlements, and archaeologists have dated an encampment near Biggar to around 8500 BCE. Numerous other sites found around Scotland build up a picture of highly mobile boat-using people making tools from bone, stone and antlers. The oldest house for which there is evidence in Britain is the oval structure of wooden posts found at South Queensferry near the Firth of Forth, dating from the Mesolithic period, about 8240 BCE.

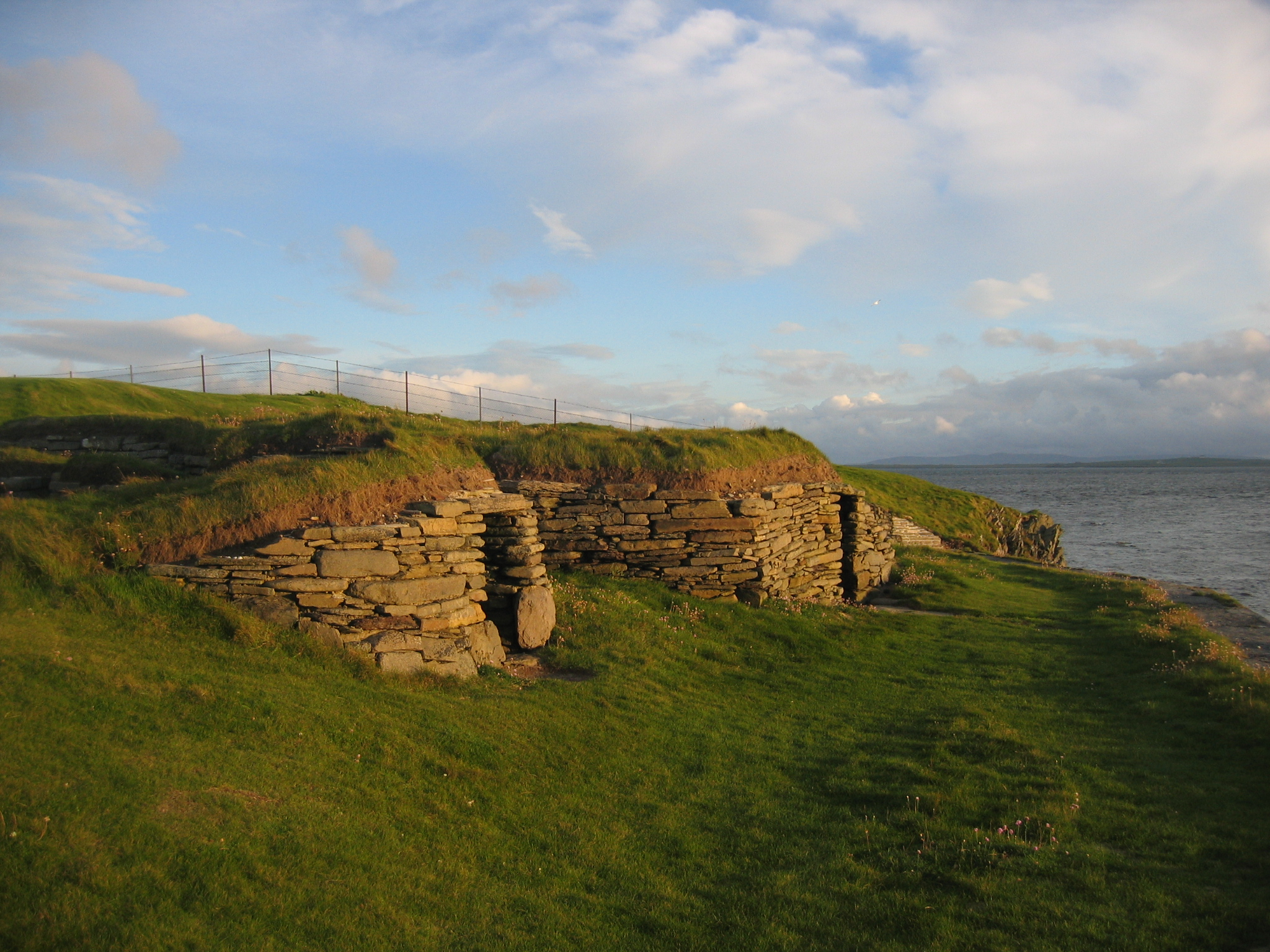
The houses at Knap of Howar, demonstrating the beginning of settled agriculture in Scotland

In the Neolithic period, from around 6,000 years ago, there is evidence of permanent settlements and farming. This includes the well-preserved stone house at Knap of Howar on Papa Westray, dating from around 3800 BCE and the village of similar houses at Skara Brae on West Mainland, Orkney from about 500 years later. Evidence of prehistoric farming includes small plots of improved land, with simple stone boundaries. In Shetland these have been found under peat and on the mainland they are associated with cairnfields (piles of rocks that have been cleared from fields). Archaeological evidence of pollen, pottery, settlements and human remains indicates that the two main sources of food were grain and cow milk, in a pattern that probably remained constant until the High Middle Ages. There is also some limited evidence of the cultivation of flax from this period.

From the beginning of the Bronze Age, about 2000 BCE, extensive analyses of Black Loch in Fife indicate that arable land spread at the expense of forest. From the Iron Age, beginning in the seventh century BCE, as elsewhere in Europe, hill forts were first introduced. Some of these forts in southern Scotland are associated with cultivation ridges and terraces. Over 400 souterrains, small underground constructions, have been discovered in Scotland, many of them in the south-east, and although few have been dated, those that have suggest a construction date in the second or third centuries CE. They are usually found close to settlements (whose timber frames are much less well-preserved) and may have been for storing perishable agricultural products. Aerial photography reveals extensive prehistoric field systems that underlie existing boundaries in some Lowland areas, suggesting that the fertile plains were already densely exploited for agriculture. During the period of Roman occupation of what is now northern England, and occasional advances into Southern Scotland, there was re-growth of birch, oak and hazel for five centuries, suggesting that the Roman invasions had a negative impact on the native population and the extent of agriculture.

== Middle Ages ==
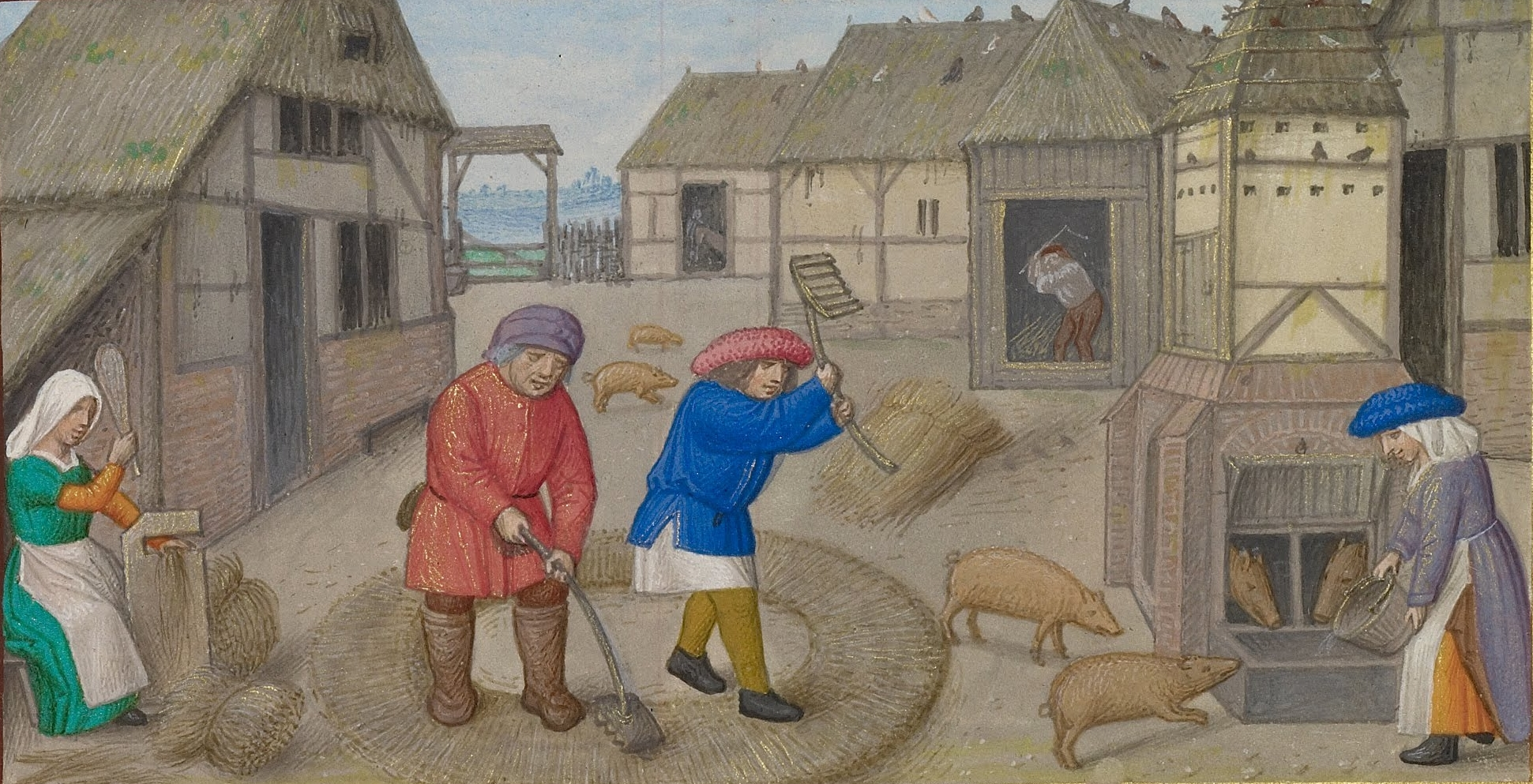
Threshing and pig feeding from a book of hours from the Workshop of the Master of James IV of Scotland (Flemish, c. 1541)

The early Middle Ages were a period of climate deterioration, with a drop in temperature and an increase in rainfall, resulting in more land becoming unproductive. With a lack of significant transport links and wider markets, most farms had to produce a self-sufficient diet of meat, dairy products and cereals, supplemented by hunter-gathering. Limited archaeological evidence indicates that throughout Northern Britain farming was based around a single homestead or a small cluster of three or four homes, each probably containing a nuclear family, with kinship relationships likely to be common among neighbouring houses and settlements, reflecting the partition of land through inheritance. The climate was more favourable for oats and barley than for corn. The evidence of bones indicates that cattle were by far the most important domesticated animal, followed by pigs, sheep and goats, while domesticated fowl were very rare.

In the period c. 1150 to 1300, the warm dry summers and less severe winters of the Medieval Warm Period allowed cultivation at much greater heights above sea level and made land more productive. Arable farming grew significantly, but was still more common in low-lying areas than in high-lying areas such as the Highlands, Galloway and the Southern Uplands. The feudalism introduced under David I, particularly in the east and south where the crown's authority was greatest, saw the placement of lordships. Land was now held from the king, or a superior lord, in exchange for loyalty and forms of service that were usually military. Barons, who held feudal tenures, had the right to hold baronial courts, which could deal with matters of land ownership. However, the imposition of feudalism continued to sit beside existing systems of landholding and tenure and it is not clear how this change impacted on the lives of the ordinary free and unfree workers. In places, feudalism may have tied workers more closely to the land. The predominantly pastoral nature of Scottish agriculture may have made the imposition of a manorial system, based on the English model, impracticable in some areas. Obligations appear to have been limited to occasional labour service, seasonal renders of food, hospitality and money rents.

The system of infield and outfield agriculture, a variation of open field farming widely used across Europe, may have been introduced with feudalism and would continue until the eighteenth century. This expanded from the use of small enclosed fields, which continued from the prehistoric era. The infield was the best land, close to housing. It was farmed continuously and most intensively, receiving most of the manure. Crops were usually bere (a form of barley), oats and sometimes wheat, rye and legumes. The more extensive outfield was used largely for oats. It was fertilised from the overnight folding of cattle in the summer and was often left fallow to recover its fertility. In fertile regions the infield could be extensive, but in the uplands it might be small, surrounded by large amounts of outfield. In coastal areas fertiliser included seaweed and around the major burghs urban refuse was used. Yields were fairly low, often around three times the quantity of seed sown, although they could reach twice that yield on some infields. The main unit of land measurement in Scotland was the davoch (i.e. "vat"), called the arachor in Lennox. This unit is also known as the "Scottish ploughgate". In English-speaking Lothian, it was simply ploughgate. It may have measured about 104 acres (42 ha), divided into four raths.

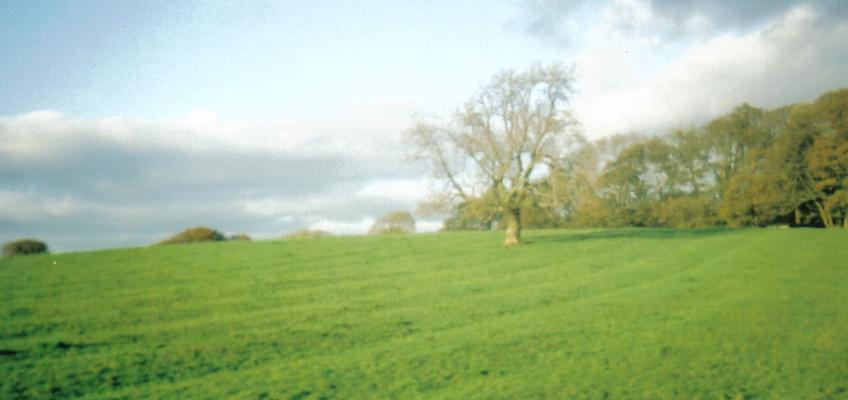
Rig and furrow marks at Buchans Field, Wester Kittochside

By the late Medieval period, most farming was based on the Lowland fermtoun or Highland baile, settlements of a handful of families that jointly farmed an area notionally suitable for two or three plough teams, allocated in run rigs to tenant farmers, known as husbandmen. The average amount of land used by a husbandman in Scotland might have been 26 acres (11 ha). Below the husbandmen, lesser landholders and free tenants were the cottars, who often shared rights to common pasture, occupied small portions of land and participated in joint farming as hired labour. Farms also might have grassmen, who had rights only to grazing.

Run rigs, of a furrow and ridge, usually ran downhill so that they included both wet and dry land, helping to offset some of the problems of extreme weather conditions. Most ploughing was done with a heavy wooden plough with an iron coulter, pulled by oxen, which were more effective on heavy soils and cheaper to feed than horses. Obligations to the local lord usually included supplying oxen for ploughing the lord's land on an annual basis and the much resented obligation to grind corn at the lord's mill. Key crops included kale (for both humans and animals), and hemp and flax for cloth production. Sheep and goats were probably the main sources of milk, while cattle were raised primarily for meat. The rural economy appears to have boomed in the thirteenth century and in the immediate aftermath of the Black Death, probably the bubonic plague, which reached Scotland in 1349 and killed perhaps over a third of the population, was still buoyant, but by the 1360s there was a severe falling off in incomes that can be seen in clerical benefices, of between a third and half compared with the beginning of the era, to be followed by a slow recovery in the fifteenth century. Towards the end of the period average temperatures began to reduce again, with cooler and wetter conditions limiting the extent of arable agriculture, particularly in the Highlands.

== Early modern era ==
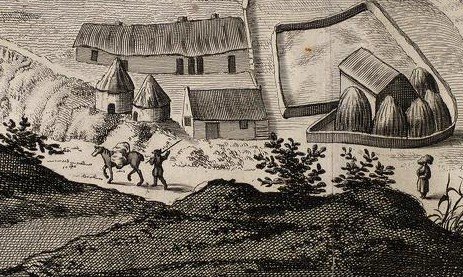
A Scottish Lowland farm from John Slezer's Prospect of Dunfermline, published in the Theatrum Scotiae, 1693

While barons held increasingly nominal feudal tenures local tenants-in-chief, who legally held their land directly from the king and who by the sixteenth century were often the major local landholders in an area, grew in significance. As feudal distinctions declined, the barons and tenants-in-chief merged to form a new identifiable group, the lairds, roughly equivalent to the English gentlemen. Below the lairds were a variety of groups, often ill-defined. These included yeomen, later characterised by Walter Scott as "bonnet lairds", often owning substantial land. The practice of feuing (by which a tenant paid an entry sum and an annual feu duty, but could pass the land on to their heirs) meant that the number of people holding heritable possession of lands, which had previously been controlled by the church or nobility, expanded. These and the lairds probably numbered about 10,000 by the seventeenth century and became what the government defined as heritors, on whom the financial and legal burdens of local government increasingly fell. Below the substantial landholders were those engaged in subsistence agriculture, who made up the majority of the working population. Those with property rights included husbandmen, lesser landholders and free tenants. By the early modern era in Lowland rural society, as in England, many young people, both male and female, left home to become domestic and agricultural servants. Women acted as an important part of the workforce. Many unmarried women worked away from their families as farm servants and married women worked with their husbands around the farm, taking part in all the major agricultural tasks. They had a particular role as shearers in the harvest, forming most of the reaping team of the bandwin.

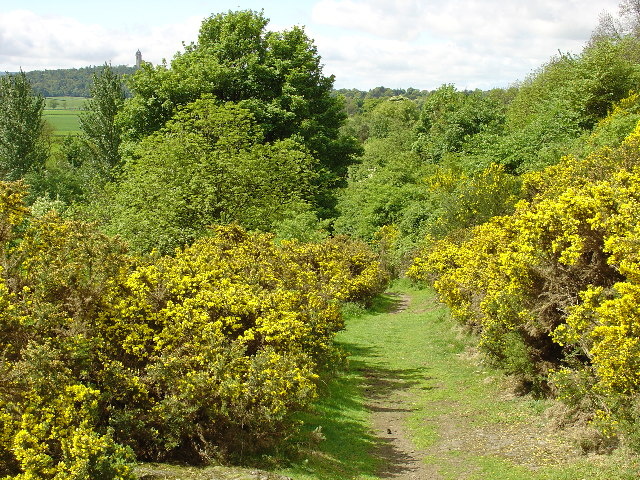
A section of drover's road at Cotkerse near Blairlogie, Scotland

The early modern era also saw the impact of the Little Ice Age, of colder and wetter weather, which peaked towards the end of the seventeenth century. Almost half the years in the second half of the sixteenth century saw local or national scarcity, necessitating the shipping of large quantities of grain from the Baltic, referred to as Scotland's "emergency granary". This was particularly from Poland through the port of Danzig, but later Königsberg and Riga, shipping Russian grain, and Swedish ports, would become important. The trade was so important that Scottish colonies were established in these ports. In the early seventeenth century famine was relatively common, with four periods of famine prices between 1620 and 1625. The English invasions of the 1640s had a profound impact on the Scottish economy, with the destruction of crops and the disruption of markets resulting in some of the most rapid price rises of the century. Under the Commonwealth, the country was relatively highly taxed, but gained access to English markets. After the Restoration the formal frontier with England was re-established, along with its customs duties. Economic conditions were generally favourable from 1660 to 1688, as land owners promoted better tillage and cattle-raising. By the end of the century the drovers roads, stretching down from the Highlands through south-west Scotland to north-east England, had become firmly established as routes for Highland cattle to reach English markets. The closing decade of the seventeenth century saw the generally favourable economic conditions that had dominated since the Restoration come to an end. There was a slump in trade with the Baltic and France from 1689 to 1691, caused by French protectionism and changes in the Scottish cattle trade, followed by four years of failed harvests (1695, 1696 and 1698–99), known as the "seven ill years". The result was severe famine and depopulation, particularly in the north. The famines of the 1690s were seen as particularly severe, partly because famine had become relatively rare in the second half of the seventeenth century, with only one year of dearth (in 1674) and the shortages of the 1690s would be the last of their kind.

== Eighteenth century ==
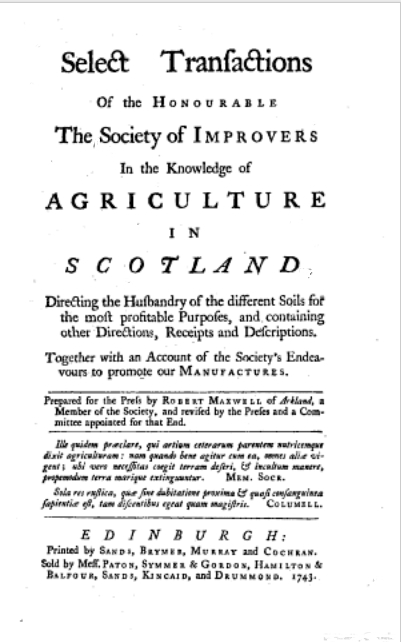
Frontispiece from Transactions of the Society of Improvers (1743)

Increasing contacts with England after the Union of 1707 led to a conscious attempt to improve agriculture among the gentry and nobility. The Society of Improvers was founded in 1723, including in its 300 members dukes, earls, lairds and landlords. Haymaking was introduced along with the English plough and foreign grasses, the sowing of rye grass and clover. Turnips and cabbages were introduced, lime was put down to combat soil acidity, marshes were drained, roads built and woods planted. Drilling and sowing and crop rotation were introduced. The introduction of the potato to Scotland in 1739 greatly improved the diet of the peasantry. Enclosures began to displace the run rig system and free pasture, creating the landscape of largely rectangular fields that characterises the Lowlands today. New farm buildings, often based on designs in patterns books, replaced the fermtoun and regional diversity was replaced with a standardisation of building forms. Smaller farms retained the linear outline of the longhouse, with dwelling house, barn and byre in a row, but in larger farms a three- or four-sided layout became common, separating the dwelling house from barns and servants quarters.

Early improvement was carried out with the traditional tools, but new technology was increasingly important. Lighter ploughs were adopted, including from 1763 James Small's cast iron and curved mould board. It was first adopted in the south-east and spread to rest of the country in the 1770s. From 1788 Andrew Meikle's automated threshing mill speeded up a vital part of the harvesting process. There was increasing regional specialisation. The Lothians became a major centre of grain, Ayrshire of cattle breading and the Borders of sheep.

The result of these changes were the Lowland Clearances, by which hundreds of thousands of cottars and tenant farmers from central and southern Scotland were forcibly moved from the farms and small holdings their families had occupied for hundreds of years. Many small settlements were dismantled, their occupants forced either to the new purpose-built villages built by the landowners such as John Cockburn of Ormiston to house the displaced cottars on the outskirts of the new ranch-style farms, or to the new industrial centres of Glasgow, Edinburgh, or northern England. Tens of thousands of others emigrated to Canada or the United States, finding opportunities there to own and farm their own land.

== Nineteenth century ==
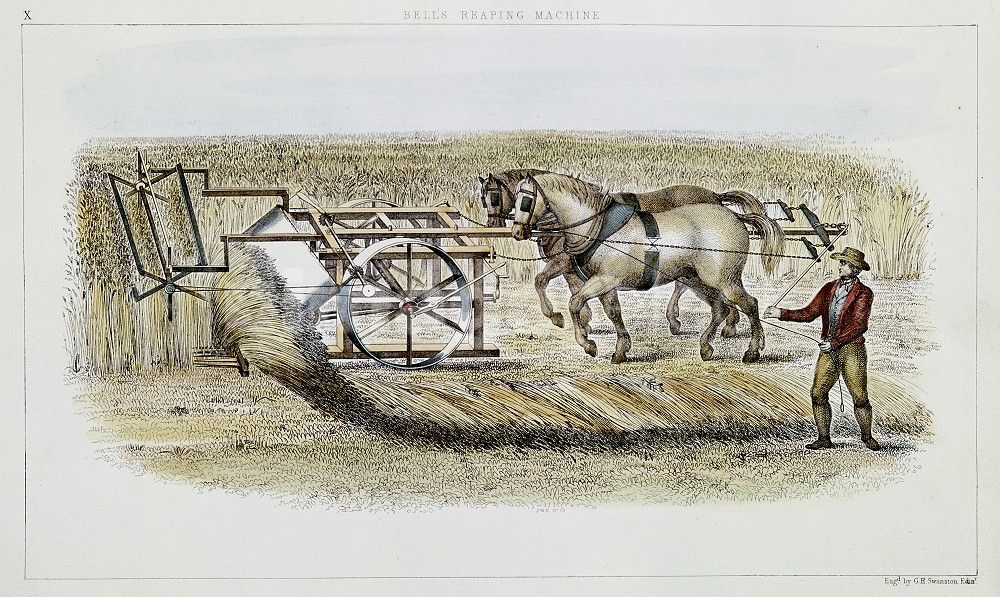
An 1851 illustration showing the reaping machine developed by Patrick Bell

Improvement continued in the nineteenth century. Innovations included the first working reaping machine, developed by Patrick Bell in 1828. His rival James Smith turned to improving sub-soil drainage and developed a method of ploughing that could break up the subsoil barrier without disturbing the topsoil. Previously unworkable low-lying carselands could now be brought into arable production and the result was the even Lowland landscape that still predominates.

While the Lowlands had seen widespread agricultural improvement, the Highlands remained very poor and traditional. A handful of powerful families, typified by the dukes of Argyll, Atholl, Buccleuch, and Sutherland, owned enormous sections of Scotland and had extensive influence on political affairs (certainly up to 1885). As late as 1878, 68 families owned nearly half the land in Scotland. Particularly after the end of the boom created by the Revolutionary and Napoleonic Wars (1790–1815), these landlords needed cash to maintain their position in London society. They turned to money rents and downplayed the traditional patriarchal relationship that had historically sustained the clans.

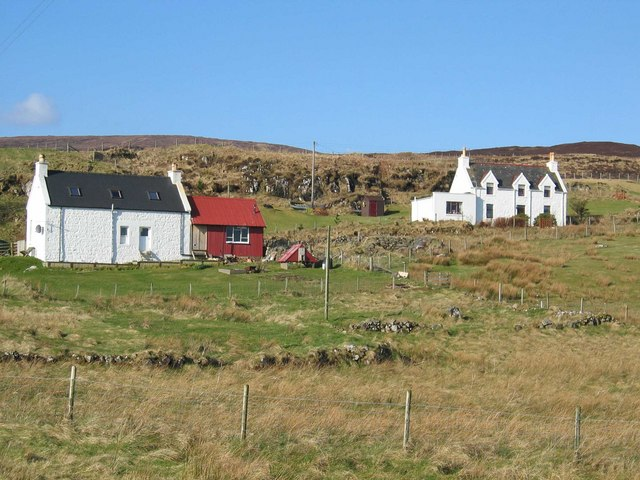
Crofts at Borreraig on the island of Skye

One result of these changes were the Highland Clearances, by which much of the population of the Highlands were evicted as lands were enclosed, principally so that they could be used for sheep farming. The clearances followed patterns of agricultural change throughout the UK. The result was a continuous exodus from the land—to the cities, or further afield to England, Canada, America or Australia. Many that remained were now crofters, living on very small rented farms with indefinite tenure used to raise various crops and animals. For these families kelping, fishing, spinning of linen and military service became important sources of additional revenue. Scotland suffered its last major subsistence crisis, when the potato blight that caused the Great Famine of Ireland reached the Highlands in 1846. Some 150,000 people whose food supply was mainly potatoes faced disaster. They were rescued by an effective emergency relief system that stands in contrast to the failures of relief in Ireland, but the danger of starvation remained into the 1850s.

The unequal concentration of land ownership remained an emotional subject and was violently challenged in the 1880s through the Highland Land League. After the report of the Napier Commission of 1883, the government stepped in, passing the Crofters' Holdings (Scotland) Act, 1886 to reduce rents, guarantee fixity of tenure, and break up large estates to provide crofts for the homeless. Explicit security was given for the Scottish smallholders; the legal right to bequeath tenancies to descendants and a Crofting Commission was created in 1886.

== Twentieth century to the present ==
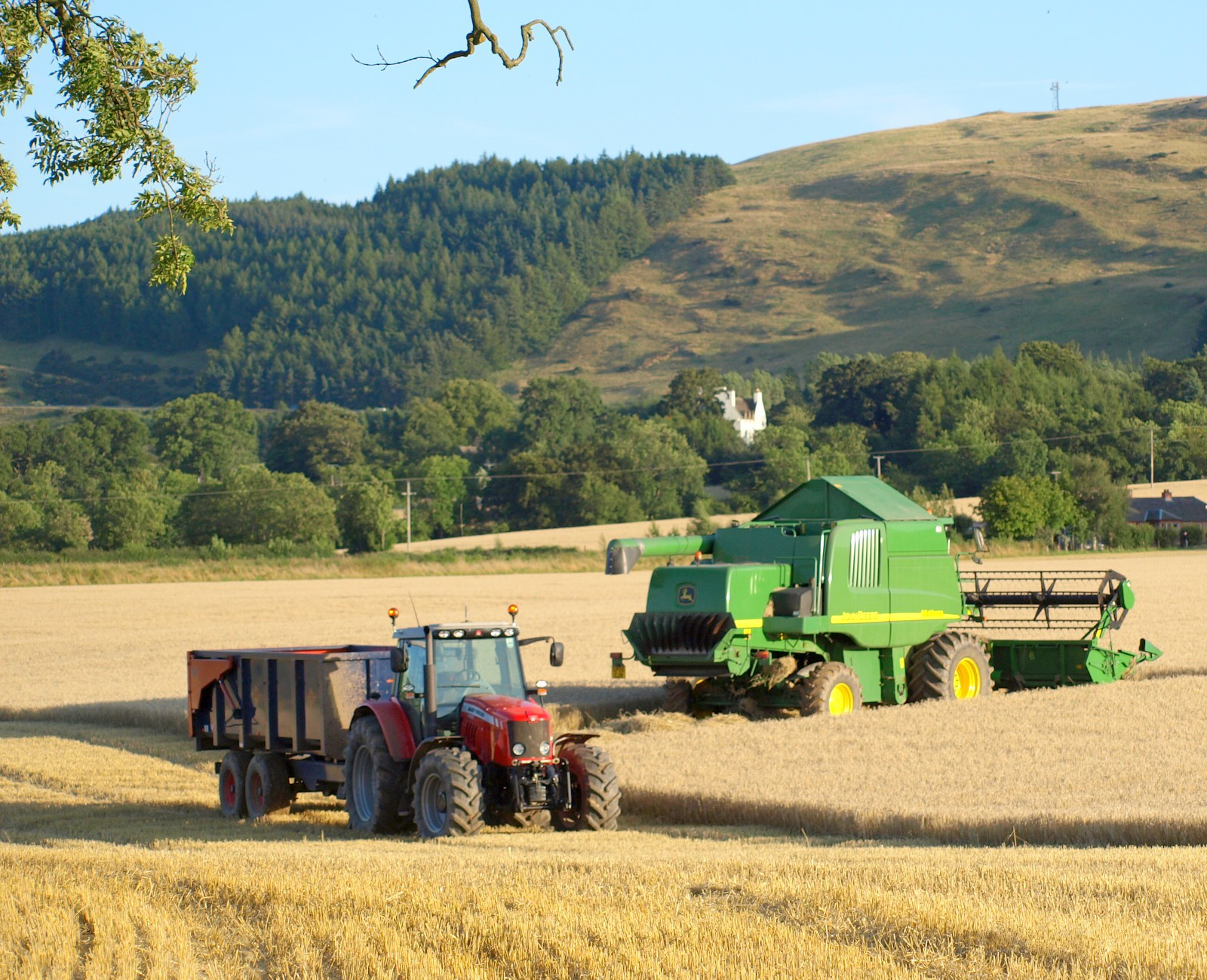
Grain harvest, Bridge of Earn, Perthshire

In the twentieth century Scottish agriculture became susceptible to the ups and downs of world markets. There were dramatic price rises in the First World War, but a slump in the 1920s and 1930s, in which perhaps 40 per cent of Scottish land changed hands, followed by more price rises in the Second World War. In 1947 annual price reviews were introduced in an attempt to stabilise the market. A series of Acts of Parliament followed, designed to give price support and grants to farmers. After the Second World War and the associated rationing, there was a drive in UK agriculture to greater production. This lasted until the late 1970s, resulting in more intensive farming. More areas of marginal land were brought into production with government subsidies. At the same time, the amount of forest was increased by a factor of three. There was increasing mechanisation of Scottish agriculture. The horse was replaced by the tractor and the combine harvester. This meant that farming became less labour-intensive. In 1951, 88,000 people worked in Scottish agriculture full-time, but by 1991 it had fallen to about 25,000, leading to more depopulation of rural areas. This helped make Scottish agriculture among the most efficient in Europe.

In the 1960s and 1970s, 76–77 per cent of output by value was livestock farming and, although this has fallen to about 64 per cent since 1990, arable farming remains a minority of the sector and two-thirds of agricultural land is rough pasture. One result is that chemicalisation and arable-based subsidies have had less impact on Scottish biodiversity than is the case in England where farming is overwhelmingly arable. The UK membership of the European Economic Community (later the European Union) in 1972 began a re-orientation for Scottish farming. A preference for Commonwealth markets was replaced by EU obligations. Agriculture became dominated by the Common Agricultural Policy (CAP) of the EU, which made farming dependent on market support and direct grants to farmers. As a result, some sectors, particularly hill sheep farming, became viable only with subsidies. Eight-four per cent of Scottish land qualified for extra support as a Less Favoured Area (LFA), but 80 per cent of the payments were going to only 20 per cent of the farmers, mainly large commercial arable farms in the Lowlands. A series of reforms to the CAP from the 1990s attempted to control over-production, limit incentives for intensive farming and mitigate environmental damage. As part of an attempt to mitigate the depopulation and commercialisation of Scottish farming, the Crofting Act of 1976 made it easier for crofters to buy their farms, but most were insufficient to support a family, and many small farmers turned to fish farming and tourism to supplement their incomes. A dual farm structure has emerged with agriculture divided between large commercial farms and small pluralised and diversified holdings. Scotland has the highest average farm size in the European Union, almost ten times the average.

== See also ==
Crofting
