= List of cultural, intellectual, philosophical and technological revolutions =

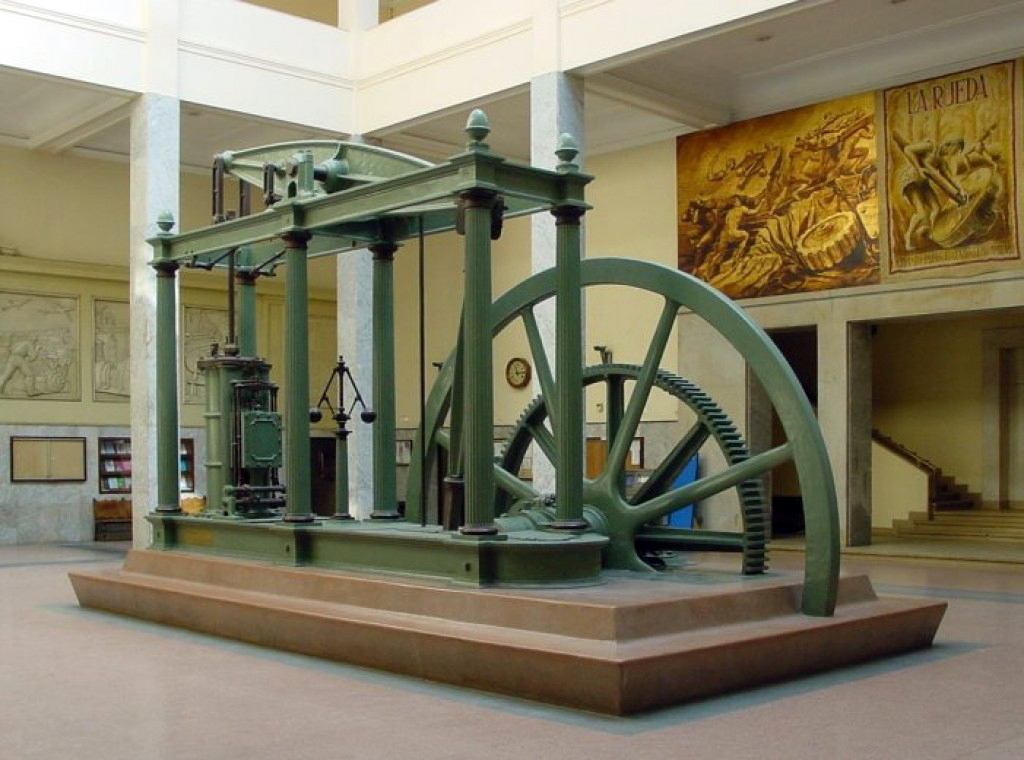
A Watt steam engine in Madrid. The development of the steam engine propelled the Industrial Revolution in Britain and the world. The steam engine was created to pump water from coal mines, enabling them to be deepened beyond groundwater levels.

The term revolution is used to denote trends which have resulted in great social changes outside the political sphere, such as changes in mores, culture, philosophy or technology. Many have been global, while others have been limited to single countries. Such revolutions include:

- The Agricultural Revolutions, which include:
  - The Neolithic Revolution (perhaps 13000 years ago), which formed the basis for human civilization to develop. It is commonly referred to as the 'First Agricultural Revolution'.
  - The British Agricultural Revolution (17th century), which spurred urbanization and consequently helped launch the Industrial Revolution.
  - The Scottish Agricultural Revolution (18th century), which led to the Lowland Clearances.
  - The Green Revolution (1945–present): The use of industrial fertilizers and new crops greatly increased the world's agricultural output. It is commonly referred to as the 'Third Agricultural Revolution'.
- The Industrial Revolutions:
  - The Industrial Revolution: The major shift of technological, socioeconomic and cultural conditions in the late 18th century and early 19th century that began in Britain and spread throughout the world.
  - The Second Industrial Revolution (1871–1914): A continuation of the First Industrial Revolution marked by technologies such as the telegraph, railroads, and gasoline-powered machines.
  - The Digital Revolution: The sweeping changes brought about by computing and communication technology, starting from circa 1950 with the creation of the first general-purpose electronic computers. Also referred to as the Third Industrial Revolution.
  - The Fourth Industrial Revolution: A neologism for the rapid advancement of technology in the 21st century, including the advancement of artificial intelligence, gene editing, advanced robotics, and metaverse technology.
- Several international cultural and/or socioeconomic movements:
  - The Upper Paleolithic Revolution: The emergence of "high culture", new technologies and regionally distinct cultures.
  - The Price revolution: A series of economic events from the second half of the 15th century to the first half of the 17th, the price revolution refers most specifically to the high rate of inflation that characterized the period across Western Europe.
  - The Commercial Revolution: A period of European economic expansion, colonialism, and mercantilism which lasted from approximately the 16th century until the early 18th century.
  - The Counterculture of the 1960s (approximately 1960–1973) was a social revolution that originated in the United States and United Kingdom, and eventually spread to other western nations. The themes of this movement included the anti-war movement, civil rights for African-Americans, rebellion against conservative norms, drug use, and the sexual revolution (see below).
    - The Sexual revolution: A change in sexual morality and sexual behavior throughout the Western world, mainly during the 1960s and 1970s.
  - The Chinese Cultural Revolution: A struggle for power within the Chinese Communist Party, which grew to include large sections of Chinese society and eventually brought the People's Republic of China to the brink of civil war, and which lasted from 1966 to 1976.
  - The Iranian Cultural Revolution: A struggle for power within Iran after the return to Tehran February 1, 1979 of Ayatollah Khomeini after a 15-year exile, who was declared ruler for life in December of the same year, and which lasted from 1979 to 1989.
  - The Quiet Revolution: A period of rapid change in Quebec, Canada, in the 1960s. This leads to the separatist movement for Quebec sovereignty and two referendums.
- The Scientific Revolution: A fundamental transformation in scientific ideas around the 16th century.

== See also ==
- List of revolutions
- Technological revolution
