= Greystone, Angus =

Coordinates: 56.578439°N 2.755259°W

Greystone
- Location within Angus
- OS grid reference: NO537432
- Council area: Angus
- Lieutenancy area: Angus
- Country: Scotland
- Sovereign state: United Kingdom
- Post town: ARBROATH
- Postcode district: DD11
- Dialling code: 01241
- Police: Scotland
- Fire: Scottish
- Ambulance: Scottish
- UK Parliament: Dundee East
- Scottish Parliament: Angus North East Scotland

Greystone is a hamlet in Angus, Scotland. It lies between the towns of Carnoustie and Forfar in the parish of Carmyllie.

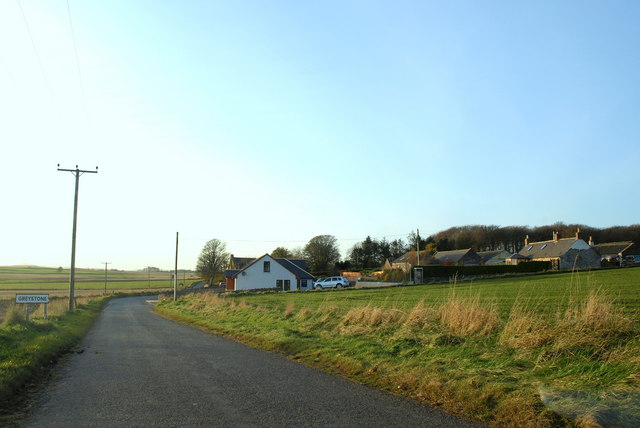
Greystone
