= Carmyllie =

Rural parish in Angus, Scotland

Coordinates: 56.568364°N 2.731575°W

- Location within Angus
- OS grid reference: NO550420
- Council area: Angus
- Lieutenancy area: Angus
- Country: Scotland
- Sovereign state: United Kingdom
- Post town: ARBROATH
- Postcode district: DD11
- Dialling code: 01241
- Police: Scotland
- Fire: Scottish
- Ambulance: Scottish
- UK Parliament: Angus
- Scottish Parliament: Angus South

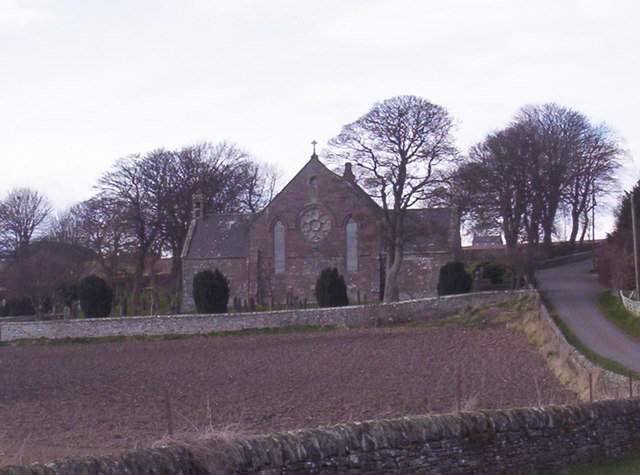
The parish kirk

Carmyllie (Gaelic: Càrn Mhoillidh) is a rural parish in Angus, Scotland. It is situated on high ground between Arbroath, on the coast, and the inland county town of Forfar. The main settlements in the parish are Redford, Greystone, Guynd and Milton of Carmyllie. There is a Church of Scotland church and a primary school. The Elliot Water rises in the west of the parish.

== Economy ==
Carmyllie was formerly known for its stone quarries. For many centuries these produced high quality sandstone that was shipped all over the world. Carmyllie post office was closed in September 2008. Between 1900 and 1965 Carmyllie was linked to Arbroath by the Carmyllie Railway.

== Clan Strachan ==
Carmyllie has a traditional association with Clan Strachan.

== Notable natives and residents ==
- Robert Small 1732 - 1808, Moderator of the General Assembly of the Church of Scotland in 1791
- William Small 1734 - 1775, Professor of Natural Philosophy, William & Mary College, Virginia where he exercised great influence on the young Thomas Jefferson, political thinker.
- Reverend Patrick Bell 1799 - 1869, Church of Scotland Minister and pioneer of the reaping machine.
- James Bowman Lindsay 1799 - 1862, pioneer of the electric light bulb, submarine telegraphy and arc welding.
- Peter Fraser, Lord Fraser of Carmyllie 1945 - 2013, former Lord Advocate for Scotland

== Carmyllie, New Zealand ==
There is also a Carmyllie in the South Island of New Zealand, some 76 km east of Invercargill.

== See also ==
- Carnoustie
- Arbirlot
