= Gruids =

Coordinates: 58.00314°N 4.41685°W

Gruids: Scottish Gaelic: Na Grùidean
- Location within the Sutherland area
- OS grid reference: NC572041
- Council area: Highland
- Lieutenancy area: Sutherland
- Country: Scotland
- Sovereign state: United Kingdom
- Post town: Lairg
- Postcode district: IV27 4
- Police: Scotland
- Fire: Scottish
- Ambulance: Scottish

Gruids (Scottish Gaelic: Na Grùidean) is a small remote hamlet, in the council area of Highland, Scotland.

== Geography ==
The village of Lairg which lies at the base on Loch Shin, is situated less than 2 miles northeast along the A839 road.

== History ==
Gruids Wood to the south shows traces of prehistoric and post-mediaeval settlements. A Conflict or Battle of Gruids was fought around 1520 on ground to the north.

On 15 June 1820, Donald Bannerman who was the local sheriff-officer, accompanied by two colleagues, Alexander Ross and Alexander Mackenzie, attempted to deliver eviction orders at Gruids, on behalf of the landlord, Sir George Munro of Poyntzfield. This was part of the Highland Clearances where tenants were removed to make way for more profitable sheep farming. To get to Gruids they had to take the ferry over Loch Shin. As they approached the other side they received word from the ferryman, John Murray, that the people there were expecting them and they therefore asked him to return them back to the opposite shore, which he declined to do. Having no choice but to disembark, the three men were met by a crowd of about 100 people, mostly women, who were armed with sticks and cudgels. They quickly found and burned the sheriff-officer's documents, stripped him naked, threw him down and bound his hands behind his back. He was allowed to get back into his clothes but was then suspended above flames that were fierce enough to scorch him, first on his back and then on his belly. Along with Ross and Mackenzie, sheriff-officer Bannerman was returned to the shore of Loch Shin. Here, Ross managed to escape and hide in a schoolmaster's house, but the windows were broken, the door unlocked from the inside and he was re-captured. Having been reunited with the other two captives they were set free, but Bannerman still with his hands bound and clothes tied round his neck had to stumble off in the direction of Golspie. Another account states that the sheriff-officer was whipped while held captive, but he later returned accompanied by both the military and the police, and the tenants were cleared.

The future geologist and writer Hugh Miller stayed with an aunt and uncle at Gruids during childhood holidays and observed the geological features.
