= Redford, Angus =

Coordinates: 56.586773°N 2.713093°W

Redford
- Location within Angus
- OS grid reference: NO563441
- Council area: Angus
- Lieutenancy area: Angus
- Country: Scotland
- Sovereign state: United Kingdom
- Post town: ARBROATH
- Postcode district: DD11
- Dialling code: 01241
- Police: Scotland
- Fire: Scottish
- Ambulance: Scottish
- UK Parliament: Angus
- Scottish Parliament: Angus

Redford is a hamlet in the parish of Carmyllie in Angus, Scotland. It is situated on high ground between Arbroath, on the coast, and the inland county town of Forfar. Carmyllie school is located in the settlement, as was the old Carmyllie railway station.

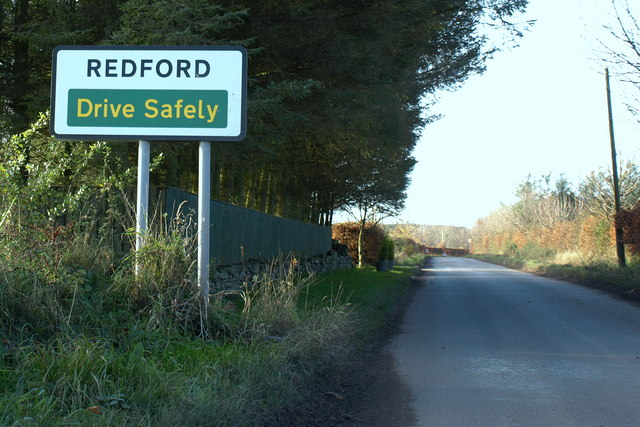
Entering Redford

== See also ==
- Carnoustie
