= Highland Clearances =

Evictions in Scottish Highlands, c. 1750–1860

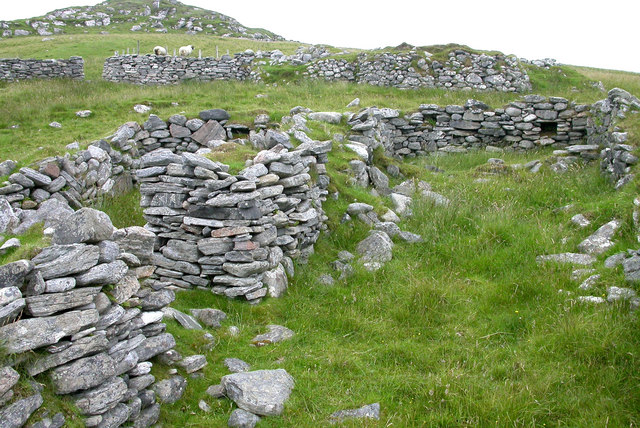
- Ruined croft houses on Fuaigh Mòr in Loch Roag. The island was cleared of its inhabitants in 1841 and is now used only for grazing sheep.
- Date: Mostly 1750 – 1860
- Outcome: Emigration from the Highland region Crofters Holdings (Scotland) Act 1886

The Highland Clearances (Scottish Gaelic: Fuadaichean nan Gàidheal [ˈfuət̪ɪçən nəŋ ˈɡɛː.əl̪ˠ], the "eviction of the Gaels") were the evictions of a significant number of tenants in the Scottish Highlands and Islands, mostly in two phases from 1750 to 1860.

The first phase resulted from agricultural improvement, driven by the desire for landlords to increase their income—many had substantial debts, with actual or potential bankruptcy being a large part of the reason for the clearances. This involved the enclosure of the open fields managed on the run rig system and shared grazing. These were usually replaced with large-scale pastoral farms on which much higher rents were paid. The displaced tenants were expected to be employed in industries such as fishing, quarrying, or kelp harvesting and processing. Their reduction in social status from farmer to crofter was one of the causes of resentment.

The second phase involved overcrowded crofting communities from the first phase that had lost the means to support themselves, through famine or the collapse of industries on which they had relied. "Assisted passages" became common, when landowners paid the fares for their tenants to emigrate. Tenants who were selected for this had, in practical terms, little choice but to emigrate. The Highland Potato Famine struck towards the end of this period, giving greater urgency to the process.

The eviction of tenants went against dùthchas, the principle that clan members had an inalienable right to rent land in the clan territory. This was never recognised in Scottish law. It was gradually abandoned by clan chiefs as they began to think of themselves simply as commercial landlords, rather than as patriarchs of their people—a process that arguably started with the Statutes of Iona of 1609. The clan members continued to rely on dùthchas. This difference in viewpoints was an inevitable source of grievance. The actions of landlords varied. Some did try to delay or limit evictions, often to their financial cost. (Note: Examples of landlords who were reluctant to follow the advice of their advisers on this include the Macdonald estate on Sky in 1802 and then again, with a later Lord Macdonald, in 1829; Lord Breadalbane was criticised by his advisers for "... a mistaken feeling of compassion to the small farmers"; a similar situation existed with the Seaforth estate on Lewis in 1800.) The Countess of Sutherland genuinely believed her plans were advantageous for those resettled in crofting communities and could not understand why tenants complained. However, a few landlords displayed complete lack of concern for evicted tenants. (Note: John Gordon of Cluny is picked out for particular criticism by historian James Hunter.)

== Definition ==
The definition of "clearance" (as it relates to the Highland Clearances) is debatable. The term was not in common use during much of the clearances; landowners, their factors and other estate staff tended, until the 1840s, to use the word "removal" to refer to the eviction of tenants. However, by 1843, "clearance" had become a general (and derogatory) word to describe the activities of Highland landlords. Its use was ambiguous, as for some it meant only the displacement of large numbers of people from a single place at one time. For others, the eviction of a single tenant at the end of a lease could be termed "clearance". Eric Richards suggests that current usage is broad, meaning "any displacement of occupiers (even of sheep) by Highland landlords". He adds that it can apply to both large and small evictions, and includes voluntary or forced removal and instances involving either emigration or resettlement nearby. T. M. Devine also takes the view that "clearance" has a broader meaning now than when it was used in the 19th century.

== Economic and social context ==
=== Agricultural Revolution ===
The first phase of the Highland Clearances was part of the Scottish Agricultural Revolution but happened later than the same process in the Scottish Lowlands. Scottish agriculture in general modernised much more rapidly than in England and, to a large extent, elsewhere in Europe. The growing cities of the Industrial Revolution presented an increased demand for food; (Note: Urbanisation in the first half of the 19th century was faster in Scotland than anywhere else in Britain or Europe.) land came to be seen as an asset to meet this need, and as a source of profit, rather than a means of support for its resident population.

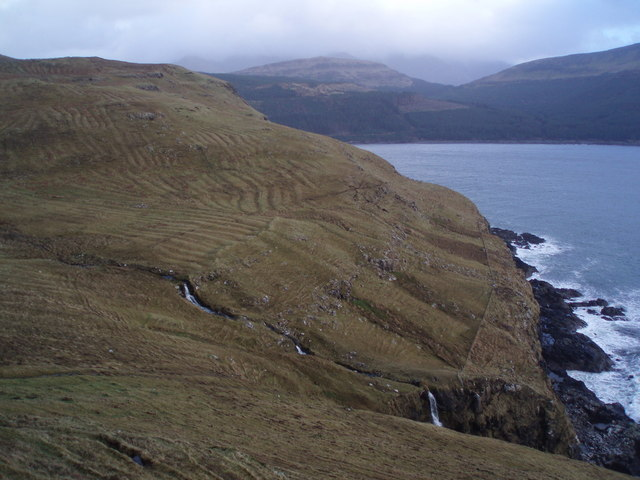
The remains of old run rig strips beside Loch Eynort, Isle of Skye

Before improvement, Highland agriculture was based on run rig arable areas and common land for grazing. Those working in this system lived in townships or bailtean. Under the run rig system, the open fields were divided into equivalent parts and these were allocated, once a year, to each of the occupiers, who then worked their land individually. (Note: In some instances, ploughing was carried out as a communal activity, with the land being divided afterwards. The view of run rig as a communal activity is a common misconception. Communal working only arose out of necessity.) With no individual leases or ownership of plots of land, there was little incentive to improve it (for instance by drainage or crop rotation systems). Nor, with common grazing, could an individual owner improve the quality of his stock. Enclosure of the common lands and the run rig fields was a method of improvement. More commonly, there was a greater change in land use: the replacement of mixed farming (in which cattle provided a cash crop) with large-scale sheep farming. This involved displacement of the population to crofts on the same estate, other land in the Highlands, the industrial cities of Scotland or other countries. The common view is that the shepherds employed to manage these flocks were from outside the Highlands. This is an oversimplification, as Gaelic-speaking tacksmen and drovers were to be found in the sheep trade from the 1780s. When sheep were introduced in the Sutherland Clearances, over half the leases were taken up by Sutherlanders. Still, the Duchess of Sutherland forced 15,000 inhabitants (3000 families) off the land. They were replaced by 131,000 sheep.

=== Clanship ===
Since their origin in the early Middle Ages, clans were the major social unit of the Highlands. They were headed by a clan chief, with members of his family taking positions of authority under him. The mechanisms of clanship gave protection and agricultural land to the clansmen, who in return paid with service and rent which was paid, especially in earlier periods, mostly in kind (as opposed to money). Service included military service when required. The Highlands was one of the parts of Scotland where law and order were not maintained by central government, hence the need for protection from a powerful leader.

Clan leaders controlled the agricultural land, with its distribution generally being achieved through leases to tacksmen, who sublet to the peasant farmers. The basic farming unit was the baile or township, consisting of a few (anything from 4 to 20 or more) families working arable land on the run rig management system, and grazing livestock on common land. Clans provided an effective business model for running the trade in black cattle: the clan gentry managed the collection of those beasts ready for sale and negotiated a price with lowland drovers for all the stock produced on the clan lands. The sale proceeds were offset against the rentals of the individual producers. The growth in the trade in cattle demonstrates the ability of pre-clearance Highland society to adapt to and exploit market opportunities—making clear that this was not an immutable social system.

James VI was one of the kings who sought to impose control on the Highlands. On becoming James I of England in 1603, he gained the military force to do this. The Statutes of Iona controlled some key aspects; it forced the heirs of the wealthier Highlanders to be educated in the Lowlands and required clan chiefs to appear annually in front of the Privy Council in Edinburgh. This exposed the top layer of Highland society to the costs of living in Edinburgh in a manner fitting to their status. Unlike their Lowland counterparts, their lands were less productive and were not well integrated into the money economy. Large financial sureties were taken from clan leaders to guarantee the good behaviour of the clan. Overall, this reduced the need for the protection provided by a clan whilst increasing the costs for the clan leaders. The clan chiefs who fully subscribed to this new system of regulation were rewarded with charters that formalised their ownership of clan lands. The combination of these initiated the demise of clanship. The process continued as clan chiefs began to think of themselves as landlords, rather than as patriarchs of their people.

The various intervals of warfare since the Statutes of Iona reined in the steady transition to landlordism because the ability to raise a band of fighting men at short notice became important again. The civil war that started in 1638 reinvigorated the military aspects. The restoration of Charles II in 1660 brought peace, but also increased taxes, restarting the financial pressure. The succession of Jacobite rebellions emphasised again the martial aspects of clanship, but the defeat at Culloden brought an end to any willingness to go to war again. The loss of heritable jurisdictions across Scotland highlighted the changed role of clan chiefs.

=== Elimination of the tacksman ===
A tacksman (a member of the daoine uaisle, sometimes described as "gentry" in English) was the holder of a lease or "tack" from the landowner, subletting the land to lesser tenants. Tacksmen were often related to the landowner, even if only distantly. They acted as the middle stratum of pre-clearance society, with a significant role in managing the Highland economy.

They were the first sector of Gaelic society to feel the effect of the social and economic changes that included the Clearances, when landlords restricted their power to sub-let, so increasing the rental income directly to the laird; simple rent increases were also applied. This was part of a slow phasing out of this role; it accelerated from the 1770s, and by the next century, tacksmen were a minor component of society. T. M. Devine describes "the displacement of this class as one of the clearest demonstrations of the death of the old Gaelic society."

Many emigrated to America, in the words of Eric Richards: "often cocking a snook at the landlords as they departed". Emigrating tacksmen, and the larger farmers who departed at the same time, represented not only a flight of capital from Gaeldom but also a loss of entrepreneurial energy. In the opinion of T. M. Devine, tacksmen and the middle-ranked tenant farmers represented the economic backbone of the peasant communities of the Western Highlands. Devine repeats the views of Marianne McLean, that those of them who emigrated were not refusing to participate in a commercial economy; rather they rejected the loss of status that the changes of improvement gave them.

== Phases of the Clearances ==
The first phase of the Clearances occurred mostly over the period 1760 to 1815. However, it started before the Jacobite Rising of 1745, with its roots in the decision of the Dukes of Argyll to put tacks (or leases) of farms and townships up for auction. This began with Campbell property in Kintyre in the 1710s and spread after 1737 to all their holdings.

First phase clearances involved break-up of the traditional townships (bailtean), the essential element of land management in Scottish Gaeldom. These multiple tenant farms were most often managed by tacksmen. To replace this system, individual arable smallholdings or crofts were created, with shared access to common grazing. This process was often accompanied by moving the people from the interior straths and glens to the coast, where they were expected to find employment in, for example, the kelp or fishing industries. The properties they had formerly occupied were then converted into large sheep holdings. Essentially, therefore, this phase was characterised by relocation rather than outright expulsion.

The second phase of clearance started in 1815–1820, continuing to the 1850s. It followed the collapse or stagnation of the wartime industries and the continuing rise in population. These economic effects are illustrated by the contemporary commodity prices. Kelp had been falling since 1810; in 1823 the market price in Liverpool was £9 a ton, but it fell to £3 13s 4d a ton in 1828, 41% of the 1823 price. Wool prices also shrank over a similar period to a quarter of the price obtained in 1818, and black cattle nearly halved in price between 1810 and the 1830s.

In the second phase, landlords moved to the more draconian policy of expelling people from their estates. This was increasingly associated with 'assisted emigration', in which landlords cancelled rent arrears and paid the passage of the 'redundant' families in their estates to North America and, in later years, also to Australia. The process reached a climax during the Highland Potato Famine of 1846–1855.

== Regional differences ==
In general terms, the transformation of the Highlands resulted in two different types of rural economy. In the southern and eastern part of the region, as land was enclosed, it was let to fewer tenants, with larger individual holdings. These larger units employed farm servants and labourers and also provided work for cottars and crofters. This workforce included former tenants from the old system. Whilst there were large pastoral farms, there were also mixed and arable farms—both of which needed labour. The population of the south and east Highlands only grew slightly from 1755 to 1841. This is explained by migration to the accessible Lowlands to find work and the relative unavailability of small tenancies. This gave this part of the Highlands some similarities to the Lowland clearances. Together with the better climate of the southern and eastern Highlands, the more diverse agricultural system gave a reasonable level of prosperity to the area.

Agricultural change in the Hebrides and the western coastal areas north of Fort William produced a different economic and social structure. This area is termed the "crofting region"; crofting communities became the dominant social system here, as land was enclosed and the run rig management of the multi-tenant baile replaced. The major part of the land was given over to large-scale pastoral sheep farming. This provided few jobs, compared to the arable and mixed farms in the south and east Highlands. The main industries intended for those displaced to crofting communities were fishing and kelp. Initially, this seemed, to the landlords and their advisors, an ideal way of providing profitable employment for those made redundant by competition for farm leases by the higher-rent-paying sheep farms. Over time, crofts were subdivided, allowing more tenants to live on them (but with less land per person). Crofting communities had a high proportion of cottars—those with the least access to land and without any formal lease to document what they did hold. Population growth was rapid, due to both subdivision and the lower rate of migration to the Lowlands. When the kelp market collapsed a few years after the end of the Napoleonic Wars, the deficiency of the crofting model was exposed: overcrowded communities with limited or no ability to grow enough food for subsistence and now without the industry on which their community relied. This is the area that was most reliant on the potato, and therefore severely hit by the Highland Potato Famine.

The census of 1841 recorded 167,283 people living in the crofting region (as per T. M. Devine's definition of the term), whilst the "farming" south and east Highlands contained 121,224 people.

== Causes ==
Agriculture in the Highlands had always been marginal, with famine a recurrent risk for pre-clearance communities. Nevertheless, population levels increased steadily through the 18th and early 19th centuries. This increase continued through nearly all of the time of the clearances, peaking in 1851, at around 300,000. (Note: Slightly different definitions of the Highland region between historians introduce dangers in citing a precise number.) Emigration was part of Highland history before and during the clearances, and reached its highest level after them. (Note: For instance, the reduction in Highland population in the 1920s was 13.8%.) During the first phase of the clearances, emigration could be considered a form of resistance to the loss of status being imposed by a landlord's social engineering. Different landowners decided to introduce the improvements that required clearance at different times and for different reasons. The common drivers of clearance are as follows:

=== Economic changes ===
Replacement of the old-style peasant farming with a small number of well-capitalised sheep farmers allowed land to be let at much higher rents. It also had the advantage, for the landowner, that there were fewer tenants to collect rent from, thus reducing the administrative burden of the estate.

In some areas, land remained in arable use after clearance but was farmed with more intensive modern methods. Some of the earliest clearances had been to introduce large-scale cattle production. Some later clearances replaced agriculture with sporting estates stocked with deer. There were instances of an estate being first cleared for sheep and later being cleared again for deer. The major transition, however, was to pastoral agriculture based on sheep.

The most productive sheep were the Cheviot, allowing their owners to pay twice as much rent as if they had stocked with Blackfaces. The Cheviot's disadvantage was that it was less hardy and needed low-level land on which to overwinter. This was usually the old arable land of the evicted population, so the choice of sheep breed dictated the totality of clearance in any particular Highland location.

=== Social engineering ===
Some of those carrying out clearances believed that this was for the benefit of those affected. Patrick Sellar, the factor (agent) of the Countess of Sutherland, was descended from a paternal grandfather who had been a cottar in Banffshire and had been cleared by an improving landlord. For the Sellars, this initiated a process of upward mobility (Patrick Sellar was a lawyer and a graduate of Edinburgh University), which Sellar took to be a moral tale that demonstrated the benefits to those forced to make a new start after eviction.

The provision of new accommodation for cleared tenants was often part of a planned piece of social engineering; a large example of this was the Sutherland Clearances, in which farming tenants in the interior were moved to crofts in coastal regions. The intent was that the land allotted to them would not be enough to provide all of their needs, and they would need to seek employment in industries like fishing or as seasonal itinerant farm labourers. The loss of status from tenant farmer to crofter was one of the reasons for the resentment of the Clearances.

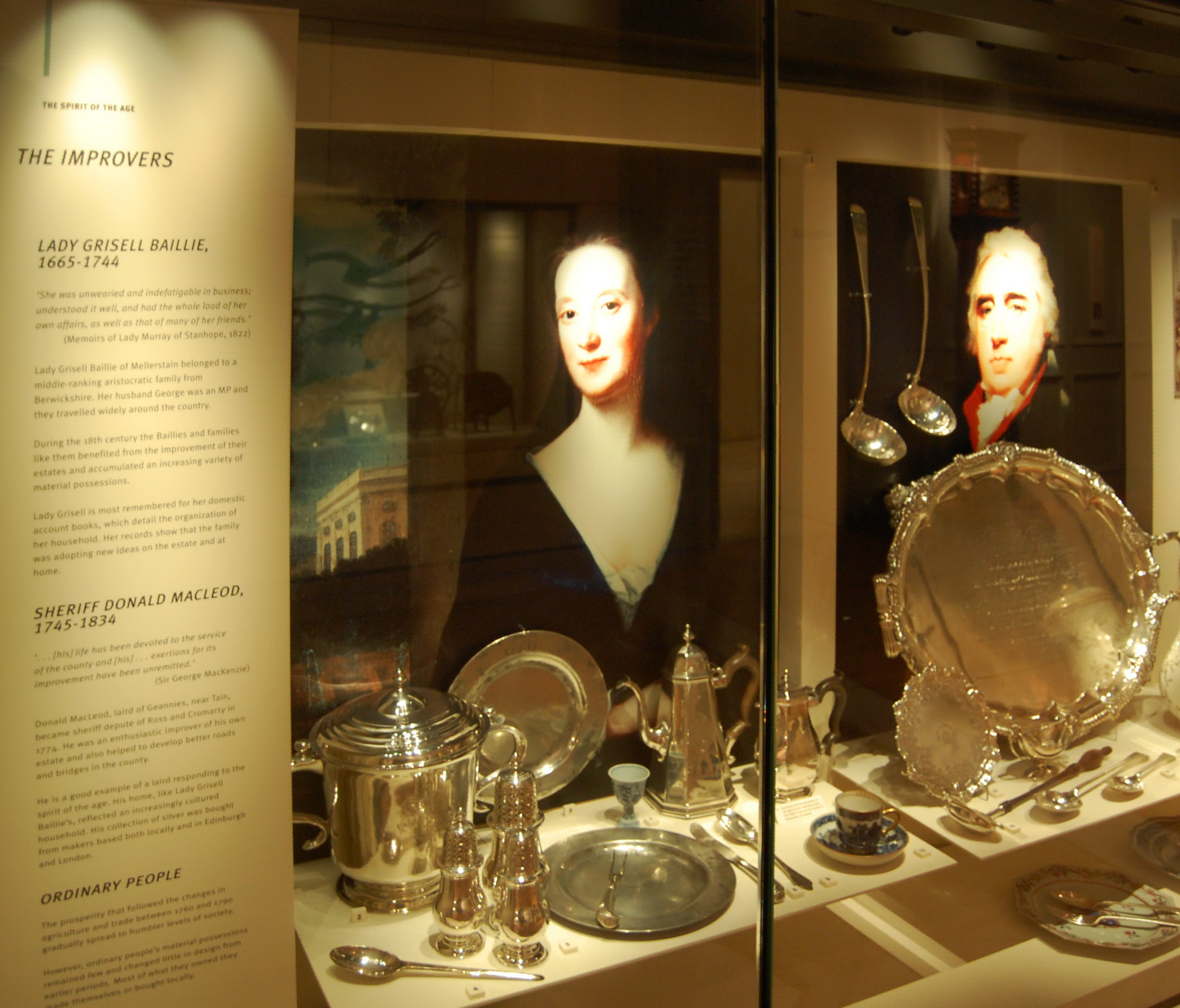
The Lowland improver Lady Grisell Baillie (1665–1744) and Sheriff Donald MacLeod (1745–1834), laird of Geannies, a keen improver, the law officer involved in the 1792 Ross-shire Insurrection, and a widely respected proprietor

The planned acts of social engineering needed investment. This money often originated from fortunes earned outside Scotland, whether from the great wealth of Sir James Matheson (the second son of a Sutherland tacksman, who returned from the Far East with a spectacular fortune), the more ordinary profits from Empire of other returning Scots, or Lowland or English industrialists attracted by lower land values in the Highlands. Large amounts of capital were used to start industrial and commercial enterprises or build infrastructure like roads, bridges and harbours, but the return on this capital was very low by contemporary standards. This wasted investment is described by Eric Richards as "a loss to the national economy to be set beside any gains to be tallied."

Some of this expenditure was used to build new towns, such as Bettyhill, which received tenants cleared from Strathnaver. This displacement has been compared to the movement of Glaswegians to Castlemilk in the 1950s—with a similar distance from the original settlement and a comparable level of overall failure of the project to produce the anticipated social benefits.

In the second phase of the clearances, when population reduction was the primary intention, the actions of landlords can be viewed as the crudest type of social engineering with a very limited understanding of the likely consequences.

=== Failure of the kelp industry ===
The kelp trade was badly affected by the end of the Napoleonic Wars in 1815 and had collapsed totally by 1820. Kelp was harvested from the seashore at low tide, dried and burnt to yield an alkali extract used in the manufacture of soap and glass. It was a very labour-intensive industry. Production had steadily grown from the 1730s to a peak level in 1810, and was mostly located in the Hebrides. The end of war reintroduced competition from Spanish barilla, a cheaper and richer product. This, combined with the reduction of duty on the foreign import, and the discovery that cheaper alkali could be extracted from common salt, destroyed the seasonal employment of an estimated 25 to 40 thousand crofters. There was little prospect of alternative employment; the only possibility was fishing, which was also in decline at the same time.

The overall population of the Western Isles had grown by 80 per cent between 1755 and 1821. The economic collapse of an industry that was a major employer in a greatly over-populated region had an inevitable result. Not only did the level of poverty increase in the general population, but many landlords, failing to make prompt adjustments to their catastrophic fall in income, descended into debt and bankruptcy.

=== Famine ===
The Highlands, as an agriculturally marginal area, was the last part of mainland Britain to remain at risk of famine, with notable instances before the 19th century in 1680, 1688, the 1690s, 1740–41, 1756 and 1782–83. The history of the trade in meal suggests that the region balanced this import with exporting cattle, leading to a substantial reliance on trade for survival that was greater than anywhere else in Britain.

There was near-contemporaneous dispute as to the severity of famines in the pre-clearance Highlands: in 1845, the Sutherland estate management argued among themselves over the level of famine relief that had been needed in the past, including this opinion: "The cattle on Sutherland were that Spring dying from scarcity of provender... and this is the condition to which your morbid Philanthropists of the present day refer as the days of comfort for the wretched Highlanders." (11 June 1845 letter to James Loch). Even accepting the level of debate on the subject among historians and the incomplete body of evidence, there is a clear case that, for example, pre-clearance Strathnaver (in Sutherland) experienced recurrent famine in a society operating at the margin of subsistence.

Crofting communities became more common in the early part of the 19th century. Particularly in the West Highlands and the Isles, the residents of these small agricultural plots were reliant on potatoes for at least three quarters of their diet. Until 1750, potatoes had been relatively uncommon in the Highlands. With a crop yield four times higher than oats, they became an integral part of crofting. After partial crop failures in 1836 and 1837, a severe outbreak of potato blight arrived in Scotland in 1846. Blight continued to seriously affect the Highland potato crop until about 1856. This was famine of a much greater scale and duration than anything previously experienced. By the end of 1846, the north-west Highlands and the Hebrides had serious food shortages, with an estimated three quarters of the population with nothing to eat.

The Highland Potato Famine started a year after potato blight had first struck Ireland. The knowledge of the Irish catastrophe helped mobilise a response to the Highland crisis, with government action, the establishment of a large charitable fund (the Central Board for Highland Destitution) and much more responsible landlord behaviour than seen in Ireland. The richer landlords, such as the Duke of Sutherland, were able to fund their own famine relief for their tenants. Some, already overstretched by large debts, were bankrupted by providing the necessary relief. The landlord of most of Islay, Walter Frederick Campbell, was a spectacular example. Another whose benevolence during the crisis brought bankruptcy was Norman MacLeod of MacLeod, owner of one of the two major estates in Skye. Conversely, some landlords were criticised for using the voluntarily raised relief funds to avoid supporting their tenants through the crisis. A few were recipients of strongly critical letters from senior civil servants, with threats that the government would recover the cost of famine relief from those who could provide it, but chose not to.

Clearance and emigration were an integral part of the Highland potato famine; the length and severity of the crisis seemed to leave little alternative. The choice faced by the government was between indefinitely continuing with charitable efforts and public works, or removing the excess population permanently. Rumours circulated, from 1849, that the government planned to introduce an 'able-bodied Poor Law', so formally putting the potentially crippling burden of famine relief on each parish (and hence on the landlord); the Central Board made clear that they would wind up their relief effort in 1850. The new Highland landowner class (who had bought financially failing estates) and the remaining wealthier hereditary landlords had the funds to support emigration of their destitute tenants. The result was that almost 11,000 people were provided with "assisted passages" by their landlords between 1846 and 1856, with the greatest number travelling in 1851. A further 5,000 emigrated to Australia, through the Highland and Island Emigration Society. To this should be added an unknown, but significant number, who paid their own fares to emigrate, and a further unknown number assisted by the Colonial Land and Emigration Commission.

=== Landlord debt ===
Many Highland landlords were in debt, despite rising commodity prices and the associated farm incomes which allowed higher rents to be charged. The origin of some of this debt went back to the Statutes of Iona, when some lairds were forced to live part of the year in Edinburgh – much more expensive than living on their own lands. Profligate spending was a significant cause. The costs of involvement in political activity was a factor for some. The landed classes of the Highlands socialised with southern landowners, who had more diverse sources of income, such as mineral royalties and windfall income from urban expansion. The low productivity of Highland lands made this a financial trap for their owners. In other cases, spending on famine relief depleted the financial resources of landowners—so even the prudent and responsible could ultimately be forced to increase the income from their estates. Lastly, investments in an estate, whether on roads, drainage, enclosure or other improvements might not realise the anticipated returns. The major financial pressure, though, was the end of the Napoleonic Wars, which had supported high prices for the small range of commodities produced in the Highlands.

The extent of indebtedness among Highland landowners was enormous. The evidence of this is the very high number of hereditary lands that were sold, especially in the first half of the 19th century. Over two-thirds of Highland estates had changed hands in this way by the end of the 1850s. Eric Richards describes this as a "financial suicide" by an entire class of people. Debt was not a new problem for Highland landowners in the 19th century—it had been equally prevalent in the 17th and 18th. The change was in the lender. The further development of the banking system at the beginning of the 19th century meant that landowners did not need to look to family members or neighbours as a source of finance. The downside to this was a greater readiness of the lender to foreclose—and an increased willingness to lend in the first place, perhaps unwisely.

Debt had three possible consequences, all of which were likely to involve the eviction of tenants. The landlord could try to avoid bankruptcy by introducing immediate improvements, putting up rents, clearing tenants to allow higher-paying sheep farmers to be installed. Alternatively, the estate could be sold to wipe out the debts. A new owner was highly likely to have plans for improvement which would include clearance. They also had the money to fund assisted passages for cleared tenants to emigrate, so putting into practice ideas suggested in the 1820s and 1830s. As most purchasers were from outside the Highlands or from England, they neither understood nor followed the Gaelic principle of dùthchas, (Note: "A collective claim on the land which is reinforced and lived out through the shared management of that land. It is a right which is grounded in daily habits and activities and it is bound up with relationships to others, and responsibilities. It gives rise to the idea, identified by the scholar Michael Newton, that 'people belong to places rather than places belonging to people'." An alternative view of dùthchas is that it was an obligation on chiefs to provide land for their clansmen—not a specific place, but simply somewhere in the clan territory. This gives a different view of the level of security of tenure in the pre-clearance era.) so removing a potential level of protection for tenants. Finally, the landlord might enter bankruptcy, with the estate passing into the hands of administrators whose legal obligation was to protect the financial interests of the creditors. This last case was often the worst outcome for tenants, with any considerations of them having no relevance whatsoever under the law.

=== Overpopulation ===
The 18th century was a time of population growth, almost continuous from the 1770s onwards. This was not initially seen as a problem by landlords as people were considered to be an asset—both to provide a pool for military recruitment and as an economic resource. Landowners and the government sought to discourage emigration, an attitude that resulted in the Passenger Vessels Act 1803, which was intended to limit the ability of people to emigrate.

The role of the Highlands in providing a source of recruitment for the army and navy was, in the words of T. M. Devine, "quite remarkable". Starting in the Seven Years' War (1756–1763) and increasing during the American War of Independence, by the time of the Napoleonic Wars, one estimate put the Highland contribution to regiments of the line, militia, Fencibles and Volunteers at 74,000. This was out of a population of about 300,000. Even allowing for this estimate overstating the case, in time of war, the Highlands was seen as a significant recruiting resource.

The attitude towards increasing population was altered in the first half of the 19th century. First, the kelp trade collapsed in the years immediately following the end of the Napoleonic Wars in 1815. Those working in the kelp trade were crofters, with not enough land to make a living, or cottars, the very poorest in society with the least access to land on which to grow food. Without alternative employment, which was not available, destitution was inevitable. The landlords (or in some cases the trustees of their bankrupt estates) no longer tried to retain their tenants on their land, either encouraging or assisting emigration, or, in the more desperate circumstances, virtually compelling those in substantial rent arrears to accept an assisted passage (i.e., to emigrate), with the alternative of simple eviction.

The potato famine followed shortly after the collapse of the kelp industry. Faced with a severe famine, the government made clear to any reluctant landlords that they had the primary responsibility of feeding their destitute tenants, whether through employment in public works or estate improvement, or simply by the provision of famine relief. The threat of full application, and possible reform, of the Poor Laws (that would have had the effect of formalising the obligation to feed all the destitute in each parish) was the final impetus to the various assisted emigration measures.

In the decades following 1815, the ideological and political consensus changed. Surplus population slowly became thought of as a liability; their need to be fed could not be ignored in a philanthropic age. Therefore, large-scale expatriation was considered as a solution to the social crisis in the Highlands. The ideas of Malthus were adopted by many in a position to influence policy. The Passenger Vessels Act was repealed in 1827 and in 1841 a select committee of the House of Commons concluded that the crofting parishes had a surplus population of 45,000 to 60,000.

=== Discrimination ===
The primary motivation for clearance was economic. Associated with this was the suggestion by some theorists that the Celtic population were less hardworking than those of Anglo-Saxon stock (i.e., Lowlanders and, in some instances, English), so giving an economic element to a racial theory. James Hunter quotes a contemporary Lowland newspaper: 'Ethnologically the Celtic race is an inferior one and, attempt to disguise it as we may, there is ... no getting rid of the great cosmical fact that it is destined to give way ... before the higher capabilities of the Anglo-Saxon.' These views were held by people like Patrick Sellar, the factor employed by the Countess of Sutherland to put her plans into effect, who often wrote of his support for these ideas, and Sir Charles Trevelyan, the senior government representative in organising famine relief during the Highland Potato Famine. (Trevelyan regarded himself as a "reformed Celt", having a Cornish Celtic heritage.) There is little doubt that racism against the Gael formed some part of the story.

Roman Catholics had experienced a sequence of discriminatory laws in the period up to 1708. Whilst English versions of these laws were repealed in 1778, in Scotland this did not happen until 1793. However, religious discrimination is not considered, by some historians, to be a reason for evicting tenants as part of any clearance, and is seen more as a source of voluntary emigration by writers such as Eric Richards. There is one clear (and possibly solitary) case of harassment of Catholics which resulted in eviction by Colin MacDonald of Boisdale (a recent convert to Presbyterianism). This temporarily stalled when the risk of empty farms (and therefore loss of rent) became apparent when voluntary emigration to escape persecution was possible. However, in 1771, thirty-six families did not have their leases renewed (out of some 300 families who were tenants of Boisdale); 11 of these emigrated the next year with financial assistance from the Roman Catholic church.

== Individual events ==
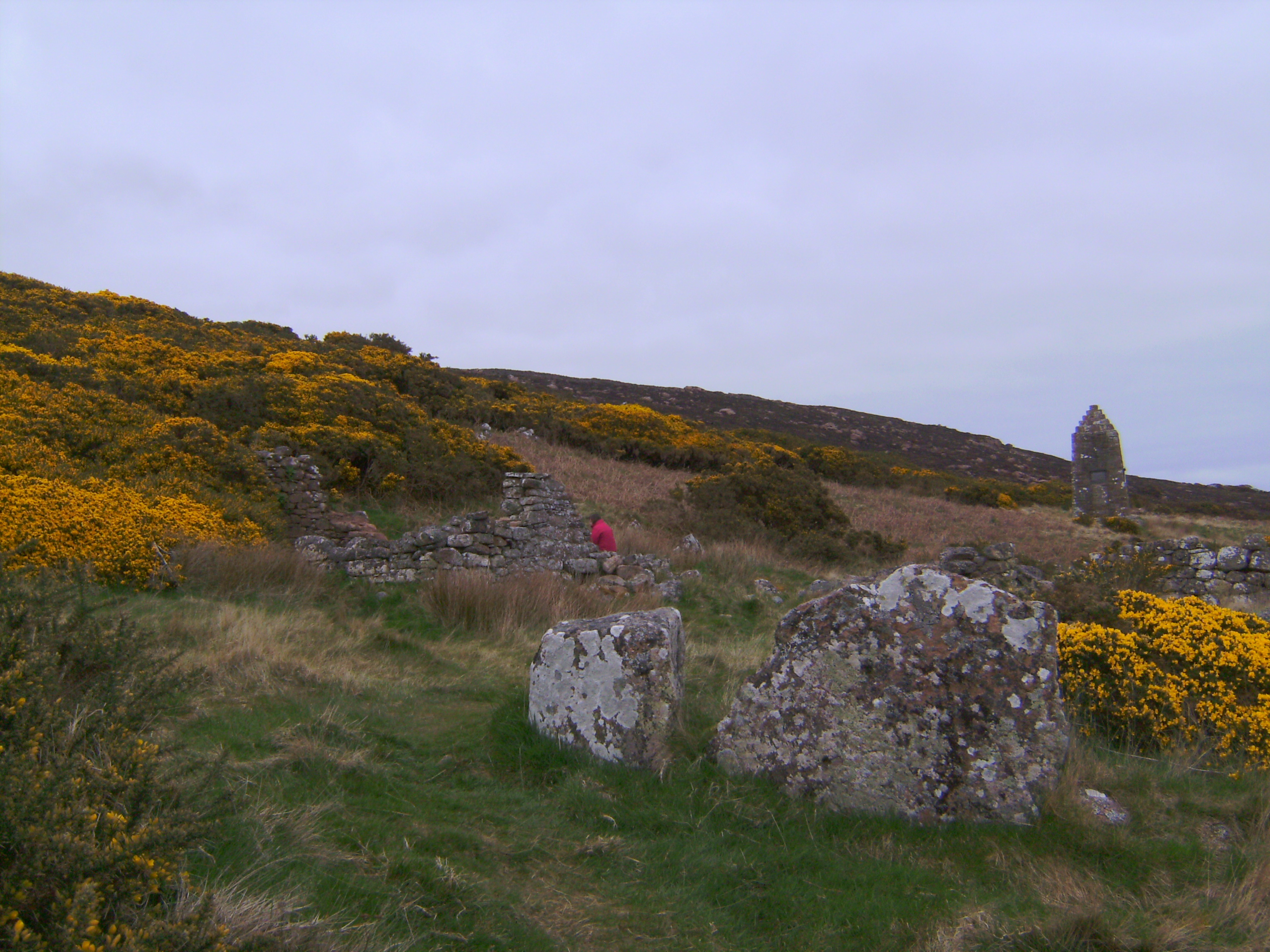
Ruins of the Badbea longhouses with the 1911 monument in the background

=== Year of the sheep ===
In 1792 tenant farmers from Strathrusdale led a protest by driving more than 6,000 sheep off the land surrounding Ardross. It was the first large protest over clearances. It started when land was let to sheep farmers who repeatedly impounded the cattle of neighbouring tenants, alleging that they had strayed onto the sheep grazing. Eventually, the owners of the cattle obtained the help of tenants of a nearby estate, and went and recovered their stock after an angry confrontation. Emboldened by this success, a few days later, at a wedding celebration, a plan was developed to round up all the sheep and drive them south over the River Beauly. It was put into effect in a highly organised manner, gathering all the sheep in the area (except that of Donald Macleod of Geanies, the Sheriff Depute of Ross - perhaps out of either fear or respect for him). The first flocks were gathered on the 31 July and by 4 August many thousand sheep had been collected.

The protest was seen by local landowners and law officers in the context of revolution in France, and caused alarm. As Sheriff Depute, Donald Macleod reported events to the Lord Advocate, Robert Dundas, in Edinburgh, asking for military help. The request was forwarded to London, where Henry Dundas (Robert's uncle) gave orders for the Black Watch to be sent north to assist. Until they arrived, Macleod avoided the risk of any action against the protestors that might not be successful. In the early hours of 5 August, Macleod, a large party of the gentry from the region, and three companies of soldiers moved to where the sheep had been gathered. Most of the protestors fled, but eight were captured in the vicinity and a further four were taken in their homes. The protest rapidly faded away. Eight of the captives were tried on charges of assaulting the sheep farmers who had impounded their cattle, but were acquitted on the grounds that the violence was self defence. Seven of the prisoners were tried on charges of insurrection and found guilty. The penalties, at a time when the death penalty was frequently used, were mild. The most severe was seven years transportation to Australia for two of the protestors. This was not carried out, because they escaped from the prison cells in the Inverness Tolbooth. No serious attempt was made to track the escapees down.

== Examples of individual clearances ==
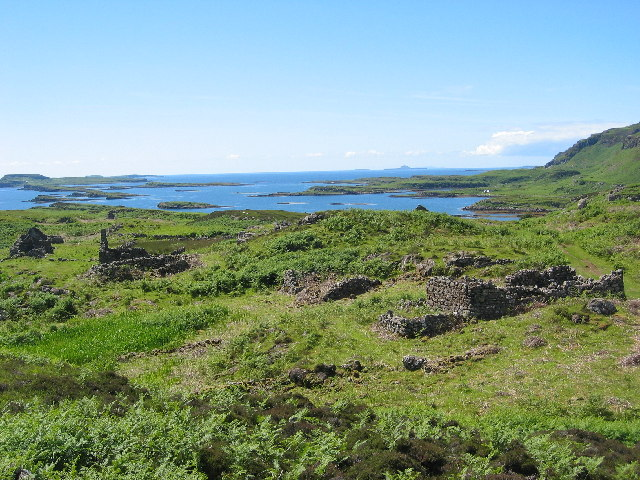
Ormaig was once the principal settlement on the Isle of Ulva near Mull. It had been inhabited since prehistoric times, until it was cleared by Francis William Clark in the mid-19th century.

Two of the best documented clearances are those from the land of the Duchess of Sutherland, carried out by, among other people, her factor Patrick Sellar, and the Glencalvie clearances which were witnessed and documented by a London Times reporter.

=== The Sutherland Clearances ===
The Sutherland estate was inherited by Elizabeth Sutherland when she was one year old. It consisted of about half of the county of Sutherland, and purchases between 1812 and 1816 increased it to around 63%, as measured by rental value. On 4 September 1785, at the age of 20, Lady Sutherland married George Granville Leveson-Gower, Viscount Trentham, who was known as Earl Gower from 1786 until he succeeded to his father's title of Marquess of Stafford in 1803. In 1832, just six months before he died, he was created Duke of Sutherland and she became known as Duchess-Countess of Sutherland.

When Lady Sutherland inherited the estate, there were many wadsets (a type of mortgage) on much of the land; like many Highland estates, it had substantial debts. Some removals (Note: In the terminology used by estates at the time, removals meant that tenants were evicted from one part of the estate and offered alternative tenancies elsewhere) were made in 1772 while Lady Sutherland was still a child and the estate was managed by her tutors. They tried to dislodge many of the tacksmen (Note: A tacksman (a member of the daoine uaisle, sometimes described as "gentry" in English) was the holder of a lease or "tack" from the landowner, subletting the land to lesser tenants. They acted as the middle stratum of pre-clearance society, with a significant role in managing the Highland economy. They were involved in running the baile, and trade in and out of the Highlands, especially in black cattle. They were the first sector of society to feel the effect of the social and economic changes that included the Clearances, when landlords restricted their ability to sub-let, so increasing the rental income directly to the laird; simple rent increases were also applied. This was part of a slow phasing out of this role, with change gathering momentum from the 1770s, with the result that in the next century, tacksmen were a minor component of society. T. M. Devine describes "the displacement of this class as one of the clearest demonstrations of the death of the old Gaelic society.") on the estate. Many tenants had emigrated, and new fishing villages were planned to provide employment for tenants moved from the interior but these plans did not proceed because the estate was short of money.

In 1803 Leveson-Gower inherited the huge fortune of the Duke of Bridgewater, and the estate now had the money for improvements. Many of the estate's leases did not end until 1807, but planning was started to restructure the estate. Despite the conventions of the day and the provisions of the entailment on Lady Sutherland's inheritance, Leveson-Gower delegated overall control of the estate to his wife; she took an active interest in its management. As the major part of the Sutherland Clearances began, Lady Sutherland and her advisors were influenced by several things. First, the population was increasing. Second, the area was prone to famine; and it fell to the landlord to organise relief by buying meal and importing it into the area. How bad the famine was is debated, both among modern historians and also within the Sutherland Estate management soon after the clearances in 1845. (Note: In 1808 Lady Sutherland wrote to her husband, saying that many of the tenants would have died if the factor had not bought corn from Peterhead to feed them. (The cost of this was later repaid by the recipients: it was in effect a large emergency loan program.) The same year featured in the recollections of an estate advisor (in 1845): "The cattle on Sutherland were that Spring dying from scarcity of Provender....and this is the condition to which your morbid Philanthropists of the present day refer as the days of comfort for the wretched Highlanders.") The third driving force was the whole range of thinking on agricultural improvement. This took in economic ideas expressed by Adam Smith as well as those of many agriculturalists. For the Highlands, the main thrust of these theories was the much greater rental return to be obtained from sheep. Wool prices had increased faster than other commodities since the 1780s. This enabled sheep farmers to pay substantially higher rents than the current tenants.

==== Patrick Sellar ====
Now that capital funding was available, the first big sheep farm was let at Lairg in 1807, involving the removal of about 300 people. Many of these did not accept their new homes and emigrated, to the dissatisfaction of the estate management and Lady Sutherland. In 1809, William Young and Patrick Sellar arrived in Sutherland and made contact with the Sutherland family, becoming key advisors to the owners of the estate. They offered ambitious plans which matched the wish for rapid results. Lady Sutherland had already dismissed the estate's factor, David Campbell, in 1807 for lack of progress. His replacement, Cosmo Falconer found his position being undermined by the advice offered by Young and Sellar. In August 1810 Falconer agreed to leave, with effect from 2 June 1811, and Young and Sellar took over in his place. (Note: The details of this joint position were not well worked out—so providing reason for Sellar to complain about his role to Lady Sutherland even before the agreement came into effect. Young had the senior position and was responsible for 'progressive improvements' on the estate, whilst Sellar (who had trained as a lawyer) collected rents, kept accounts, drafted leases, ensured tenants complied with the terms of their leases and enforced the protection of plantations and game on the estate.)

Young had a proven track record of agricultural improvement in Moray and Sellar was a lawyer educated at Edinburgh University; both were fully versed in the modern ideas of Adam Smith. They provided an extra level of ambition for the estate. New industries were added to the plans, to employ the resettled population. A coal mine was sunk at Brora, and fishing villages were built to exploit the herring shoals off the coast. Other ideas were tanning, flax, salt and brick manufacturing.

The first clearances under the factorship of Young and Sellar were in Assynt in 1812, under the direction of Sellar, establishing large sheep farms and resettling the old tenants on the coast. Sellar had the assistance of the local tacksmen in this and the process was conducted without unrest—despite the unpopularity of events. However, in 1813, planned clearances in the Strath of Kildonan were accompanied by riots: an angry mob drove prospective sheep farmers out of the valley when they came to view the land. A situation of confrontation existed for more than six weeks, with Sellar failing to successfully negotiate with the protesters. Ultimately, the army was called out and the estate made concessions such as paying very favourable prices for the cattle of those being cleared. This was assisted by landlords in surrounding districts taking in some of those displaced and an organised party emigrating to Canada. The whole process was a severe shock to Lady Sutherland and her advisers, who were, in the words of historian Eric Richards, "genuinely astonished at this response to plans which they regarded as wise and benevolent".

Further clearances were scheduled in Strathnaver starting at Whitsun, 1814. These were complicated by Sellar having successfully bid for the lease of one of the new sheep farms on land that it was now his responsibility, as factor, to clear. (Overall, this clearance was part of the removal of 430 families from Strathnaver and Brora in 1814 – an estimated 2,000 people.) Sellar had also made an enemy of the local law officer, Robert Mackid, by catching him poaching on the Sutherland's land. There was some confusion among the tenants as Sellar made concessions to some of them, allowing them to stay in their properties a little longer. Some tenants moved in advance of the date in their eviction notice – others stayed until the eviction parties arrived.

As was normal practice, the roof timbers of cleared houses were destroyed to prevent re-occupation after the eviction party had left. On 13 June 1814, this was done by burning at Badinloskin, the house occupied by William Chisholm. Accounts vary, but it is possible that his elderly and bedridden mother-in-law was still in the house when it was set on fire. In James Hunter's understanding of events, Sellar ordered her to be immediately carried out as soon as he realised what was happening. The old lady died 6 days later. Eric Richards suggests that the old woman was carried to an outbuilding before the house was destroyed. Whatever the facts of the matter, Sellar was charged with culpable homicide and arson, in respect of this incident and others during this clearance. The charges were brought by Robert Mackid, driven by the enmity he held for Sellar for catching him poaching. As the trial approached, the Sutherland estate was reluctant to assist Sellar in his defence, distancing themselves from their employee. He was acquitted of all charges at his trial in 1816. The estate were hugely relieved, taking this as a justification of their clearance activity. (Robert Mackid had to leave the county to rebuild his career elsewhere, providing Sellar with a grovelling letter of apology and confession.)

Despite the acquittal, this event, and Sellar's role in it, was fixed in the popular view of the Sutherland Clearances. James Loch, the Stafford estate commissioner was now taking a greater interest in the Northern part of his employer's holdings; he thought Young's financial management was incompetent, and Sellar's actions among the people deeply concerning. Both Sellar and William Young soon left their management posts with the Sutherland estate (though Sellar remained as a major tenant). Loch, nevertheless, also subscribed to the theory that clearance was beneficial for the tenants as much as for the estate.

Lady Sutherland's displeasure with events was added to by critical reports in a minor London newspaper, the Military Register, from April 1815. These were soon carried in larger newspapers. They originated from Alexander Sutherland, who, with his brother John Sutherland of Sciberscross, (Note: The territorial designation after his name denotes that the Sutherland brothers were members of the daoine uaisle or tacksman class, sometimes described as 'gentry'.) were opponents of clearance. Alexander, after serving as a captain in the army had been thwarted in his hopes to take up leases on the Sutherland estate and now worked as a journalist in London. He was therefore well placed to cause trouble for the estate.

==== James Loch ====
The (effective) dismissal of Sellar placed him in the role of scapegoat, thereby preventing a proper critical analysis of the estate's policies. Clearances continued under the factorship of Frances Suther and the overall control of James Loch. Through 1816 and 1817, famine conditions affected most of the inland areas and the estate had to provide relief to those who were destitute. This altered policy on emigration: if tenants wanted to emigrate, the estate would not object, but there was still no active encouragement.

In 1818 the largest part of the clearance program was put into effect, lasting until 1820. Loch gave emphatic instructions intended to avoid another public relations disaster: rent arrears could be excused for those who co-operated, time was to be taken and rents for the new crofts were to be set as low as possible.

The process did not start well. The Reverend David Mackenzie of Kildonan wrote to Loch on behalf of the 220 families due to be cleared from his parish. He categorically challenged the basic premise of the clearance: that the people from an inland region could make a living on their new coastal crofts. Loch was adamant that the removals would go ahead regardless of objections. Yet, at the same time, Suther and the local ground officer of the estate were pointing out to Loch that few of the new crofts were of an acceptable quality. Some tenants were considering moving off the estate, either to Caithness or emigrating to America or the Cape of Good Hope, which Suther encouraged by writing off their rent arrears. More positively for those with eviction notices, cattle prices were high in 1818. Ultimately, that year's clearances passed without serious protest.

Over the next two years the scale of clearance increased: 425 families (about 2,000 people) in 1819 and 522 families in 1820. Loch was anxious to move quickly, whilst cattle prices were high and there was a good demand for leases of sheep farms. There was no violent resistance in 1819, but Suther, despite precise instructions to the contrary, used fire to destroy cleared houses. This came after a spell of dry weather, in which the turf and stone walls of the houses had dried out, so that even the turf in the walls ignited, adding to the blaze of the thatch and roof timbers. Multiplied over the large number of properties that were cleared, this made a horrific impression on those who observed it. The public relations disaster that Loch had wished to avoid now followed, with The Observer newspaper running the headline: "the Devastation of Sutherland". 1819 became known as "the year of the burnings" (bliadhna na losgaidh). (Note: The journalist and popular author John Prebble, in his book published in 1963 attributes the term "the year of the burnings" to 1814. This appears to be an error, but as Prebble's book was widely read, this has been copied into many of the minor populist works on the subject. The account of Donald MacLeod, who claims to have been an eye-witness to the Sutherland Clearances, though it does not use the term "year of the burnings", strongly suggests that historian James Hunter's interpretation of the phrase is correct.) (Note: Loch severely admonished Suther for using fire in making the houses uninhabitable. Suther defended his actions by explaining how cleared tenants in Kildonan had rebuilt their houses as soon as the eviction parties had left. Loch conceded that this was one of the realities of the process of clearance, but did not rescind the prohibition of burning houses from which tenants had been evicted.)

In the autumn of 1819, the Sutherland Estate management received reports of growing hostility to further clearances. The Sutherland family were sent anonymous threatening letters to their house in London. The Transatlantic Emigration Society provided a focus for resistance to the clearances planned in 1820, holding large meetings and conducting extensive correspondence with newspapers about the situation of Sutherland tenants. This publicity caused great concern to Loch, and the comment in the press increased as Whitsun 1820 approached. Lady Sutherland felt that her family was being particularly targeted by critics of the clearances, so she asked Loch to find out what neighbouring estates had done. The answer was that Lord Moray in Ross-shire had, on occasion, bought the cattle owned by evicted tenants, but otherwise had made no provision for them: they had simply been evicted with no compensation or alternative tenancies offered. The tenants of Munro of Novar were also simply evicted, with many of them emigrating. As the 1820 Sutherland clearances approached, there was notable rioting at Culrain on the Munro of Novar estate, protesting at their clearance plans. Loch worried that this would spread to the Sutherland tenants, but no violent physical resistance occurred, with those cleared demonstrating (in the words of Eric Richards) "sullen acquiescence". In June there was serious resistance to clearance in another nearby estate, at Gruids. Richards attributes the lack of violence in the Sutherland Estate to the resettlement arrangements in place there, stating: "In this sense the Sutherland estate was, despite its reputation, in strong and positive contrast to most other clearing proprietors."

1819 and 1820 represented the main clearance activity on the Sutherland Estate. The much smaller clearance in the spring of 1821 at Achness and Ascoilmore met with obstruction and the military had to be called in to carry out evictions by force. Complaints were made against the estate of cruelty and negligence, but an internal enquiry absolved the factor of any wrongdoing. However, it is highly likely that this conclusion glossed over the suffering experienced by those evicted.

Figures gathered by the estate give some information on where tenants, sub-tenants and squatters (Note: Not everyone who was evicted was a rent-paying tenant. Some had no legal right to be there in the first place.) went after the evictions in 1819. For tenants, 68% became tenants elsewhere on the estate, 7% went to neighbouring estates, 21% to adjoining counties and 2% emigrated. The remaining 2% were unaccounted for. The sub-tenants and squatters were divided up into 73% resettled on the coast, 7% in neighbouring estates, 13% to nearby counties and 5% emigrated. Two per cent were unaccounted for. This survey does not pick up information on those who subsequently travelled elsewhere.

Loch issued instructions to Suther at the end of 1821 that brought the major clearance activity of the estate to an end. Some small-scale clearance activity continued for the next 20 years or so, but this was not part of the overall plan to resettle the population in coastal settlements and engage them in alternative industries.

=== Glengarry ===
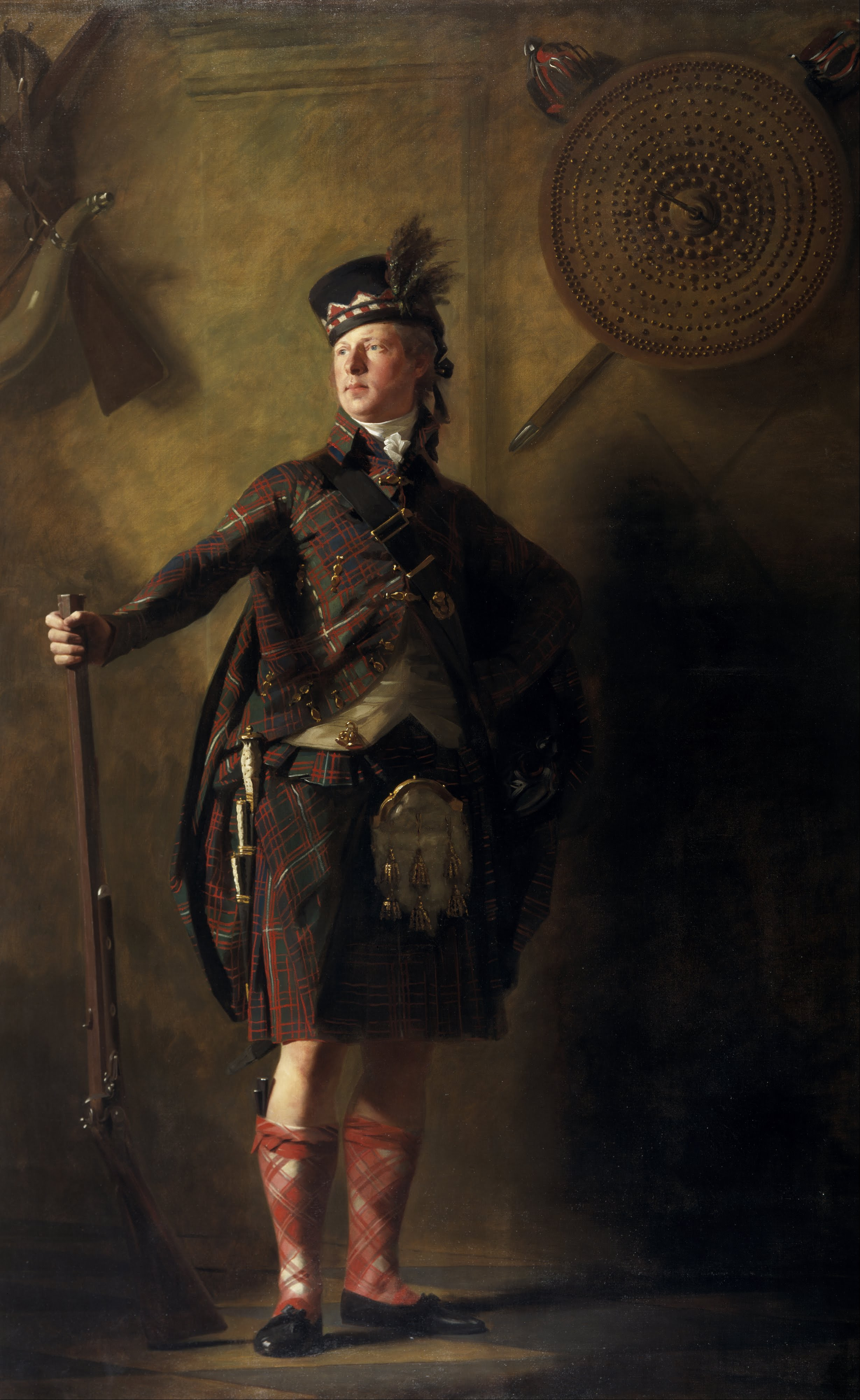
Portrait by Henry Raeburn of Alexander Ranaldson MacDonell of Glengarry in 1812. MacDonnell claimed to support Highland culture, while simultaneously clearing his tenants.

The flamboyant Alexander Ranaldson MacDonell of Glengarry portrayed himself as the last genuine specimen of the true Highland chief while his tenants (almost all Catholic) were subjected to a relentless process of eviction. He abandoned his disbanded regiment; its Catholic chaplain (later bishop), Alexander Macdonell led the men and their families to settle in Glengarry County, eastern Ontario, Canada.

== Resistance ==
It has frequently been asserted that Gaels reacted to the Clearances with apathy and a near-total absence of active resistance from the crofting population. However, upon closer examination this view is at best an oversimplification. While troops intervened on at least 10 occasions, Richards notes that not a single death has been directly attributed to the physical act of the clearances themselves. Michael Lynch suggests that there were more than 50 major acts of resistance to clearance. Even before the Crofters' War of the 1880s, Gaelic communities had staved off or even averted removals by accosting law enforcement officials and destroying eviction notices, such as in Coigach, Ross-shire, 1852–53. Women took the front line in opposing the authorities, with their male relatives backing them up. Lowland shepherds imported to work the new sheep farms were subject to intimidating letters and maiming or theft of the sheep. More than 1,500 sheep were stolen on the Sutherland estate in a single year in the early 19th century. Many forms of resistance were practised under the table, such as poaching. After the introduction of watermills at Milton Farm, South Uist, in the early nineteenth century, the tenants continued to hand-grind their grain with querns. As this was considered undesirable, the landlord had the querns broken; similar episodes were recorded in Skye and Tiree. After the Disruption of 1843, many Gaelic-speaking areas deserted the Church of Scotland in favour of the Free Church, which refused to take money from landlords and was often overtly critical of them.

Richards describes three attempts at large-scale resistance before the Crofters' War: the Year of the Sheep, protests against Patrick Sellar's clearance of Strathnaver in 1812–1814, and the "Dudgeonite agitation" in Easter Ross in 1819–1820, sparked by a local tacksman's organization of an emigration fund.

=== Crofters' Holdings (Scotland) Act 1886 ===
The Highland Land League eventually achieved land reform in the enactment of the Crofters' Holdings (Scotland) Act 1886 (49 & 50 Vict. c. 29), but these could not bring economic viability and came too late, at a time when the land was already suffering from depopulation. However, the Crofters' Holdings (Scotland) Act 1886 put an end to the Clearances by granting security of tenure to crofters.

However, the Crofters' Act did not grant security of tenure to cottars or break up large estates. As a result, the Scottish Highlands continues to have the most unequal distributions of land in Europe, with more than half of Scotland owned by fewer than 500 people. Land struggles occurred after the First and Second World Wars as returning servicemen could not get crofts.

== Legacy ==
The clearances continue to be debated between historians and others who approach the subject with different analysis of sources and determination of causes. As such, there are significant differences between the understanding of the Highland clearances held by historians and the popular view of these events. Furthermore, the historical analysis is complicated by political views, including an ongoing debate about who should possess and exercise control over land in Scotland.

The clearances were condemned by many writers at the time, and in the late 19th century they were invoked in opposition to the enormous power of landlords under Scottish law and calls for land reform related to crofting, notably in Alexander Mackenzie's 1883 History of the Highland Clearances. The effects of the clearances were evoked in fictional works by authors including Neil M. Gunn and Fionn MacColla in the 1930s and 1940s. The subject was largely ignored by academic historians until the publication of a best-selling history book by John Prebble in 1963 attracted worldwide attention to his view that Highlanders had been forced into tragic exile by their former chieftains turned brutal landlords. Though some historians have disputed this work as an over-simplification, other authors went further and stated that it promoted misconceptions that the clearances were equivalent to genocide or ethnic cleansing and/or that British authorities in London played a major, persistent role in carrying them out. In particular, popular remembrance of the Highland clearances is sometimes intertwined with the comparatively short-lived reprisals that followed the failed Jacobite rebellion of 1745. However, a large body of thoroughly researched academic work now exists on the subject, differing significantly from the accounts of Prebble and his successors. As there are so many historical works now focused on the Highlands, there is even an argument that the balance of journals and books in all Scottish history is now excessively tilted toward the Highlands, forgetting the clearances that took place in the Lowlands as well.

=== Literature ===
==== Poetry ====
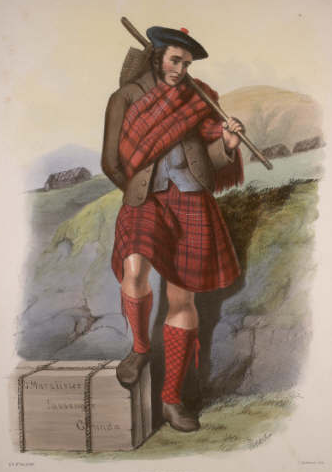
A romanticised early Victorian depiction of a member of Clan MacAlister leaving Scotland for Canada, by R. R. McIan

Many Gaelic poets were heavily influenced by the Clearances. Responses varied from sadness and nostalgia, which dominated the poetry of Niall MacLeòid, to the anger and call to action found in the work of Mary MacPherson. The best-known Scottish Gaelic poem of the 20th century, Hallaig, was written by Sorley MacLean about a cleared village near where he grew up on Raasay; many of his other poems deal with the effects of the Clearances.

Many songs were in the form of satire of the landlord class. Perhaps the most famous of these is Dùthaich Mhic Aoidh (Mackay Country or Northern Sutherland, a region hit hard by the Clearances), written by Ewen Robertson, who became known as the "Bard of the Clearances." The song mocks the Duke of Sutherland, his factor, Patrick Sellar, James Loch, James Anderson, and others involved in the Sutherland Clearances. (Note: Ciad Diùc Cataibh, le chuid foill, 'S le chuid càirdeas do na Goill, Gum b' ann an Iutharn 'n robh do thoil, 'S gum b'fheàrr leam Iùdas làmh rium. Translation: First Duke of Sutherland, with your deceit, And with your friendship with the Lowlanders, It's in hell that you belong, I'd rather have Judas by my side.) Similar sentiments were expressed with regard to the Ardnamurchan Clearances by a local doctor, Iain MacLachlainn. The Canadian Boat-Song expresses the desolation felt by some emigrants:

Yet still the blood is strong, the heart is Highland,
And we in dreams behold the Hebrides.

==== Prose ====
The clearances were an influential theme in Scottish literature, with notable examples such as Consider the Lilies, a novel by Iain Crichton Smith.

=== Memorials to the Clearances ===
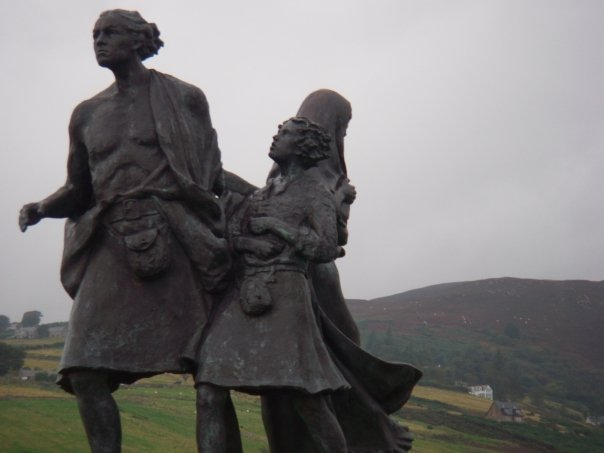
The emigrants statue commemorates the flight of Highlanders during the Clearances, but it is also a testament to their accomplishments in the places they settled. Located at the foot of the Highland Mountains in Helmsdale, Scotland.

On 23 July 2007, the Scottish First Minister Alex Salmond unveiled a three-metre-high (10-foot) bronze Exiles statue, by Gerald Laing, in Helmsdale, Sutherland, which commemorates the people who were cleared from the area by landowners and left their homeland to begin new lives overseas. The statue, which depicts a family leaving their home, stands at the mouth of the Strath of Kildonan and was funded by Dennis Macleod, a Scottish-Canadian mining millionaire who also attended the ceremony.

An identical three-metre-high bronze Exiles statue has also been set up on the banks of the Red River in Winnipeg, Manitoba, Canada.

In Golspie, Sutherland, a statue of George Granville Leveson-Gower, the first Duke of Sutherland, has been subject to vandalism due to his controversial role in the Sutherland Clearances.

=== Demographics ===
The diaspora was worldwide, but emigrants settled in close communities on Prince Edward Island, New Brunswick, Nova Scotia (Antigonish and Pictou counties and later in Cape Breton), the Glengarry and Kingston areas of Ontario and the Carolinas of the American colonies. Canadian Gaelic was widely spoken for some two centuries. One estimate of Nova Scotia's population has 50,000 Gaels immigrating from Scotland between 1815 and 1870. At the beginning of the 20th century, there were an estimated 100,000 Gaelic speakers in Cape Breton.

== See also ==
- Crofting
- Crofters Holdings (Scotland) Act 1886
- Enclosure
- Clan MacDonell of Glengarry
- Rural flight
- Scottish Australians
- Scottish Americans
- Scottish Canadians
- Scottish New Zealanders
- Lowland Clearances
