= Lowland Clearances =

Displacement of farmers in Scottish Lowlands

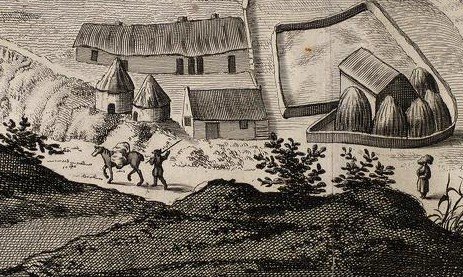
- A Scottish Lowland farm c. 1690
- Date: 1760–1830
- Cause: Scottish Agricultural Revolution
- Outcome: Thousands of cottars and tenant farmers from the southern counties of Scotland migrated from farms and small holdings they had occupied to the new industrial centres

The Lowland Clearances were one of the results of the Scottish Agricultural Revolution, which changed the traditional system of agriculture which had existed in Lowland Scotland in the seventeenth century. Thousands of cottars and tenant farmers from the southern counties (Lowlands) of Scotland migrated from farms and small holdings they had occupied to the new industrial centres of Glasgow, Edinburgh and northern England (Note: Clearances in England were more usually known as enclosure.) or abroad, or remaining upon land though adapting to the Scottish Agricultural Revolution.

== History ==
As farmland became more commercialised in Scotland during the 18th century, land was often rented through auctions. This led to an inflation of rents that priced many tenants out of the market. Furthermore, changes in agricultural practice meant the replacement of part-time labourer or subtenants (known as cottars, cottagers, or bondsmen) with full-time agricultural labourers who lived either on the main farm or in rented accommodation in growing or newly founded villages. This led many contemporary writers and modern historians to associate the Agricultural Revolution with the disappearance of cottars and their way of life from many parts of the southern Scotland.

Many small settlements were torn down, their occupants forced either to the new purpose-built villages built by the landowners such as John Cockburn of Ormiston to house the displaced cottars on the outskirts of the new ranch-style farms, or to the new industrial centres of Glasgow, Edinburgh or northern England. In other areas, such as the southwest, landowners offered low rents and nearby employment to tenants they deemed to be respectable. Between 1760 and 1830, many tens of thousands of Lowland Scots emigrated mainly within Lowland Scotland, with some taking advantage of the many new opportunities offered in Canada to own and farm their own land. Most chose to remain, by choice, some out of an inability to secure transatlantic passage, or because of obligations in Scotland.

== See also ==
- Highland Clearances
