= Patrick Bell =

Scottish minister and inventor (1799–1869)

Patrick Bell (12 May 1799 – 22 April 1869) was a Church of Scotland minister and inventor.

== Biography ==
Born in the rural parish of Auchterhouse in Angus, Scotland, into a farming family, Bell chose to study divinity at the University of St Andrews. He was Carmyllie parish minister from 1843 until his death.

== The Reaping Machine ==
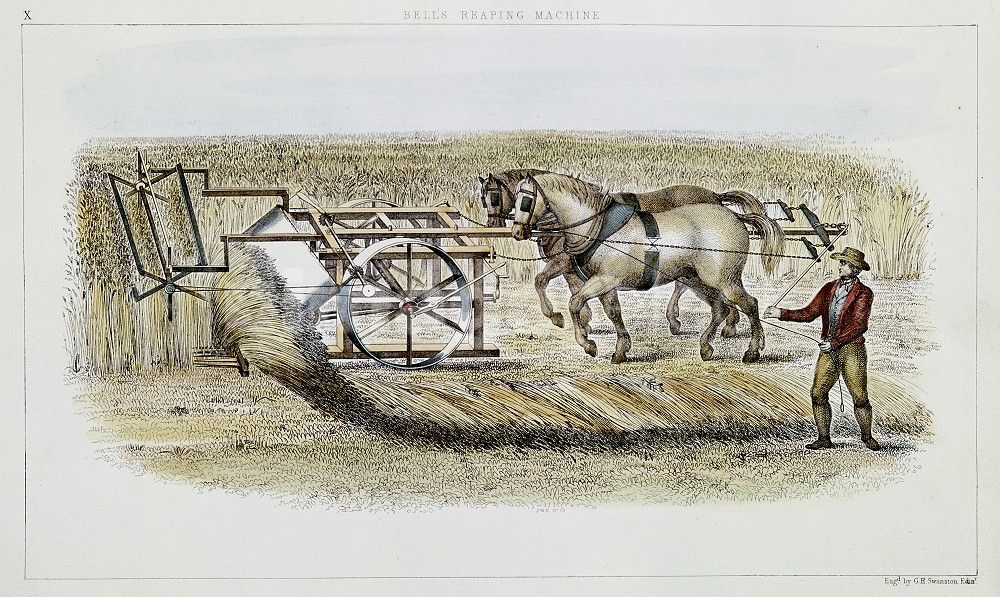
1851 illustration showing two horses pushing a Bell reaper

Bell invented the reaping machine while working on his father's farm. His interest in mechanics led him to work on a horse powered mechanical reaper for speeding up the harvest. In 1828 his machine was used with success on his father's farm and others in the district.

This reaping machine used a revolving 12 vane reel to pull the crop over the cutting knife, that was made from triangular reciprocating blades over fixed triangular blades. A canvas conveyor moved the grain and stalks to the side in a windrow. This machine was pushed by livestock and ran on 2 wheels.

Bell never sought a patent for his reaping machine. Being a man of God, he believed his invention should benefit all mankind. Therefore, he never made any financial gain from its success throughout the world.

On May 3, 1831, a patent was issued in the United States to William Manning for the reaper of essentially the same design. On December 31, 1833, a similar cutter patent was issued to Obed Hussey. A vibrating cutter was patented by Cyrus McCormick on June 21, 1834. McCormick with his brothers mass-produced the machines and developed what became the International Harvester Company.
