= Cotter (farmer) =

Peasant farmer

Cotter, cottier, cottar, Kosatter or Kötter is a term for a peasant farmer. Cotters occupied cottages and cultivated small land lots. A cottar or cottier is also a term for a tenant who was renting land from a farmer or landlord.

== England ==
The word cotter is often employed to translate the cotarius recorded in the Domesday Book, a social class whose exact status has been the subject of some discussion among historians, and is still a matter of doubt. According to Domesday, the cotarii were comparatively few, numbering fewer than seven thousand people. They were scattered unevenly throughout England, located principally in the counties of Southern England. They either cultivated a small plot of land or worked on the holdings of the villani. Like the villani, among whom they were frequently classed, their economic condition may be described as free in relation to everyone except their lord.

== Scotland ==
Cottars (Note: Cottar is the preferred spelling for Scotland.) were between a third and a half of the rural population of the Scottish Lowlands for the 17th and most of the 18th century. They held small amounts of land from lease-holding farming tenants of the traditional fermetouns. They provided labour, especially at the peak times of ploughing and harvest, in lieu of monetary rent. Many were also engaged in trades, such as weaving, or blacksmithing. The agricultural improvement that transformed the rural economy of the Lowlands in the 18th century, created larger farms with fewer tenants. From the 1770s onwards, this left no place for the cottar: many migrated to the nearby developing industrial towns, others became farm servants or day labourers for the new larger farms.

Highland Cottars (including on the islands, such as Mull) were affected by the Industrial Revolution. Landowners realized that they could make more money from sheep, whose wool was spun and processed into textiles for export, than crops. The landowners raised rents to unaffordable prices or evicted entire villages in what became known as the Highland Clearances. This resulted in the mass exodus of peasants and cotters, leading to an influx of former cotters into industrial centres, such as a burgeoning Glasgow.

Cottars were often idealised in Scottish pastoral poetry of the 18th century, such as "The Cotter's Saturday Night" by Robert Burns and "The Farmer's Ingle" by Robert Fergusson.

== Germany ==
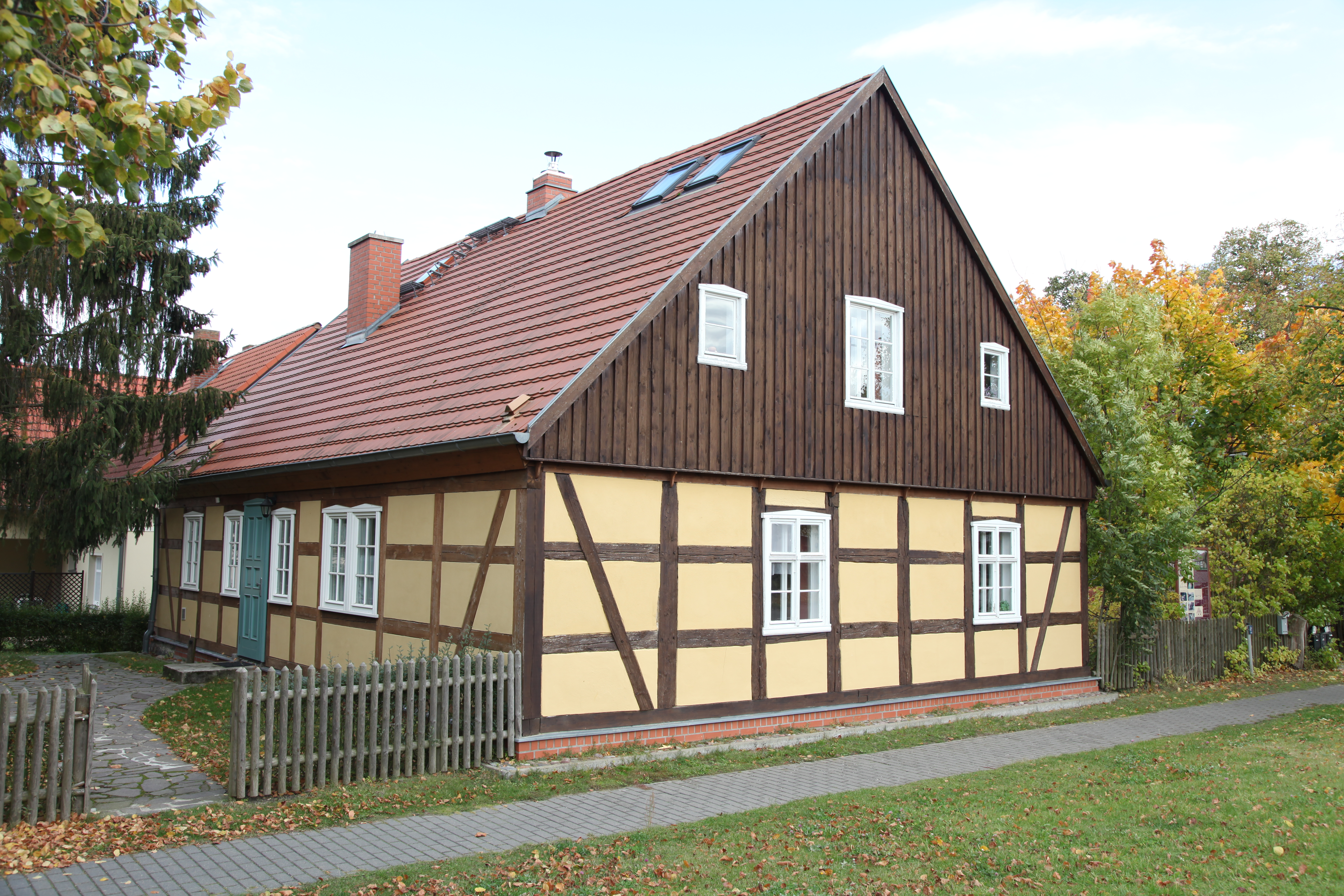
The home (Kotten) of a Kossäten in Wuthenow in eastern Germany

A Kö(t)ter, Köt(h)ner, Kätner, singular and plural forms are identical, or Kotsasse(n [pl.]), and especially in Prussia and Mecklenburg also Kossat(h)e(n [pl.]), Kosatter (sg./pl.) or Kossäte(n [pl.]), was a villager in medieval Europe who lived in a simple dwelling known as a Kate(n [pl.]) or Kotten (sg./pl.) ("cottage"). The term Kötter is recorded in Germany from the 14th century. The term Kossäte is derived from Low German and translates "who sits in a cottage". Cotter houses (Kate or Kotten) were detached houses near German villages, used as homes and workshops. Many of these Kotten/Cotter houses still remain.

The farmsteads of Kötter were generally sited on the edge of a village or were sub-divisions of an old farm. Because the return on their land was frequently insufficient to sustain their livelihood, they usually supplemented their income with a craft or trade, or by working as day labourers (Tagelöhner) on bigger farms or at manor houses. They usually had a plot of land between an eighth and a half an oxgang (Hufe); they had few cattle and no more than one horse.

In return for the grant of a house and a plot of land for his own use, a Kossät not only had to pay interest in cash or in-kind (e.g. of chickens or grain), but also had to render services in the form of manual labour or provision of draught animals and harnesses, i.e. to assist with the harvest, etc.

— historische-berufe.de

In most cases, the cottage or Kate had a small vegetable garden that also provided a secondary source of income. Most Kätner had another main occupation. They were e. g. teachers, craftsmen or, if their land was sufficient, farmers. Their land was beyond the fields (Flur) allocated to the full-time farmers or Hufnern. The Kötter usually had a small share in the common land.

In the social agricultural hierarchy a Kötter ranked below the full-time farmer or Vollbauer, but above the Büdner, who just owned a house and garden and earned his living as a tradesman, and above the various categories of day labourer (the Inste and the Tagelöhner).

Around the middle of the 15th century, encouraged by a form of primogeniture known as the Anerbenrecht and by the rapid population growth, the Kötter were divided into Erbkötter and Markkötter. The former, who normally arose as a result of the division of land, always had a house and garden within the village, or within a farming community, something which was considered essential for reasons of protection and mutual assistance. Now, land that could be farmed, no matter how poor, was cleared elsewhere in the parish; often miles away from the village or nearest settlement, and in its middle, a so-called Markkotten was built which was allocated to the Markkötter where he had to live. The Markkötter was not really given an inheritance proper and he ranked below the Erbkötter. Unlike the heirs or old farmers (Altbauern), none of this group inherited the family farm. Both groups of Kötter - the Erbkötter and Markkötter - were still higher in the social hierarchy than the Heuerling, who were, legally and economically, more dependent on the owners of their cottages.

== Poland ==
The Polish equivalent of the cotter (at least to the 19th century) was the Pachciarz krów. The term translates as "Cow tenant". One of the functions of the Pachciarz krów was to supply the landowner with milk and other bovine produce.

== Ireland ==
One definition of cottier in Ireland (c. 1700–1850) was a person who rented a simple cabin and between one and one and a half acres of land upon which to grow potatoes, oats, and possibly flax. The ground was held on a year-to-year basis and rent was often paid in labour. Usually, the land available to the cottier class was land that the owners considered unprofitable for any other use.

The cottier existed at subsistence level because of high rents and the competition for land and labour. The more prosperous cottier worked for his landlord and received cash after rent and other expenses were deducted. There was no incentive to improve a land holding, as any such improvement usually prompted a rent increase.

During the early decades of the nineteenth century, the situation for cottiers worsened considerably as the population continued to expand. This way of life was brought abruptly to a close by the effects of the potato blight, which resulted in death by starvation and disease of many peasants, with consequent depopulation, of the Great Famine of 1845–49. After the Famine, the cottier class almost completely disappeared.

== See also ==
- Serfdom
- Enclosure - the term used for clearances in England.
