= Land reform in Scotland =

Ongoing political and legal process in Scotland

Land reform in Scotland is the ongoing process by which the ownership of land, its distribution and the law which governs it is modified, reformed and modernised by property and regulatory law.

== Land ownership in Scotland ==
Scotland's land issues are rooted in two processes that happened in the 18th and 19th centuries, especially in the Scottish Highlands:

- Enclosures: landlords took control of the common lands under their regime, made them their private property, and excluded their tenants from using them.
- Highland Clearances: many landlords forcibly evicted their tenant farmers from their lands, in order to use their lands for more profitable businesses. Other Gaels were transplanted to smaller plots on less productive land, or forced to leave by increasing rents. The Clearances created strong anti-landlord sentiments among the displaced and remaining inhabitants.

As a result of these processes, there was a severe concentration of land ownership which continues today. According to some estimates, 432 families own half the private lands in Scotland, and just over 1,200 landowners hold two-thirds of Scotland's lands.

The Crofters' Holdings (Scotland) Act 1886 (49 & 50 Vict. c. 29) gave crofters in the north and west of Scotland substantial security of occupation of their crofts. Further legislation since, the Crofting Act 1993, means that the landlords of crofts have very limited rights and being the tenant of a croft is a much more valuable right than being the owner.

In Scotland, land reform aims to balance the land-ownership situation by securing the rights of access to common land, protecting the rights of tenants and small farmers, and helping small farmers and communities to buy land from large landowners.

== Devolution and Labour Government (1997–2007) ==
In 1997 a Labour Government was elected to the UK Parliament on a manifesto which included both devolution and land reform. Upon election, a land reform policy group (LRPG) was established under the chairmanship of Lord Sewel, then Scottish Office Minister of State, who was also tasked with steering devolution legislation though the House of Lords. Policy proposals and an extensive public consultation were published by the LRPG in 1999, the same year that the first elections to the newly devolved Scottish parliament returned a Labour and Liberal Democrat coalition. Following the momentum of the 1997 and 1999 elections, devolution and the LRPG's proposals, land reform progressed rapidly in the first session of the Scottish parliament with bills introduced to abolish Scotland's feudal land tenure system and a draft land reform bill introduced in 2000. The same year, the Scottish Land Fund was created and in 2001 began allocating its £10 million budget of National Lottery funding to assist rural communities to purchase land.

=== Abolition of feudal tenure ===
The first piece of land reform legislation in the 21st century, the Abolition of Feudal Tenure etc. (Scotland) Act 2000, was passed by the Scottish Parliament on 3 May 2000 and received royal assent on 9 June the same year. The act formed the core of a three-part reform of Scottish property law, alongside the Title Conditions (Scotland) Act 2003 and Tenements (Scotland) Act 2004. The main provisions of the act included the abolition of feudal superiorities and tenure, to be replaced by a system of outright ownership in which those who had been vassals became outright owners. This necessitated the extinction of superiors’ rights to collect feu duties, for which they were entitled to compensation in the form of a single payment of a size that, when invested at an annual rate of 2.5%, would yield interest equal to the former feu duty. However, as Scotland's remaining feu duties had been fixed many years previously, inflation meant that by the time of the act's passing their value was, in most cases, effectively nominal. The act also extinguished superiors’ rights to enforce real burdens – conditions on the holding of land – retaining only those conditions enforceable by neighbouring land owners or by certain legal bodies on public policy grounds. The legal basis of real burdens and title conditions was then reformulated in the Title Conditions (Scotland) Act 2003. The end of feudal tenure simplified titles to land, while the subsequent Title Conditions (Scotland) Act 2003 modernised the types of interests and conditions that could be attached to those titles. Finally, common law surrounding tenements was then reformed in light of these changes under the Tenements (Scotland) Act 2004, completing the abolition of Scotland's feudal property system.

=== 2003 acts ===
2003 saw two important pieces of legislation passed by the Scottish parliament: the Land Reform (Scotland) Act 2003 and the Agricultural Holdings (Scotland) Act 2003. The Land Reform (Scotland) Act 2003 has three parts, with provisions regarding three areas of land rights in Scotland: the creation of a legal framework for land access, the community right to buy and the crofting community right to buy.

The first part formalises the tradition in Scotland of unhindered access to open countryside. It creates a framework for responsible access to land and inland water, provided that care is taken not to cause damage or interfere with activities including farming and game stalking. Access rights apply to any non-motorised activities, including walking, cycling, horse-riding and wild camping. They also allow access on inland water for canoeing, rowing, sailing and swimming. This aspect of the act follows the distinctive approach set out in the Scottish Outdoor Access Code, specifying the rights and responsibilities of land managers, countryside users and recreational managers. Similar legislation was passed for England and Wales with the Countryside and Rights of Way Act 2000.

The second part of the act establishes the community right to buy, allowing communities with populations of up to 10,000 to register an interest in land, entitling them to right of first refusal should the owner put the land up for sale or intend to transfer ownership, provided a representative community body can be formed to carry out the purchase.

Finally, the third part establishes the crofting community right to buy, which allows crofting communities to purchase crofts and associated land from existing landowners. It differs from the community right to buy in that it can be exercised at any time, regardless of whether the land has been put on the market, allowing crofting communities to purchase land even in the absence of a willing seller.

The Agricultural Holdings (Scotland) Act 2003 amends the law relating to agricultural holdings under the Agricultural Holdings (Scotland) Act 1991. It provides for new forms of agricultural tenancies and makes provision in relation to these tenancies, the right of certain agricultural tenants to buy land and the use of certain agricultural land for non-agricultural purposes. It makes special provision for certain agricultural tenancies where the tenant is a partnership and for the resolution of disputes between landlords and tenants arising under agricultural tenancies.

== SNP government (2007–present) ==
The May 2007 Scottish Parliament election resulted, for the first time, in a Scottish National Party (SNP) minority government. Its first term was marked by a lack of action on land reform. However, following re-election in 2011, this time with a parliamentary majority, it returned to the government agenda. In 2012, the Scottish Government established the Land Reform Review Group; in 2013, First Minister Alex Salmond announced a target of seeing 1,000,000 acres (400,000 ha) of land in community ownership by 2020. The Land Reform Review Group was tasked with identifying how land reform would enable rural and urban communities to: have a stake in the ownership, governance, management and use of land; assist in the acquisition and management of that land; and promote new relationships between land, people, economy and environment in Scotland. Its final report, published in May 2014, recommended policies to modernise and diversify land ownership in Scotland and encourage sustainable development, some of which would form the basis of the Community Empowerment (Scotland) Act 2015 and Land Reform (Scotland) Act 2016.

During this period the Registration etc. (Scotland) Act 2012 introduced changes to the conveyancing system in Scotland, with the aim of having all land in Scotland registered under the Land Register of Scotland within 10 years. Prior to the act, entry of land into the register would be prompted by a sale but other transfers of land would not prompt first entry. The act expanded the triggers for first entry to include any transfer of property or the signing of a long lease in order to accelerate the transition from the antiquated, deed-based Register of Sasines to the modernised, map-based Land Register.

=== Salvesen v Riddell case (2012–2013) ===
In 2012, a section of the Agricultural Holdings (Scotland) Act 2003 was challenged and suspended by the UK Supreme Court. The trigger for this ruling was an appeal by Salvesen, the owner of Peaston Farm near Ormiston. The Riddells were tenants in this farm and on a fixed term "limited partnership" tenancy. The original bill in the Scottish Parliament limited the ability of landowners to terminate such tenancies. Initially, the start date of this restriction was set to 4 February 2003. This led many landlords, including Salvesen, to terminate the tenancies of their tenants the day before – 3 February 2003. A later amendment to section 72 retroactively set the start date of the restrictions to 16 September 2002, which made Salvesen's termination notice ineffective: instead of the tenancy being for a fixed period, it could become a tenancy that could last indefinitely after the end of the agreed period, thus completely altering the original deal between them.

Salvesen applied to the Land Court, which rejected his application. He then appealed to the Court of Session and obtained permission to apply to the UK Supreme Court. His main claim was that section 72 was incompatible with his property rights, guaranteed by article 1 of the European Convention on Human Rights. The Supreme Court unanimously allowed the appeal. It found that Salvesen's rights under article 1 were violated by section 72(10) of the 2003 act and that the provision was outside the legislative competence of the Scottish Parliament under the Scotland Act 1998.

=== Community Empowerment (Scotland) Act 2015 ===
The Community Empowerment (Scotland) Act 2015 marked the first major piece of land reform legislation to be passed under the SNP government. Its provisions covered different areas pertaining to community empowerment and public participation in policy and planning, including several related directly to land. The most important of these was the extension of the community right to buy to communities of any size, including, for the first time, those in urban areas. It also introduced a new community right to buy land which is abandoned, neglected or causing harm to the environmental wellbeing of the community. Similarly to the crofting community right to buy introduced in 2003, this new right did not require a willing seller. Rather, Scottish ministers could compel a landowner to sell to communities with a registered interest, if they deem the sale likely to contribute to sustainable local development.

Further provisions granted community bodies the right to request to purchase, lease, manage or use land and buildings held by local authorities, Scottish ministers and other Scottish public bodies, of which relevant authorities are required to create and maintain a publicly available register. The act reformed Common Good Property, requiring local authorities to establish and maintain registers of all common good property held by them, and to inform and consult local community bodies before any change of use or disposal.

It also set a requirement for local authorities to take steps to provide allotments should waiting lists exceed certain lengths. Furthermore, it strengthened protections for allotments, regulated rents and allowed tenants to sell food produced on allotments on a not-for-profit basis. The act required that local authorities develop food-growing strategies, including the identification of land that may be used as allotment sites or potential land for community cultivation.

It has been found that the Scottish approach to community empowerment and localism marks an example of policy divergence from the rest of the UK, but that significant challenges remain in how to ensure a shared strategy, shared resources, and shared accountability.

=== Land Reform (Scotland) Act 2016 ===
In 2013, Richard Lochhead, then Cabinet Secretary for Rural Affairs and the Environment, announced the launch of the Agricultural Holdings Review, which would examine the situation of land ownership and use, tenant-owner relationships, and all relevant legislation. The review published its final report in January 2015, and the recommendations were put out to consultation.

Following the responses to the consultation, the Scottish Government presented the "Land Reform (Scotland) Bill" to the Scottish Parliament on 22 June 2015. The bill was passed by the Scottish Parliament on 16 March 2016, and received royal assent on 22 March 2016, becoming the Land Reform (Scotland) Act 2016. The most radical and controversial provision of the act was the creation of the community right to buy for sustainable development. This permitted Scottish Ministers to approve the purchase of privately owned land by a community body with a registered interest. Like the crofting community right to buy and the community right to buy abandoned or derelict land, it does not require a willing seller but allows ministers to compel landowners to sell if they decide that the sale will further sustainable development in the area. Community bodies may also register an interest in allowing a third party to purchase land on the same basis.

This new community right to buy was not the only provision of the act. The act required that the Scottish Government produce a 'Land Rights and Responsibilities Statement', setting out its objectives for land reform, and to establish a Scottish Land Commission to take forward the land reform process and prepare a strategic plan, for the approval of Scottish Ministers. Other provisions of the act included: new regulations to require persons who control land to be identified, with information obtained to appear in the Land Register of Scotland; the removal of sporting rights exemption from rates, are to be re-valued; and further powers for Scottish Natural Heritage to control deer management. It also makes provision for notice and consultation where core paths are to be amended.

Further provisions of the act pertain to agricultural tenancies, including new protections for tenant farmers against eviction, the introduction of a modernised limited-duration tenancy with greater rights for tenants relative to landowners, and the widening of eligible assignees and inheritors of tenancies. Additionally, tenants under the Agricultural Holdings (Scotland) Act 1991 are now presumed to have registered their right to buy.

Since 2012 statistics for agricultural land occupation have been published on an annual basis for Scotland by the Central Association of Agricultural Valuers. The 2019 figures indicate low levels of letting activity and that much relet land is bare, without buildings or investment by the landlord.

== Criticism ==
=== By landlords ===
In August 2013, landowners including the Duke of Roxburghe expressed concerns about the work of the land reform review group and the focus on community ownership. The landowners stated that private ownership brought efficiency and greater protection for endangered species from development of land. Also, there were other social, economic, and environmental benefits to private ownership of Scottish land. The Duke of Roxburghe raised concerns specifically about the economic impacts, and the impact on the agricultural sector, saying:

Radical proposals that threaten private property rights and which impact adversely on private enterprise, investment and development or which deprive young aspiring farmers the opportunity to get a firm foothold on the farming ladder would be immensely damaging in our view and act against the interests of the communities involved.

— Duke of Roxburghe, August 2013, quoted in The Scotsman newspaper

Many other landlords opposed the passage of the Land Reform (Scotland) Act 2016. Mark Coombs, the estate manager of the 33,000 ha (82,000 acres) Queensberry Estate, owned by the 10th Duke of Buccleuch, stated that "there are also concerns if the purpose of changing the ownership is simply to allow another party ... to carry out the same activity as is currently being undertaken by the existing owner as this strikes at the essence of ownership rights and suggests a clear move towards a more collectivist political view which is not representative of the body politic of Scotland", thus hurting the property rights of the landowners since it strips them of control of their property.

David Johnstone, chairman of Scottish Land and Estates, said the proposal could lead to land not being made available to let, and hurting the tenant farming sector. Johnstone said: "What you are doing is giving a tenant a stake in the capital value of the farm. If the landlord doesn’t have the ability to pay, then the farm never comes back... That has got to have a knock on effect in the confidence of anyone who might wish to come to let land or is letting land at the moment."

Seafield and Strathspey Estates argued that land concentration is not a bad thing, as it may lead to more efficient management. Seafield and Strathspey Estates is a 35,000 ha (86,000 acres) enterprise which includes salmon beats on the River Spey, and is managed on behalf of the family of the Earl of Seafield. It said landowners were being blamed for the inefficiencies of local and central government. "There is a myth presented by individuals sponsoring land reform in Scotland that 'too many acres are owned by too few individuals.' It may be true that 'many acres are owned by few individuals' but there is very little evidence presented to show that this is a bad thing".

=== By Scottish Parliament ===
The Land Reform (Scotland) Bill was criticised during its passage by the Delegated Powers and Law Reform Committee of the Scottish Parliament on the basis that it granted a significant power to Scottish Ministers to implement much of the details of the act through secondary legislation and delegated powers. Turcan Connell identified concerns around the implementation of the act and the amount of scrutiny the detailed law would receive.

=== Recommendations by legal experts ===
Several parts of the bill have been criticised as follows:

- The criteria for community buyout (s.47) are too demanding. There are double criteria: significant benefit from the transfer, and significant harm from non-transfer. Each one of these criteria alone should be sufficient.
- The upper bound of 10 years on tenancy (part 10, s.74) is too short and hurts the rights of the tenants.
- The paragraphs on transparency and accountability (parts 3–4, s.35-36) are too weak: there are no sanctions on refusing to give information about the landowner, and there is no obligation to give information on the real person owning the land (the real landowner often hides behind a "shell company").

Land-reform activists claim that the current reform is insufficient as several important amendments were voted down by SNP and Conservative backbenchers, including:

- Land cap – restricting the amount of land that one individual can own.
- Preventing land ownership via offshore tax havens. Andy Wightman, the land reform spokesperson for the Scottish Greens and MSP candidate for Lothian, revealed that companies owned by the Buccleuch Estates used tax havens in the Cayman Islands. He said that "[t]he Green bid to clamp down on the use of tax havens goes to the heart of understanding who owns Scotland. As we have seen this week with the uncovering of the complex corporate affairs of the Buccleuch Estates, there is an urgent need to ensure transparency in who profits from Scottish land."

In a 2016 article in the journal of the Law Society of Scotland, Douglas Maxwell claims the Land Reform (Scotland) Bill contains poorly defined terms such as "sustainable development" and "communities" which may place the bill in conflict with international human rights laws, particularly the ECHR Protocol 1, article 1.

== Community focus ==
Land reform in Scotland is unusual in its emphasis on community land ownership, with the Scottish Government adopting the target of seeing 1,000,000 acres (400,000 ha) of land under community ownership by 2020. Most other land reforms have focused on giving land ownership rights to individual farmers. In contrast, the land reform acts of 2003 and 2016 grant a collective right-to-buy to entire communities living in a geographical area.

== See also ==
- Scottish Land Court
- Lands Tribunal for Scotland
- Registers of Scotland
- Scottish Land Restoration League
- Highland Land League
- Scottish Land Fund
- List of community buyouts in Scotland
- Right of public access to the wilderness
- Community ownership
- Community Land Scotland
- Land raid
