= List of Scottish statutory instruments, 2004 =

This is a complete list of Scottish statutory instruments in 2004.

== 1-100 ==
- Shetland Islands Regulated Fishery (Scotland) Variation Order 2004 (S.S.I. 2004/1)
- Ura Firth, Shetland Scallops Several Fishery Order 2004 (S.S.I. 2004/5)
- Meat Products (Scotland) Regulations 2004 (S.S.I. 2004/6)
- Infant Formula and Follow-on Formula Amendment (Scotland) Regulations 2004 (S.S.I. 2004/7)
- Processed Cereal-based Foods and Baby Foods for Infants and Young Children (Scotland) Regulations 2004 (S.S.I. 2004/8)
- Welfare of Animals (Slaughter or Killing) Amendment (Scotland) Regulations 2004 (S.S.I. 2004/13)
- Local Government Finance (Scotland) Order 2004 (S.S.I. 2004/14)
- National Health Service (Transfer of Property between Health Boards) (Scotland) Regulations 2004 (S.S.I. 2004/15)
- National Health Service (Borrowing and Loans from Endowments) (Scotland) Regulations 2004 (S.S.I. 2004/16)
- Food Protection (Emergency Prohibitions) (Amnesic Shellfish Poisoning) (East Coast) (No. 4) (Scotland) Order 2003 Revocation Order 2004 (S.S.I. 2004/19)
- Food Protection (Emergency Prohibitions) (Amnesic Shellfish Poisoning) (West Coast) (Scotland) Order 2004 (S.S.I. 2004/21)
- Food Protection (Emergency Prohibitions) (Amnesic Shellfish Poisoning) (West Coast) (No. 2) (Scotland) Order 2003 Revocation Order 2004 (S.S.I. 2004/22)
- Solvent Emissions (Scotland) Regulations 2004 (S.S.I. 2004/26)
- Registration of Establishments Keeping Laying Hens (Scotland) Amendment Regulations 2004 (S.S.I. 2004/27)
- Local Government in Scotland Act 2003 (Commencement No. 2) Order 2004 (S.S.I. 2004/28)
- Local Government Capital Expenditure Limits (Scotland) Regulations 2004 (S.S.I. 2004/29)
- Health Act 1999 (Savings) (Scotland) Order 2004 (S.S.I. 2004/31)
- Health Act 1999 (Commencement No. 14) (Scotland) Order 2004 (S.S.I. 2004/32)
- Community Care and Health (Scotland) Act 2002 (Commencement No. 3) Order 2004 (S.S.I. 2004/33)
- Community Care and Health (Scotland) Act 2002 (Savings) Order 2004 (S.S.I. 2004/34)
- National Health Service (General Ophthalmic Services) (Scotland) Amendment Regulations 2004 (S.S.I. 2004/36)
- National Health Service (General Dental Services) (Scotland) Amendment Regulations 2004 (S.S.I. 2004/37)
- National Health Service (Tribunal) (Scotland) Regulations 2004 (S.S.I. 2004/38)
- National Health Service (Pharmaceutical Services) (Scotland) Amendment Regulations 2004 (S.S.I. 2004/39)
- National Health Service (General Medical Services Supplementary Lists) (Scotland) Amendment Regulations 2004 (S.S.I. 2004/40)
- National Health Service (General Medical Services) (Scotland) Amendment Regulations 2004 (S.S.I. 2004/41)
- Food Protection (Emergency Prohibitions) (Amnesic Shellfish Poisoning) (West Coast) (No. 4) (Scotland) Partial Revocation Order 2004 (S.S.I. 2004/42)
- Food Protection (Emergency Prohibitions) (Amnesic Shellfish Poisoning) (West Coast) (No. 2) (Scotland) Order 2004 (S.S.I. 2004/43)
- Sea Fishing (Restriction on Days at Sea) (Scotland) Order 2004 (S.S.I. 2004/44)
- Public Appointments and Public Bodies etc. (Scotland) Act 2003 (Commencement No. 4) Amendment Order 2004 (S.S.I. 2004/45)
- Scottish Hospital Trust (Transfer of Property) Regulations 2004 (S.S.I. 2004/46)
- National Health Service (Distribution of Endowment Income Scheme) (Scotland) Regulations 2004 (S.S.I. 2004/47)
- Food Protection (Emergency Prohibitions) (Radioactivity in Sheep) Partial Revocation (Scotland) Order 2004 (S.S.I. 2004/48)
- Advice and Assistance (Scotland) Amendment Regulations 2004 (S.S.I. 2004/49)
- Civil Legal Aid (Scotland) Amendment Regulations 2004 (S.S.I. 2004/50)
- Criminal Legal Aid (Fixed Payments) (Scotland) Amendment Regulations 2004 (S.S.I. 2004/51)
- Act of Sederunt (Rules of the Court of Session Amendment) (Miscellaneous) 2004 (S.S.I. 2004/52)
- Motorways Traffic (Scotland) Amendment Regulations 2004 (S.S.I. 2004/53)
- A1 (East of Haddington to Dunbar) Special Road Regulations 2004 (S.S.I. 2004/54)
- Sea Fish (Prohibited Methods of Fishing) (Firth of Clyde) Order 2004 (S.S.I. 2004/55)
- Food (Chilli and Chilli Products) (Emergency Control) (Scotland) Regulations 2004 (S.S.I. 2004/56)
- Private Hire Vehicles (Carriage of Guide Dogs etc.) Act 2002 (Commencement No. 1) (Scotland) Order 2004 (S.S.I. 2004/57)
- Primary Medical Services (Scotland) Act 2004 (Commencement) Order 2004 (S.S.I. 2004/58)
- Non-Domestic Rate (Scotland) Order 2004 (S.S.I. 2004/59)
- Housing Revenue Account General Fund Contribution Limits (Scotland) Order 2004 (S.S.I. 2004/60)
- Food Protection (Emergency Prohibitions) (Amnesic Shellfish Poisoning) (West Coast) (No. 5) (Scotland) Order 2003 Partial Revocation Order 2004 (S.S.I. 2004/61)
- National Health Service Superannuation Scheme (Scotland) (Additional Voluntary Contributions) Amendment Regulations 2004 (S.S.I. 2004/62)
- Food Protection (Emergency Prohibitions) (Amnesic Shellfish Poisoning) (West Coast) (No. 4) (Scotland) Partial Revocation (No. 2) Order 2004 (S.S.I. 2004/65)
- National Health Service (Charges for Drugs and Appliances) (Scotland) Amendment Regulations 2004 (S.S.I. 2004/66)
- Domestic Water and Sewerage Charges (Reduction) (Scotland) Regulations 2004 (S.S.I. 2004/68)
- Food Protection (Emergency Prohibitions) (Amnesic Shellfish Poisoning) (West Coast) (No. 4) (Scotland) Partial Revocation (No. 3) Order 2004 (S.S.I. 2004/69)
- Less Favoured Area Support Scheme (Scotland) Regulations 2004 (S.S.I. 2004/70)
- Road Traffic (NHS Charges) Amendment (Scotland) Regulations 2004 (S.S.I. 2004/76)
- Food Protection (Emergency Prohibitions) (Amnesic Shellfish Poisoning) (West Coast) (No. 3) (Scotland) Order 2003 Revocation Order 2004 (S.S.I. 2004/79)
- Sea Fishing (Restriction on Days at Sea) (Scotland) Amendment Order 2004 (S.S.I. 2004/81)
- Individual Learning Account (Scotland) Regulations 2004 (S.S.I. 2004/83)
- Road Works (Inspection Fees) (Scotland) Amendment Regulations 2004 (S.S.I. 2004/84)
- Parking Attendants (Wearing of Uniforms) (Dundee City Council Parking Area) Regulations 2004 (S.S.I. 2004/85)
- Road Traffic (Parking Adjudicators) (Dundee City Council) Regulations 2004 (S.S.I. 2004/86)
- Road Traffic (Permitted Parking Area and Special Parking Area) (Dundee City Council) Designation Order 2004 (S.S.I. 2004/87)
- Private Hire Car Drivers' Licences (Carrying of Guide Dogs and Hearing Dogs) (Scotland) Regulations 2004 (S.S.I. 2004/88)
- Teachers' Superannuation (Scotland) Amendment Regulations 2004 (S.S.I. 2004/89)
- Food for Particular Nutritional Uses (Addition of Substances for Specific Nutritional Purposes) (Scotland) Amendment Regulations 2004 (S.S.I. 2004/90)
- Non-Domestic Rating (Rural Areas and Rateable Value Limits) (Scotland) Amendment Order 2004 (S.S.I. 2004/91)
- Non-Domestic Rates (Levying) (Scotland) Regulations 2004 (S.S.I. 2004/92)
- Regulation of Care (Fees) (Scotland) Order 2004 (S.S.I. 2004/93)
- The Regulation of Care (Requirements as to Care Services) (Scotland) Amendment Regulations 2004 (S.S.I. 2004/94)
- The Regulation of Care (Applications and Provision of Advice) (Scotland) Amendment Order 2004 (S.S.I. 2004/95)
- Regulation of Care (Registration and Registers) (Scotland) Amendment Regulations 2004 (S.S.I. 2004/96)
- National Health Service (Optical Charges and Payments) (Scotland) Amendment Regulations 2004 (S.S.I. 2004/97)
- National Health Service (General Ophthalmic Services) (Scotland) Amendment (No. 2) Regulations 2004 (S.S.I. 2004/98)
- Regulation of Care (Scotland) Act 2001 (Commencement No. 5 and Transitional Provisions) Order 2004 (S.S.I. 2004/100)

== 101-200 ==
- National Health Service (Dental Charges) (Scotland) Amendment Regulations 2004 (S.S.I. 2004/101)
- National Health Service (Travelling Expenses and Remission of Charges) (Scotland) Amendment Regulations 2004 (S.S.I. 2004/102)
- National Assistance (Assessment of Resources) Amendment (Scotland) Regulations 2004 (S.S.I. 2004/103)
- Pesticides (Maximum Residue Levels in Crops, Food and Feeding Stuffs) (Scotland) Amendment Regulations 2004 (S.S.I. 2004/104)
- Housing (Scotland) Act 2001 (Alteration of Housing Finance Arrangements) Order 2004 (S.S.I. 2004/105)
- National Assistance (Sums for Personal Requirements) (Scotland) Regulations 2004 (S.S.I. 2004/106)
- National Health Service Trusts (Dissolution) (Scotland) Order 2004 (S.S.I. 2004/107)
- Housing (Scotland) Act 2001 (Payments out of Grants for Housing Support Services) Amendment Order 2004 (S.S.I. 2004/108)
- Rural Stewardship Scheme (Scotland) Amendment Regulations 2004 (S.S.I. 2004/109)
- Pollution Prevention and Control (Scotland) Amendment Regulations 2004 (S.S.I. 2004/110)
- Potatoes Originating in Egypt (Scotland) Regulations 2004 (S.S.I. 2004/111)
- Special Waste Amendment (Scotland) Regulations 2004 (S.S.I. 2004/112)
- Countryside Premium Scheme (Scotland) Amendment Regulations 2004 (S.S.I. 2004/113)
- National Health Service (Primary Medical Services Performers Lists) (Scotland) Regulations 2004 (S.S.I. 2004/114)
- National Health Service (General Medical Services Contracts) (Scotland) Regulations 2004 (S.S.I. 2004/115)
- National Health Service (Primary Medical Services Section 17C Agreements) (Scotland) Regulations 2004 (S.S.I. 2004/116)
- Housing (Scotland) Act 2001 (Assistance to Registered Social Landlords and Other Persons) (Grants) Regulations 2004 (S.S.I. 2004/117)
- Dairy Produce Quotas (Scotland) Amendment Regulations 2004 (S.S.I. 2004/118)
- Tribunals and Inquiries (Dairy Produce Quota Tribunal) (Scotland) Order 2004 (S.S.I. 2004/119)
- Police Grant (Scotland) Order 2004 (S.S.I. 2004/120)
- Police (Scotland) Amendment Regulations 2004 (S.S.I. 2004/121)
- National Health Service (Tribunal) (Scotland) Amendment Regulations 2004 (S.S.I. 2004/122)
- Angus Council A92 Montrose Bridge Replacement Bridge Scheme 2003 Confirmation Instrument 2004 (S.S.I. 2004/123)
- Food Protection (Emergency Prohibitions) (Amnesic Shellfish Poisoning) (West Coast) (No. 4) (Scotland) Order 2003 Revocation Order 2004 (S.S.I. 2004/124)
- Food Protection (Emergency Prohibitions) (Amnesic Shellfish Poisoning) (West Coast) (No. 6) (Scotland) Order 2003 Partial Revocation Order 2004 (S.S.I. 2004/125)
- Criminal Legal Aid (Fixed Payments) (Scotland) Amendment (No. 2) Regulations 2004 (S.S.I. 2004/126)
- Less Favoured Area Support Scheme (Scotland) Amendment Regulations 2004 (S.S.I. 2004/128)
- Food Protection (Emergency Prohibitions) (Amnesic Shellfish Poisoning) (West Coast) (No. 10) (Scotland) Order 2003 Revocation Order 2004 (S.S.I. 2004/129)
- Food Protection (Emergency Prohibitions) (Amnesic Shellfish Poisoning) (Orkney) (No. 2) (Scotland) Order 2003 Revocation Order 2004 (S.S.I. 2004/130)
- Food Protection (Emergency Prohibitions) (Amnesic Shellfish Poisoning) (West Coast) (No. 5) (Scotland) Order 2003 Revocation Order 2004 (S.S.I. 2004/131)
- Natural Mineral Water, Spring Water and Bottled Drinking Water Amendment (Scotland) Regulations 2004 (S.S.I. 2004/132)
- Jam and Similar Products (Scotland) Regulations 2004 (S.S.I. 2004/133)
- Local Government Pension Scheme (Management and Investment of Funds) (Scotland) Amendment Regulations 2004 (S.S.I. 2004/134)
- Food Protection (Emergency Prohibitions) (Amnesic Shellfish Poisoning) (West Coast) (No. 8) (Scotland) Order 2003 Revocation Order 2004 (S.S.I. 2004/135)
- Sexual Offences Act 2003 (Prescribed Police Stations) (Scotland) Regulations 2004 (S.S.I. 2004/137)
- Sexual Offences Act 2003 (Commencement) (Scotland) Order 2004 (S.S.I. 2004/138)
- Food Protection (Emergency Prohibitions) (Amnesic Shellfish Poisoning) (West Coast) (No. 11) (Scotland) Order 2003 Partial Revocation Order 2004 (S.S.I. 2004/139)
- Advice and Assistance (Financial Conditions) (Scotland) Regulations 2004 (S.S.I. 2004/140)
- Civil Legal Aid (Financial Conditions) (Scotland) Regulations 2004 (S.S.I. 2004/141)
- General Medical Services (Transitional and Other Ancillary Provisions) (Scotland) Order 2004 (S.S.I. 2004/142)
- Organic Aid (Scotland) Regulations 2004 (S.S.I. 2004/143)
- Tobacco Advertising and Promotion (Point of Sale) (Scotland) Regulations 2004 (S.S.I. 2004/144)
- Local Authorities Etc. (Allowances) (Scotland) Amendment Regulations 2004 (S.S.I. 2004/146)
- Budget (Scotland) Act 2003 Amendment Order 2004 (S.S.I. 2004/147)
- Public Appointments and Public Bodies etc. (Scotland) Act 2003 (Commencement No. 5) Order 2004 (S.S.I. 2004/148)
- Act of Sederunt (Fees of Shorthand Writers in the Sheriff Court) (Amendment) 2004 (S.S.I. 2004/149)
- Act of Sederunt (Rules of the Court of Session Amendment No. 2) (Fees of Shorthand Writers) 2004 (S.S.I. 2004/150)
- Act of Sederunt (Rules of the Court of Session Amendment No. 3) (Fees of Solicitors) 2004 (S.S.I. 2004/151)
- Act of Sederunt (Fees of Solicitors and Witnesses in the Sheriff Court) (Amendment) 2004 (S.S.I. 2004/152)
- Mental Health (Care and Treatment) (Scotland) Act 2003 (Commencement No. 2) Order 2004 (S.S.I. 2004/153)
- Mental Health Tribunal for Scotland (Disqualification) Regulations 2004 (S.S.I. 2004/154)
- Mental Health Tribunal for Scotland (Appointment of President) Regulations 2004 (S.S.I. 2004/155)
- Liquor Licensing (Fees) (Scotland) Order 2004 (S.S.I. 2004/157)
- Food Protection (Emergency Prohibitions) (Amnesic Shellfish Poisoning) (West Coast) (Scotland) Revocation Order 2004 (S.S.I. 2004/159)
- Primary Medical Services (Sale of Goodwill and Restrictions on Sub-contracting) (Scotland) Regulations 2004 (S.S.I. 2004/162)
- General Medical Services and Section 17C Agreements (Transitional and other Ancillary Provisions) (Scotland) Order 2004 (S.S.I. 2004/163)
- National Health Service (Travelling Expenses and Remission of Charges) (Scotland) Amendment (No. 2) Regulations 2004 (S.S.I. 2004/166)
- Primary Medical Services (Scotland) Act 2004 (Modification of Enactments) Order 2004 (S.S.I. 2004/167)
- National Health Service (Optical Charges and Payments) (Scotland) Amendment (No. 2) Regulations 2004 (S.S.I. 2004/168)
- National Health Service (General Ophthalmic Services) (Scotland) Amendment (No. 3) Regulations 2004 (S.S.I. 2004/169)
- Renewables Obligation (Scotland) Order 2004 (S.S.I. 2004/170)
- Highland Council (Inverie) Harbour Empowerment Order 2004 (S.S.I. 2004/171)
- Housing Support Grant (Scotland) Order 2004 (S.S.I. 2004/173)
- Organic Aid (Scotland) Amendment Regulations 2004 (S.S.I. 2004/174)
- Crime (International Co-operation) Act 2003 (Commencement No. 1) (Scotland) Order 2004 (S.S.I. 2004/175)
- Crime and Punishment (Scotland) Act 1997 (Commencement No. 6 and Savings) Order 2004 (S.S.I. 2004/176)
- Food Protection (Emergency Prohibitions) (Amnesic Shellfish Poisoning) (West Coast) (No. 6) (Scotland) Order 2003 Revocation Order 2004 (S.S.I. 2004/177)
- Food Protection (Emergency Prohibitions) (Amnesic Shellfish Poisoning) (West Coast) (No. 9) (Scotland) Order 2003 Revocation Order 2004 (S.S.I. 2004/178)
- Food Protection (Emergency Prohibitions) (Amnesic Shellfish Poisoning) (West Coast) (Scotland) Order 2003 Revocation Order 2004 (S.S.I. 2004/179)
- Scottish Water (River Isla) Ordinary Drought Order 2004 (S.S.I. 2004/180)
- Food Protection (Emergency Prohibitions) (Amnesic Shellfish Poisoning) (West Coast) (No. 11) (Scotland) Order 2003 Revocation Order 2004 (S.S.I. 2004/181)
- European Communities (Services of Lawyers) Amendment (Scotland) Order 2004 (S.S.I. 2004/186)
- Food (Jelly Mini-Cups) (Emergency Control) (Scotland) Regulations 2004 (S.S.I. 2004/187)
- Home Energy Efficiency Scheme Amendment (Scotland) Regulations 2004 (S.S.I. 2004/188)
- Food Protection (Emergency Prohibitions) (Amnesic Shellfish Poisoning) (West Coast) (No. 2) (Scotland) Revocation Order 2004 (S.S.I. 2004/192)
- Supervised Attendance Order (Prescribed Courts) (Scotland) Order 2004 (S.S.I. 2004/194)
- Act of Adjournal (Criminal Procedure Rules Amendment) (Miscellaneous) 2004 (S.S.I. 2004/195)
- Act of Sederunt (Fees of Solicitors and Witnesses in the Sheriff Court) (Amendment No. 2) 2004 (S.S.I. 2004/196)
- Act of Sederunt (Ordinary Cause, Summary Application, Summary Cause and Small Claim Rules) Amendment (Miscellaneous) 2004 (S.S.I. 2004/197)
- Public Appointments and Public Bodies etc. (Scotland) Act 2003 (Commencement No. 6) Order 2004 (S.S.I. 2004/198)

== 201-300 ==
- Freedom of Information (Scotland) Act 2002 (Commencement No. 3) Order 2004 (S.S.I. 2004/203)
- Special Waste Amendment (Scotland) Amendment Regulations 2004 (S.S.I. 2004/204)
- Sexual Offences Act 2003 (Travel Notification Requirements) (Scotland) Regulations 2004 (S.S.I. 2004/205)
- Act of Adjournal (Criminal Procedure Rules Amendment No. 2) (Sexual Offences Act 2003) 2004 (S.S.I. 2004/206)
- Clydeport (Closure of Govan Basin) Harbour Revision Order 2004 (S.S.I. 2004/207)
- Feeding Stuffs (Scotland) Amendment Regulations 2004 (S.S.I. 2004/208)
- Sea Fishing (Enforcement of Community Quota and Third Country Fishing Measures) (Scotland) Order 2004 (S.S.I. 2004/209)
- Food (Emergency Control) (Scotland) (Miscellaneous Amendments) Regulations 2004 (S.S.I. 2004/210)
- Tobacco Advertising and Promotion (Specialist Tobacconist) (Scotland) Regulations 2004 (S.S.I. 2004/211)
- Primary Medical Services (Consequential and Ancillary Amendments) (Scotland) Order 2004 (S.S.I. 2004/212)
- National Health Service (General Medical Services Contracts) (Scotland) Amendment Regulations 2004 (S.S.I. 2004/215)
- National Health Service (Primary Medical Services Performers Lists) (Scotland) Amendment Regulations 2004 (S.S.I. 2004/216)
- National Health Service (Primary Medical Services Section 17C Agreements) (Scotland) Amendment Regulations 2004 (S.S.I. 2004/217)
- The Town and Country Planning (Fees for Applications and Deemed Applications) (Scotland) Regulations 2004 (S.S.I. 2004/219)
- Pesticides (Maximum Residue Levels in Crops, Food and Feeding Stuffs) (Scotland) Amendment (No. 2) Regulations 2004 (S.S.I. 2004/220)
- Food Protection (Emergency Prohibitions) (Amnesic Shellfish Poisoning) (Orkney) (Scotland) Order 2004 (S.S.I. 2004/221)
- Act of Sederunt (Summary Applications, Statutory Applications and Appeals etc. Rules) Amendment (Sexual Offences Act 2003) 2004 (S.S.I. 2004/222)
- General Medical Services and the General Medical Services and Section 17C Agreements (Transitional and Other Ancillary Provisions Orders) (Scotland) Amendment Order 2004 (S.S.I. 2004/223)
- Crofting Community Body Form of Application for Consent to Buy Croft Land etc. and Notice of Minister's Decision (Scotland) Regulations 2004 (S.S.I. 2004/224)
- Crofting Community Right to Buy (Grant Towards Compensation Liability) (Scotland) Regulations 2004 (S.S.I. 2004/225)
- Crofting Community Right to Buy (Compensation) (Scotland) Order 2004 (S.S.I. 2004/226)
- Crofting Community Right to Buy (Ballot) (Scotland) Regulations 2004 (S.S.I. 2004/227)
- Community Right to Buy (Ballot) (Scotland) Regulations 2004 (S.S.I. 2004/228)
- Community Right to Buy (Compensation) (Scotland) Regulations 2004 (S.S.I. 2004/229)
- Community Right to Buy (Register of Community Interests in Land Charges) (Scotland) Regulations 2004 (S.S.I. 2004/230)
- Community Right to Buy (Specification of Plans) (Scotland) Regulations 2004 (S.S.I. 2004/231)
- Public Appointments and Public Bodies etc. (Scotland) Act 2003 (Commencement No. 3) Order 2004 (S.S.I. 2004/232)
- Community Right to Buy (Forms) (Scotland) Regulations 2004 (S.S.I. 2004/233)
- Farm Business Development (Scotland) Amendment Scheme 2004 (S.S.I. 2004/236)
- Food Protection (Emergency Prohibitions) (Amnesic Shellfish Poisoning) (West Coast) (No. 3) (Scotland) Order 2004 (S.S.I. 2004/237)
- St Mary's Music School (Aided Places) (Scotland) Amendment Regulations 2004 (S.S.I. 2004/238)
- Education (Assisted Places) (Scotland) Amendment Regulations 2004 (S.S.I. 2004/239)
- Criminal Justice (Scotland) Act 2003 (Commencement No. 4) Order 2004 (S.S.I. 2004/240)
- Kava-kava in Food (Scotland) Amendment Regulations 2004 (S.S.I. 2004/244)
- Horticultural Produce (Community Grading Rules) (Scotland) Revocation Regulations 2004 (S.S.I. 2004/245)
- Land Reform (Scotland) Act (Commencement No. 2) Order 2004 (S.S.I. 2004/247)
- Plant Health (Export Certification) (Scotland) Order 2004 (S.S.I. 2004/248)
- Plant Health Fees (Scotland) Amendment Regulations 2004 (S.S.I. 2004/249)
- Seed Potatoes (Fees) (Scotland) Regulations 2004 (S.S.I. 2004/250)
- Potatoes Originating in Poland (Notification) (Scotland) Order 2004 (S.S.I. 2004/255)
- Education (Student Loans) Amendment (Scotland) Regulations 2004 (S.S.I. 2004/256)
- Police (Scotland) Regulations 2004 (S.S.I. 2004/257)
- Environmental Assessment of Plans and Programmes (Scotland) Regulations 2004 (S.S.I. 2004/258)
- River Findhorn Salmon Fishery District (Baits and Lures) Regulations 2004 (S.S.I. 2004/259)
- Assynt - Coigach Area Protection Order 2004 (S.S.I. 2004/260)
- Shrimp Fishing Nets (Scotland) Order 2004 (S.S.I. 2004/261)
- Advice and Assistance (Scotland) Amendment (No. 2) Regulations 2004 (S.S.I. 2004/262)
- Criminal Legal Aid (Fixed Payments) (Scotland) Amendment (No. 3) Regulations 2004 (S.S.I. 2004/263)
- Criminal Legal Aid (Scotland) (Fees) Amendment Regulations 2004 (S.S.I. 2004/264)
- Agricultural Business Development Scheme (Scotland) Amendment Regulations 2004 (S.S.I. 2004/267)
- Regulation of Care (Social Service Workers) (Scotland) Order 2004 (S.S.I. 2004/268)
- Food Labelling Amendment (Scotland) Regulations 2004 (S.S.I. 2004/269)
- Individual Learning Account (Scotland) Amendment Regulations 2004 (S.S.I. 2004/270)
- National Health Service (Tribunal) (Scotland) Amendment (No. 2) Regulations 2004 (S.S.I. 2004/271)
- Common Agricultural Policy (Wine) (Scotland) Amendment Regulations 2004 (S.S.I. 2004/272)
- Education Maintenance Allowances (Scotland) Regulations 2004 (S.S.I. 2004/273)
- Glasgow Metropolitan College (Establishment) Order 2004 (S.S.I. 2004/274)
- Waste Management Licensing Amendment (Scotland) Regulations 2004 (S.S.I. 2004/275)
- Inshore Fishing (Prohibition of Fishing and Fishing Methods) (Scotland) Order 2004 (S.S.I. 2004/276)
- TSE (Scotland) Amendment Regulations 2004 (S.S.I. 2004/277)
- Common Agricultural Policy Non-IACS Support Schemes (Appeals) (Scotland) Regulations 2004 (S.S.I. 2004/278)
- Pig Carcase (Grading) Amendment (Scotland) Regulations 2004 (S.S.I. 2004/279)
- Beef Carcase (Classification) (Scotland) Regulations 2004 (S.S.I. 2004/280)
- Civil Legal Aid (Scotland) (Fees) Amendment Regulations 2004 (S.S.I. 2004/281)
- Criminal Legal Aid (Scotland) Amendment Regulations 2004 (S.S.I. 2004/282)
- Conservation of Seals (Scotland) Order 2004 (S.S.I. 2004/283)
- National Health Service (Borrowing and Loans from Endowments) (Scotland) (No. 2) Regulations 2004 (S.S.I. 2004/284)
- National Health Service (Transfer of Property between Health Boards) (Scotland) (No. 2) Regulations 2004 (S.S.I. 2004/285)
- Mental Health Tribunal for Scotland (Appointment of Legal Members) Regulations 2004 (S.S.I. 2004/286)
- Victim Statements (Prescribed Offences) (Scotland) Amendment (No. 2) Order 2004 (S.S.I. 2004/287)
- Homelessness etc. (Scotland) Act 2003 (Commencement No. 2) Order 2004 (S.S.I. 2004/288)
- Environmental Protection (Restriction on Use of Lead Shot) (Scotland) Regulations 2004 (S.S.I. 2004/289)
- Budget (Scotland) Act 2004 Amendment Order 2004 (S.S.I. 2004/290)
- Act of Sederunt (Rules of the Court of Session Amendment No. 4) (Personal Injuries Actions) 2004 (S.S.I. 2004/291)
- National Health Service (Vocational Training for General Dental Practice) (Scotland) Regulations 2004 (S.S.I. 2004/292)
- Regulation of Care (Scotland) Act 2001 (Transitional Provisions) Amendment Order 2004 (S.S.I. 2004/293)
- Community Right to Buy (Definition of Excluded Land) (Scotland) Order 2004 (S.S.I. 2004/296)
- Food Protection (Emergency Prohibitions) (Diarrhetic Shellfish Poisoning) (East Coast) (Scotland) Order 2004 (S.S.I. 2004/298)

== 301-400 ==
- Education Maintenance Allowances (Scotland) Amendment Regulations 2004 (S.S.I. 2004/301)
- European Communities (Lawyer's Practice) (Scotland) Amendment Regulations 2004 (S.S.I. 2004/302)
- Advice and Assistance (Scotland) Amendment (No. 2) Regulations 2004 Amendment Regulations 2004 (S.S.I. 2004/305)
- Advice and Assistance (Assistance by Way of Representation) (Scotland) Amendment Regulations 2004 (S.S.I. 2004/307)
- Advice and Assistance (Financial Limit) (Scotland) Amendment Regulations 2004 (S.S.I. 2004/308)
- Food Protection (Emergency Prohibitions) (Amnesic Shellfish Poisoning) (Orkney) (Scotland) Revocation Order 2004 (S.S.I. 2004/315)
- Criminal Legal Aid (Scotland) (Fees) Amendment (No. 2) Regulations 2004 (S.S.I. 2004/316)
- Oil and Fibre Plant Seed (Scotland) Regulations 2004 (S.S.I. 2004/317)
- Register of Sasines (Application Procedure) Rules 2004 (S.S.I. 2004/318)
- Food Protection (Emergency Prohibitions) (Amnesic Shellfish Poisoning) (West Coast) (No. 4) (Scotland) Order 2004 (S.S.I. 2004/319)
- Food Protection (Emergency Prohibitions) (Amnesic Shellfish Poisoning) (Orkney) (No. 2) (Scotland) Order 2004 (S.S.I. 2004/322)
- Food Protection (Emergency Prohibitions) (Amnesic Shellfish Poisoning) (West Coast) (No. 5) (Scotland) Order 2004 (S.S.I. 2004/323)
- Food Protection (Emergency Prohibitions) (Amnesic Shellfish Poisoning) (West Coast) (No. 6) (Scotland) Order 2004 (S.S.I. 2004/330)
- Act of Sederunt (Rules of the Court of Session Amendment No. 5) (Miscellaneous) 2004 (S.S.I. 2004/331)
- Town and Country Planning (Electronic Communications) (Scotland) Order 2004 (S.S.I. 2004/332)
- Act of Sederunt (Summary Applications, Statutory Applications and Appeals etc. Rules) Amendment (Protection of Children (Scotland) Act 2003) 2004 (S.S.I. 2004/334)
- National Health Service Reform (Scotland) Act 2004 (Commencement No. 1) Order 2004 (S.S.I. 2004/335)
- Food Protection (Emergency Prohibitions) (Amnesic Shellfish Poisoning) (Irish Sea) (Scotland) Order 2004 (S.S.I. 2004/340)
- Food Protection (Emergency Prohibitions) (Amnesic Shellfish Poisoning) (West Coast) (No. 7) (Scotland) Order 2004 (S.S.I. 2004/341)
- Food Protection (Emergency Prohibitions) (Amnesic Shellfish Poisoning) (West Coast) (No. 8) (Scotland) Order 2004 (S.S.I. 2004/344)
- Food Protection (Emergency Prohibitions) (Amnesic Shellfish Poisoning) (West Coast) (No. 4) (Scotland) Order 2004 Revocation Order 2004 (S.S.I. 2004/345)
- Act of Adjournal (Criminal Procedure Rules Amendment No. 3) (Extradition etc.) 2004 (S.S.I. 2004/346)
- Scottish Qualifications Authority Act 2002 (Commencement No. 2) Order 2004 (S.S.I. 2004/347)
- Housing (Scotland) Act 2001 (Payments out of Grants for Housing Support Services) Amendment (No. 2) Order 2004 (S.S.I. 2004/348)
- Food Protection (Emergency Prohibitions) (Diarrhetic Shellfish Poisoning) (East Coast) (Scotland) Revocation Order 2004 (S.S.I. 2004/349)
- Act of Sederunt (Ordinary Cause Rules) Amendment (Competition Appeal Tribunal) 2004 (S.S.I. 2004/350)
- Local Governance (Scotland) Act 2004 (Commencement No. 1 and Transitional Provisions) Order 2004 (S.S.I. 2004/351)
- Food Protection (Emergency Prohibitions) (Amnesic Shellfish Poisoning) (Orkney) (No. 3) (Scotland) Order 2004 (S.S.I. 2004/352)
- Sports Grounds and Sporting Events (Designation) (Scotland) Order 2004 (S.S.I. 2004/356)
- Environmental Protection (Restriction on Use of Lead Shot) (Scotland) (No. 2) Regulations 2004 (S.S.I. 2004/358)
- Food Protection (Emergency Prohibitions) (Amnesic Shellfish Poisoning) (West Coast) (No. 9) (Scotland) Order 2004 (S.S.I. 2004/359)
- International Criminal Court (Enforcement of Fines, Forfeiture and Reparation Orders) (Scotland) Regulations 2004 (S.S.I. 2004/360)
- National Health Service Reform (Scotland) Act 2004 (Commencement No. 2) Order 2004 (S.S.I. 2004/361)
- Mental Health (Care and Treatment) (Scotland) Act 2003 (Commencement No. 3) Order 2004 (S.S.I. 2004/367)
- Plant Protection Products (Scotland) Amendment Regulations 2004 (S.S.I. 2004/368)
- National Health Service (Charges to Overseas Visitors) (Scotland) Amendment Regulations 2004 (S.S.I. 2004/369)
- Sexual Offences Act 2003 (Prescribed Police Stations) (Scotland) Amendment Regulations 2004 (S.S.I. 2004/370)
- General Medical Services and Section 17C Agreements (Transitional and Other Ancillary Provisions) (Scotland) Amendment Order 2004 (S.S.I. 2004/372)
- Mental Health Tribunal for Scotland (Delegation of the President's Functions) Regulations 2004 (S.S.I. 2004/373)
- Mental Health Tribunal for Scotland (Appointment of Medical Members) Regulations 2004 (S.S.I. 2004/374)
- Mental Health Tribunal for Scotland (Appointment of General Members) Regulations 2004 (S.S.I. 2004/375)
- Freedom of Information (Fees for Disclosure under Section 13) (Scotland) Regulations 2004 (S.S.I. 2004/376)
- Regulation of Care (Scotland) Act 2001 (Commencement No. 5 and Transitional Provisions) Amendment Order 2004 (S.S.I. 2004/377)
- Food Protection (Emergency Prohibitions) (Diarrhetic Shellfish Poisoning) (East Coast) (No. 2) (Scotland) Order 2004 (S.S.I. 2004/378)
- Fishing Vessels (Satellite-tracking Devices) (Scotland) Scheme 2004 (S.S.I. 2004/379)
- Fodder Plant Seeds Amendment (Scotland) Regulations 2004 (S.S.I. 2004/380)
- Agricultural Subsidies (Appeals) (Scotland) Regulations 2004 (S.S.I. 2004/381)
- Law Reform (Miscellaneous Provisions) (Scotland) Act 1990 (Commencement No. 15) Order 2004 (S.S.I. 2004/382)
- Solicitors (Scotland) Act 1980 (Foreign Lawyers and Multi national Practices) Regulations 2004 (S.S.I. 2004/383)
- Agricultural Wages (Permits to Infirm and Incapacitated Persons) (Repeals) (Scotland) Regulations 2004 (S.S.I. 2004/384)
- Firemen's Pension Scheme Amendment (Scotland) Order 2004 (S.S.I. 2004/385)
- Community Health Partnerships (Scotland) Regulations 2004 (S.S.I. 2004/386)
- Mental Health (Advance Statements) (Prescribed Class of Persons) (Scotland) Regulations 2004 (S.S.I. 2004/387)
- Mental Health (Patient Representation) (Prescribed Persons) (Scotland) Regulations 2004 (S.S.I. 2004/388)
- National Assistance (Assessment of Resources) Amendment (No. 2) (Scotland) Regulations 2004 (S.S.I. 2004/389)
- Teachers (Medical Requirements for Admission to Training and Registration) (Scotland) Amendment Regulations 2004 (S.S.I. 2004/390)
- Sea Fishing (Enforcement of Community Satellite Monitoring Measures) (Scotland) Revocation Regulations 2004 (S.S.I. 2004/391)
- Sea Fishing (Enforcement of Community Satellite Monitoring Measures) (Scotland) Order 2004 (S.S.I. 2004/392)
- Fireworks (Scotland) Regulations 2004 (S.S.I. 2004/393)
- Food Safety (General Food Hygiene) Amendment (Scotland) Regulations 2004 (S.S.I. 2004/394)
- Food Safety (Act of Accession concerning the Czech Republic and other States) (Consequential Amendments) (Scotland) Regulations 2004 (S.S.I. 2004/395)
- Scottish Network 1 Tourist Board Scheme Order 2004 (S.S.I. 2004/396)
- Scottish Network 2 Tourist Board Scheme Order 2004 (S.S.I. 2004/397)
- Common Agricultural Policy Support Schemes (Modulation) (Scotland) Amendment Regulations 2004 (S.S.I. 2004/398)
- Pesticides (Maximum Residue Levels in Crops, Food and Feeding Stuffs) (Scotland) Amendment (No. 3) Regulations 2004 (S.S.I. 2004/399)
- Title Conditions (Scotland) Act 2003 (Conservation Bodies) Amendment Order 2004 (S.S.I. 2004/400)

== 401-500 ==
- Debt Arrangement and Attachment (Scotland) Act 2002 (Commencement) Order 2004 (S.S.I. 2004/401)
- Mental Health Tribunal for Scotland (Disciplinary Committee) Regulations 2004 (S.S.I. 2004/402)
- Building (Scotland) Act 2003 (Commencement No. 1, Transitional Provisions and Savings) Order 2004 (S.S.I. 2004/404)
- Criminal Procedure (Amendment) (Scotland) Act 2004 (Commencement, Transitional Provisions and Savings) Order 2004 (S.S.I. 2004/405)
- Building (Scotland) Regulations 2004 (S.S.I. 2004/406)
- Nature Conservation (Scotland) Act 2004 (Commencement) Order 2004 (S.S.I. 2004/407)
- Youth Justice and Criminal Evidence Act 1999 (Commencement No. 11) (Scotland) Order 2004 (S.S.I. 2004/408)
- Victim Notification (Prescribed Offences) (Scotland) Order 2004 (S.S.I. 2004/411)
- Food Protection (Emergency Prohibitions) (Amnesic Shellfish Poisoning) (West Coast) (No. 10) (Scotland) Order 2004 (S.S.I. 2004/412)
- Miscellaneous Food Additives Amendment (Scotland) Regulations 2004 (S.S.I. 2004/413)
- Feeding Stuffs (Sampling and Analysis) Amendment (Scotland) Regulations 2004 (S.S.I. 2004/414)
- Public Service Vehicles (Registration of Local Services) (Scotland) Amendment Regulations 2004 (S.S.I. 2004/415)
- Debt Arrangement and Attachment (Scotland) Act 2002 (Commencement No. 2 and Revocation) Order 2004 (S.S.I. 2004/416)
- Food Protection (Emergency Prohibitions) (Amnesic Shellfish Poisoning) (Orkney) (No. 4) (Scotland) Order 2004 (S.S.I. 2004/417)
- Food Protection (Emergency Prohibitions) (Amnesic Shellfish Poisoning) (West Coast) (No. 11) (Scotland) Order 2004 (S.S.I. 2004/418)
- Sale of Spray Paint (Display of Warning Statement) (Scotland) Regulations 2004 (S.S.I. 2004/419)
- The Antisocial Behaviour etc. (Scotland) Act 2004 (Commencement and Savings) Order 2004 (S.S.I. 2004/420)
- The Dunbar Harbour Revision (Transfer) Order 2004 (S.S.I. 2004/421)
- Controlled Waste (Fixed Penalty Notices) (Scotland) Order 2004 (S.S.I. 2004/426)
- Litter (Fixed Penalty Notices) (Scotland) Order 2004 (S.S.I. 2004/427)
- Building (Procedure) (Scotland) Regulations 2004 (S.S.I. 2004/428)
- Mental Health (Advance Statements) (Prescribed Class of Persons) (Scotland) (No. 2) Regulations 2004 (S.S.I. 2004/429)
- Mental Health (Patient Representation) (Prescribed Persons) (Scotland) (No. 2) Regulations 2004 (S.S.I. 2004/430)
- Genetically Modified Food (Scotland) Regulations 2004 (S.S.I. 2004/432)
- Genetically Modified Animal Feed (Scotland) Regulations 2004 (S.S.I. 2004/433)
- Act of Adjournal (Criminal Procedure Rules Amendment No. 4) (Criminal Procedure (Amendment) (Scotland) Act 2004) 2004 (S.S.I. 2004/434)
- Food Protection (Emergency Prohibitions) (Amnesic Shellfish Poisoning) (East Coast) (Scotland) Order 2004 (S.S.I. 2004/435)
- Food Protection (Emergency Prohibitions) (Diarrhetic Shellfish Poisoning) (East Coast) (No. 3) (Scotland) Order 2004 (S.S.I. 2004/436)
- International Criminal Court (Enforcement of Fines, Forfeiture and Reparation Orders) (Scotland) (Revocation) Regulations 2004 (S.S.I. 2004/437)
- Genetically Modified Organisms (Traceability and Labelling) (Scotland) Regulations 2004 (S.S.I. 2004/438)
- Genetically Modified Organisms (Deliberate Release) (Scotland) Amendment Regulations 2004 (S.S.I. 2004/439)
- Plant Health (Great Britain) Amendment (Scotland) Order 2004 (S.S.I. 2004/440)
- Food Protection (Emergency Prohibitions) (Amnesic Shellfish Poisoning) (Irish Sea) (Scotland) Revocation Order 2004 (S.S.I. 2004/446)
- Food Protection (Emergency Prohibitions) (Amnesic Shellfish Poisoning) (West Coast) (No. 12) (Scotland) Order 2004 (S.S.I. 2004/447)
- Debt Arrangement and Attachment (Scotland) Act 2002 (Transfer of Functions to the Accountant in Bankruptcy) Order 2004 (S.S.I. 2004/448)
- Scottish Water, Prevention of Water Pollution (Milngavie Waterworks) Byelaws Extension Order 2004 (S.S.I. 2004/449)
- Scottish Water, Prevention of Water Pollution (Loch Katrine, Loch Arklet, Glen Finglas) Byelaws Extension Order 2004 (S.S.I. 2004/450)
- Criminal Justice (Scotland) Act 2003 (Commencement No. 5) Order 2004 (S.S.I. 2004/451)
- Avian Influenza (Survey Powers) (Scotland) Regulations 2004 (S.S.I. 2004/453)
- Act of Sederunt (Summary Applications, Statutory Applications and Appeals etc. Rules) Amendment (Antisocial Behaviour etc. (Scotland) Act 2004) 2004 (S.S.I. 2004/455)
- Housing Grants (Assessment of Contributions) (Scotland) Amendment Regulations 2004 (S.S.I. 2004/456)
- Feeding Stuffs (Scotland) Amendment (No. 2) Regulations 2004 (S.S.I. 2004/458)
- Food Protection (Emergency Prohibitions) (Diarrhetic Shellfish Poisoning) (East Coast) (No. 2) (Scotland) Revocation Order 2004 (S.S.I. 2004/463)
- Scottish Network 1 Tourist Board Scheme Amendment Order 2004 (S.S.I. 2004/464)
- Scottish Network 2 Tourist Board Scheme Amendment Order 2004 (S.S.I. 2004/465)
- Freedom of Information (Fees for Required Disclosure) (Scotland) Regulations 2004 (S.S.I. 2004/467)
- Debt Arrangement Scheme (Scotland) Regulations 2004 (S.S.I. 2004/468)
- Education (Graduate Endowment, Student Fees and Support) Switzerland (Scotland) Amendment Regulations 2004 (S.S.I. 2004/469)
- Debt Arrangement Scheme (Scotland) Amendment Regulations 2004 (S.S.I. 2004/470)
- Marketing of Fruit Plant Material Amendment (Scotland) Regulations 2004 (S.S.I. 2004/471)
- Food Labelling Amendment (No. 2) (Scotland) Regulations 2004 (S.S.I. 2004/472)
- Ethical Standards in Public Life etc. (Scotland) Act 2000 (Modification of National Parks (Scotland) Act 2000) Order 2004 (S.S.I. 2004/473)
- Nature Conservation (Designation of Relevant Regulatory Authorities) (Scotland) Order 2004 (S.S.I. 2004/474)
- Conservation (Natural Habitats, &c.) Amendment (Scotland) Regulations 2004 (S.S.I. 2004/475)
- Land Registration (Scotland) Amendment Rules 2004 (S.S.I. 2004/476)
- Title Conditions (Scotland) Act 2003 (Rural Housing Bodies) Order 2004 (S.S.I. 2004/477)
- Abolition of Feudal Tenure etc. (Scotland) Act 2000 (Prescribed Periods) Order 2004 (S.S.I. 2004/478)
- Lands Tribunal for Scotland (Title Conditions Certificates) (Fees) Rules 2004 (S.S.I. 2004/479)
- Lands Tribunal for Scotland Amendment (Fees) Rules 2004 (S.S.I. 2004/480)
- Act of Adjournal (Criminal Procedure Rules Amendment No. 5) (Miscellaneous) 2004 (S.S.I. 2004/481)
- Public Finance and Accountability (Scotland) Act 2000 (Economy, efficiency and effectiveness examinations) (Specified bodies etc.) Order 2004 (S.S.I. 2004/482)
- Food Protection (Emergency Prohibitions) (Amnesic Shellfish Poisoning) (West Coast) (No. 13) (Scotland) Order 2004 (S.S.I. 2004/484)
- Mallaig Harbour Revision Order 2004 (S.S.I. 2004/485)
- Police Pensions Amendment (Scotland) Regulations 2004 (S.S.I. 2004/486)
- Tenements (Scotland) Act 2004 (Commencement No. 1) Order 2004 (S.S.I. 2004/487)
- Plant Health (Phytophthora ramorum) (Scotland) Order 2004 (S.S.I. 2004/488)
- Homeless Persons (Unsuitable Accommodation) (Scotland) Order 2004 (S.S.I. 2004/489)
- Tenements (Scotland) Act 2004 (Notice of Potential Liability for Costs) Amendment Order 2004 (S.S.I. 2004/490)
- Civil Legal Aid (Scotland) Amendment (No. 2) Regulations 2004 (S.S.I. 2004/491)
- Advice and Assistance (Scotland) Amendment (No. 3) Regulations 2004 (S.S.I. 2004/492)
- Legal Aid (Scotland) Act 1986 Amendment Regulations 2004 (S.S.I. 2004/493)
- Asylum and Immigration (Treatment of Claimants, etc.) Act 2004 (Commencement) (Scotland) Order 2004 (S.S.I. 2004/494)
- Nature Conservation (Scotland) Act 2004 (Commencement No. 2) Order 2004 (S.S.I. 2004/495)
- Agricultural Holdings (Fees) (Scotland) Order 2004 (S.S.I. 2004/496)
- Agricultural Holdings (Forms) (Scotland) Regulations 2004 (S.S.I. 2004/497)
- Sea Fish (Marketing Standards) (Scotland) Regulations 2004 (S.S.I. 2004/498)
- Maximum Number of Judges (Scotland) Order 2004 (S.S.I. 2004/499)
- Food Protection (Emergency Prohibitions) (Amnesic Shellfish Poisoning) (East Coast) (No. 2) (Scotland) Order 2004 (S.S.I. 2004/500)

== 501-565 ==
- Food Protection (Emergency Prohibitions) (Amnesic Shellfish Poisoning) (East Coast) (Scotland) Revocation Order 2004 (S.S.I. 2004/501)
- Food Protection (Emergency Prohibitions) (Diarrhetic Shellfish Poisoning) (East Coast) (No. 3) (Scotland) Revocation Order 2004 (S.S.I. 2004/502)
- Act of Sederunt (Debt Arrangement and Attachment (Scotland) Act 2002) Amendment (The Debt Arrangement Scheme (Scotland) Regulations 2004) 2004 (S.S.I. 2004/505)
- Building Standards Advisory Committee (Scotland) Regulations 2004 (S.S.I. 2004/506)
- Fees in the Registers of Scotland Amendment Order 2004 (S.S.I. 2004/507)
- Building (Fees) (Scotland) Regulations 2004 (S.S.I. 2004/508)
- Food Protection (Emergency Prohibitions) (Amnesic Shellfish Poisoning) (East Coast) (No. 2) (Scotland) Revocation Order 2004 (S.S.I. 2004/510)
- Agricultural Holdings (Scotland) Act 2003 (Commencement No. 4) Order 2004 (S.S.I. 2004/511)
- Control of Volatile Organic Compounds (Petrol Vapour Recovery) (Scotland) Regulations 2004 (S.S.I. 2004/512)
- Act of Sederunt (Fees of Sheriff Officers) 2004 (S.S.I. 2004/513)
- Act of Sederunt (Rules of the Court of Session Amendment No. 6) (Miscellaneous) 2004 (S.S.I. 2004/514)
- Act of Sederunt (Fees of Messengers-at-Arms) 2004 (S.S.I. 2004/515)
- Water Environment (Register of Protected Areas) (Scotland) Regulations 2004 (S.S.I. 2004/516)
- Common Agricultural Policy Schemes (Cross-Compliance) (Scotland) Regulations 2004 (S.S.I. 2004/518)
- Road User Charging (Exemption from Charges) (Scotland) Regulations 2004 (S.S.I. 2004/519)
- Environmental Information (Scotland) Regulations 2004 (S.S.I. 2004/520)
- Race Relations Act 1976 (Statutory Duties) (Scotland) Amendment Order 2004 (S.S.I. 2004/521)
- Protection of Children (Scotland) Act 2003 (Commencement No. 1) Order 2004 (S.S.I. 2004/522)
- Protection of Children (Scotland) Act 2003 Determination Regulations 2004 (S.S.I. 2004/523)
- Plastic Materials and Articles in Contact with Food Amendment (Scotland) Regulations 2004 (S.S.I. 2004/524)
- Contaminants in Food (Scotland) Regulations 2004 (S.S.I. 2004/525)
- Police Act 1997 (Criminal Records) (Protection of Children) (Scotland) Regulations 2004 (S.S.I. 2004/526)
- Fire Services (Appointments and Promotion) (Scotland) Regulations 2004 (S.S.I. 2004/527)
- Standards in Scotland's Schools etc. Act 2000 (Commencement No. 7) Order 2004 (S.S.I. 2004/528)
- Mental Health (Care and Treatment) (Scotland) Act 2003 Modification Order 2004 (S.S.I. 2004/533)
- Act of Sederunt (Sheriff Court Bankruptcy Rules) 1996 Amendment 2004 (S.S.I. 2004/534)
- Abolition of Feudal Tenure etc. (Scotland) Act 2000 (Consequential Provisions) Order 2004 (S.S.I. 2004/535)
- Salmonella in Laying Flocks (Sampling Powers) (Scotland) Regulations 2004 (S.S.I. 2004/536)
- Diseases of Animals (Approved Disinfectants) Amendment (Scotland) Order 2004 (S.S.I. 2004/537)
- Church of Scotland (Property and Endowments) (Amendment) Act 1933 Order 2004 (S.S.I. 2004/538)
- Education (Listed Bodies) (Scotland) Order 2004 (S.S.I. 2004/539)
- Environment Act 1995 (Commencement No. 22) (Scotland) Order 2004 (S.S.I. 2004/541)
- General Teaching Council for Scotland Election Scheme 2004 Approval Order 2004 (S.S.I. 2004/542)
- Ethical Standards in Public Life etc. (Scotland) Act 2000 (Devolved Public Bodies) Order 2004 (S.S.I. 2004/543)
- Tobacco Advertising and Promotion Act 2002 (Commencement No. 8) (Scotland) Order 2004 (S.S.I. 2004/546)
- Food Protection (Emergency Prohibitions) (Amnesic Shellfish Poisoning) (Orkney) (No. 4) (Scotland) Revocation Order 2004 (S.S.I. 2004/547)
- Sweeteners in Food Amendment (Scotland) Regulations 2004 (S.S.I. 2004/548)
- Food Protection (Emergency Prohibitions) (Amnesic Shellfish Poisoning) (West Coast) (No. 10) (Scotland) Partial Revocation Order 2004 (S.S.I. 2004/549)
- Solicitors (Scotland) Act 1980 (Compensation for Inadequate Professional Services) Order 2004 (S.S.I. 2004/550)
- Tenements (Scotland) Act 2004 (Consequential Provisions) Order 2004 (S.S.I. 2004/551)
- Title Conditions (Scotland) Act 2003 (Notice of Potential Liability for Costs) Amendment Order 2004 (S.S.I. 2004/552)
- Food Protection (Emergency Prohibitions) (Amnesic Shellfish Poisoning) (West Coast) (No. 7) (Scotland) Partial Revocation Order 2004 (S.S.I. 2004/553)
- Protection of Children (Scotland) Act 2003 (Commencement No. 1) Amendment Order 2004 (S.S.I. 2004/556)
- Agricultural Holdings (Right to Buy Modifications) (Scotland) Regulations 2004 (S.S.I. 2004/557)
- Local Governance (Scotland) Act 2004 (Commencement No. 2) Order 2004 (S.S.I. 2004/558)
- Budget (Scotland) Act 2004 Amendment (No. 2) Order 2004 (S.S.I. 2004/565)
