= Sam Aaronovitch =

English economist (1919–1998)

- Born: Samuel Aaronovitch; 26 December 1919; London, England
- Died: 30 May 1998 (aged 78); London, England
- Education: Balliol College, Oxford
- Occupations: Activist and author
- Children: 5; including David, Owen and Ben Aaronovitch
- Writing career
- Genre: Economics

Sam Aaronovitch (26 December 1919 – 30 May 1998) was a British economist, academic, working class intellectual and senior member of the Communist Party of Great Britain.

== Biography ==
Aaronovitch was born in the East End of London to Jewish immigrants and his early years were devoted to activity as a Communist Party militant and then a party full timer. In 1945 he was the election agent for one of only two Communist candidates ever elected to the London County Council.

Near the age of 50, he entered academia as an economist after studying at Balliol College, Oxford for a D.Phil. (without any previous academic qualifications) from 1967 to 1971. He once explained his difficulties in filling in applications for university posts: "Education: St George's-in-the-East Secondary, Stepney 1930–34; Balliol College, Oxford 1967–71."

He became head of the economics department at South Bank Polytechnic and published a stream of books and articles on topics such as industrial pricing, insurance, monopoly, the impact of the City on the London economy, and macroeconomic policy. Although he remained a Communist Party member and a firm Marxist, he was a critic of party orthodoxy.

Working with a team of militant trade union officials and young intellectuals, Aaronovitch helped develop the Alternative Economic Strategy for the Labour movement only to see it derailed by the 1979 election victory of Margaret Thatcher.

He published a series of books on British political economy helping popularize the subject and as a speaker was able to combine and integrate industrial and academic viewpoints.

Aaronovitch aligned himself with the modernizing Eurocommunist movement in the 1980s and was a frequent contributor to Marxism Today. In 1981, he published The Road from Thatcherism in an attempt to articulate the need for a broad alliance against Thatcherism.

In 1982, he established and ran the Local Economic Policy Unit and published the journal Local Economy. The Sam Aaronovitch Memorial Prize is awarded each year.

Falling ill, he retired from South Bank University in 1997.

He was married three times, to Bertha, Kirstine, and Lavender. He was survived by five children, among them the science fiction scriptwriter and fantasy novelist Ben Aaronovitch, journalist David Aaronovitch and actor Owen Aaronovitch. A family memoir by David Aaronovitch, Party Animals: My Family and Other Communists, was published in January 2016.
