= Mountaineering Scotland =

Representative body

- Predecessor: Mountaineering Council of Scotland (MCofS); Association of Scottish Climbing Clubs.
- Formation: 1970; 56 years ago
- Headquarters: Perth, Scotland
- CEO: Stuart Younie
- President: Anne Butler
- Website: www.mountaineering.scot

Mountaineering Scotland is the national representative body and membership organisation for mountaineers, hillwalkers, climbers and ski tourers who live in Scotland or enjoy Scotland's mountains. With nearly 16,000 members as of 2022, it encourages participation and progression in these activities, promotes safety and skills, campaigns to safeguard access rights and responsibilities, and seeks to protect Scotland's cherished mountain landscapes from insensitive development. The organisation is based in Perth and was formerly known as the Mountaineering Council of Scotland (MCofS).

As a not-for-profit organisation, it relies on funding from a combination of membership subscriptions, non-governmental grants and investment from SportScotland.

== Aims ==
- To act as the representative body for hill walkers, climbers (indoors and outdoors), mountaineers and snowsport tourers in Scotland
- To cultivate a flourishing, diverse and sustainable mountaineering community in Scotland
- To promote enjoyment, safety and risk awareness, leading to self-reliance in mountaineering related activities
- To safeguard and secure responsible access to hill and crag
- To protect the mountain environment from insensitive development
- To co-operate with other organisations with common interests
- To provide an excellent value benefits package to members, enabling them to get the most out of their mountaineering activities

== Activities ==
Mountaineering Scotland has an authoritative website which provides wide-ranging advice on getting started and developing skills for the hills. It produces the only magazine dedicated to Scotland's hill walking, climbing and mountaineering community, "The Scottish Mountaineer", a quarterly publication received by members. It also has a presence on following on Facebook and Twitter

As well as their magazine subscription, members receive a wide range of benefits, including a membership card giving discounts at outdoor shops, places to stay and other useful services; access to subsidised mountain skills courses, a network of mountaineering huts, eligibility to take part in climbing competitions and coaching, and liability insurance for mountaineering activities.

Key areas of activity include encouraging safe practice on hill and crag; safeguarding access to upland areas following the introduction of the Land Reform (Scotland) Act 2003 and Scottish Outdoor Access Code, and campaigning on conservation of the mountain environment.

== History ==
The MCofS was formed in 1970 by the Association of Scottish Climbing Clubs to represent the views of mountaineers in Scotland. In September 2015 it introduced the ClimbScotland brand to encourage and support young people in Scotland to get climbing. In July 2016, the organisation announced a rebranding as "Mountaineering Scotland".

As of 2022 it represents a total of 15,630 members.

== See also ==
- British Mountaineering Council (BMC), the national representative body for England and Wales.
- Mountaineering Ireland
