= List of acts of the Scottish Parliament from 2004 =

This is a list of acts of the Scottish Parliament passed in 2004. Acts of the Scottish Parliament are enacted by the Scottish Parliament, which has legislative authority over devolved matters in relation to Scotland under the authority of the Scotland Act 1998. Acts are cited by calendar year, in the same fashion as acts of Parliament of the United Kingdom. Each act passed in a respective year is numbered consecutively with Arabic numerals, following the prefix "asp".

12 acts of the Scottish Parliament were passed in 2004.

indicates that an act has been transcribed on Wikisource, indicates that an act is available to view at legislation.gov.uk, and indicates the location of the original act in the Parliamentary Archives.

== Acts of the Scottish Parliament ==
Short title	Citation	Royal assent
Long title
Primary Medical Services (Scotland) Act 2004	2004 asp 1	27 January 2004
An Act of the Scottish Parliament to make provision in relation to the provision of primary medical services; and for connected purposes.
Budget (Scotland) Act 2004	2004 asp 2	23 March 2004
An Act of the Scottish Parliament to make provision, for financial year 2004/05, for the use of resources by the Scottish Administration and certain bodies whose expenditure is payable out of the Scottish Consolidated Fund, for authorising the payment of sums out of the Fund and for the maximum amounts of borrowing by certain statutory bodies; to make provision, for financial year 2005/06, for authorising the payment of sums out of the Fund on a temporary basis; and for connected purposes.
Vulnerable Witnesses (Scotland) Act 2004	2004 asp 3	14 April 2004
An Act of the Scottish Parliament to make provision for the use of special measures for the purpose of taking the evidence of children and other vulnerable witnesses in criminal or civil proceedings; to provide for evidential presumptions in criminal proceedings where certain reports of identification procedures are lodged as productions; to make provision about the admissibility of expert psychological or psychiatric evidence as to subsequent behaviour of the complainer in criminal proceedings in respect of certain offences; to prohibit persons charged with certain offences from conducting their own defence at the trial and any victim statement proof where a child witness under the age of 12 is to give evidence at the trial; to enable the court to prohibit persons from conducting their own defence at the trial and any victim statement proof in other criminal proceedings in which a vulnerable witness is to give evidence; to prohibit persons charged with certain offences from seeking to precognosce personally a child under the age of 12; to make provision about the admissibility of certain evidence bearing on the character, conduct or condition of witnesses in proceedings before a sheriff relating to the establishment of grounds of referral to children's hearings; to abolish the competence test for witnesses in criminal and civil proceedings; and for connected purposes.
Education (Additional Support for Learning) (Scotland) Act 2004	2004 asp 4	7 May 2004
An Act of the Scottish Parliament to make provision for additional support in connection with the school education of children and young persons having additional support needs; and for connected purposes.
Criminal Procedure (Amendment) (Scotland) Act 2004	2004 asp 5	4 June 2004
An Act of the Scottish Parliament to make provision, in connection with proceedings in the High Court of Justiciary, for the holding of preliminary hearings prior to the trial diet; to make new provision as to the continuation of the trial diet in proceedings in the High Court; to amend the time limit for commencement of the trial in proceedings in the High Court; in connection with solemn criminal proceedings generally, to amend the consequences of failure to comply with time limits, to make further provision as to citation of the accused, witnesses and jurors, to require any solicitor engaged by the accused to notify the court and the prosecutor of his engagement, withdrawal and dismissal, to make new provision as to the procedure where the trial diet does not proceed, to enable the trial to be conducted in the absence of the accused in certain circumstances, to provide for the apprehension, detention and release on bail of obstructive witnesses, to enable notices and other documents to be served on the accused through his solicitor, to restate with modifications certain provisions in relation to the raising of preliminary pleas and issues and to make new provision as to the adjournment and alteration of diets; to enable persons to be released on bail subject to a requirement that their compliance with conditions of bail restricting their movements be remotely monitored; to make provision entitling the prosecutor to be heard on certain applications relating to bail; to make further provision as to the matters to be dealt with by the sheriff court at a first diet in solemn proceedings; to make new provision as to the procedure to be followed by the court in sentencing offenders who have pled guilty; to increase from three to five years the maximum extended sentence that may be imposed by a sheriff on persons convicted on indictment of certain violent and sexual offences; to make new provision as to the citation of witnesses for precognition by the prosecutor; to clarify when criminal proceedings are finally determined for the purposes of section 10 of the Protection of Children (Scotland) Act 2003 (Note: Protection of Children (Scotland) Act 2003 (asp 5)) (asp 5); and for connected purposes.
Nature Conservation (Scotland) Act 2004	2004 asp 6	11 June 2004
An Act of the Scottish Parliament to make provision in relation to the conservation of biodiversity; to make further provision in relation to the conservation and enhancement of Scotland's natural features; to amend the law relating to the protection of certain birds, animals and plants; and for connected purposes.
National Health Service Reform (Scotland) Act 2004	2004 asp 7	11 June 2004
An Act of the Scottish Parliament to make provision in relation to the organisation and operation of the National Health Service and the promotion of health improvement; and for connected purposes.
Antisocial Behaviour etc. (Scotland) Act 2004	2004 asp 8	26 July 2004
An Act of the Scottish Parliament to make provision in connection with antisocial behaviour; to make provision about criminal justice; to make provision in relation to child welfare; and for connected purposes.
Local Governance (Scotland) Act 2004	2004 asp 9	29 July 2004
An Act of the Scottish Parliament to make provision for the election of councillors by single transferable vote and in relation to candidates to be councillor; to make provision in relation to certain restrictions upon being a councillor and upon former councillors; to make new provision about remuneration for and other payments to councillors; and for connected purposes.
Stirling-Alloa-Kincardine Railway and Linked Improvements Act 2004	2004 asp 10	10 August 2004
An Act of the Scottish Parliament to authorise the reconstruction of a railway from Stirling to Kincardine; to authorise the construction of the Alloa Eastern Link Road, necessitated by the railway; and for connected purposes.
Tenements (Scotland) Act 2004	2004 asp 11	22 October 2004
An Act of the Scottish Parliament to make provision about the boundaries and pertinents of properties comprised in tenements and for the regulation of the rights and duties of the owners of properties comprised in tenements; to make minor amendments of the Title Conditions (Scotland) Act 2003 (Note: Title Conditions (Scotland) Act 2003 (asp 9)) (asp 9); and for connected purposes.
School Education (Ministerial Powers and Independent Schools) (Scotland) Act 2004	2004 asp 12	12 November 2004
An Act of the Scottish Parliament to confer power on the Scottish Ministers, following inspection of a public or grant-aided school or of an education authority, to direct the school managers or the authority to take specified action; to provide that all non-public schools which provide full-time education for pupils of school age are independent schools; to abolish provisional registration of independent schools; to make amended provision for the registration and regulation of independent schools; to provide for appeals to the sheriff principal against certain decisions by the Scottish Ministers in relation to such schools; and for connected purposes.

== See also ==
- List of acts of the Scottish Parliament
