= Community Empowerment (Scotland) Act 2015 =

Act of the Scottish Parliament

Community Empowerment (Scotland) Act 2015 (Note: Section 146.)
- Act of the Scottish Parliament
- Scottish Parliament
- Long title: An Act of the Scottish Parliament to make provision about national outcomes; to confer functions on certain persons in relation to services provided by, and assets of, certain public bodies; to amend Parts 2 and 3 of the Land Reform (Scotland) Act 2003; to enable certain bodies to buy abandoned, neglected or detrimental land; to amend section 7C of the Forestry Act 1967; to enable the Scottish Ministers to make provision about supporters’ involvement in and ownership of football clubs; to make provision for registers of common good property and about disposal and use of such property; to restate and amend the law on allotments; to enable participation in decision-making by specified persons having public functions; to enable local authorities to reduce or remit non-domestic rates; and for connected purposes.
- Citation: 2015 asp 6
- Introduced by: John Swinney, Cabinet Secretary for Finance, Constitution and Economy
- Territorial extent: Scotland

Dates
- Royal assent: 24 July 2015
- Commencement: 25 July 2015 (sections 141–143, 145 and 146); various (in part); 15 April 2016 (rest of act); (Note: Section 145.)

Other legislation
- Amends: Forestry Act 1967; Local Government (Scotland) Act 1973
- Relates to: Land Reform (Scotland) Act 2003

Status: Current legislation

History of passage through the Parliament

Text of statute as originally enacted

Text of the Community Empowerment (Scotland) Act 2015 as in force today (including any amendments) within the United Kingdom, from legislation.gov.uk.

The Community Empowerment (Scotland) Act 2015 (asp 6) is an act of the Scottish Parliament. The act is notable for expanding the Community Right to Buy established by the Land Reform (Scotland) Act 2003 to include urban communities and for introducing new powers for Scottish Ministers to compel owners of abandoned or neglected to land to interested community bodies.

== Provisions ==
Provisions of the act are spread over eleven parts, covering different areas relating to community empowerment and public participation in policy and planning.

Part 1, National Outcomes, requires Scottish Ministers to continue the existing practice of setting national outcomes for Scotland, to which public authorities, people and organisations are to have regard when carrying out public functions. Ministers must regularly report progress toward them and to review them at least every five years.

Part 2, Community Planning, creates a statutory basis for Community Planning Partnerships, imposing duties on them to involve community bodies in the delivery of local outcomes and to produce “locality plans” for particularly disadvantaged areas.

Part 3, Participation Requests, provides a mechanism for community bodies to request participation in services to improve local outcomes, which can include community bodies taking responsibility for the delivery of services.

Part 4, Community Rights to Buy Land, amends the Land Reform (Scotland) Act 2003 to extend the community right to by to communities of any size, allowing urban communities to register an interest in land granting them first right of refusal should the land come up for sale. The act also introduces a new community right to buy land which is abandoned, neglected or causing harm to the environmental wellbeing of the community. This allows Scottish ministers to compel private owners of land to community bodies if they deem the sale likely to contribute to sustainable local development.

Part 5, Asset Transfer Requests, provides community bodies with the right to request to purchase, lease, manage or use land and buildings held by local authorities, Scottish ministers and other Scottish public bodies, of which relevant authorities will be required to create and maintain a publicly available register. In deciding whether to agree to asset transfers, public bodies are to consider the reduction of inequalities though there is a presumption of agreement unless there are reasonable grounds for refusal.

Part 6, Delegation of Forestry Commissioners’ Functions, allows for different types of community body to be involved in forestry leasing and to request asset transfers from Scotland’s National Forest Estate.

Part 7, Football Clubs, provides powers for Ministers to make regulations to facilitate supporters’ involvement in the decision making, and potentially ownership, of football clubs and give fans rights in these areas.

Part 8, Common Good Property, requires local authorities to establish and maintain a register of all common good property which they hold. It also requires local authorities to inform and consult community bodies before disposing of or changing the use of common good assets.

Part 9, Allotments, updates and simplifies legislation on allotments. It requires local authorities to take reasonable steps to provide allotments if waiting lists exceed certain trigger points and strengthens the protection for allotments. Provisions allow allotments to be 250 square metres in size or a different size that is to be agreed between the person requesting an allotment and the local authority. The Act also requires fair rents to be set and allows tenants to sell surplus produce grown on an allotment, provided this is not intended to produce a profit. There is a requirement for local authorities to develop a food growing strategy for their area, including identifying land that may be used as allotment sites and identifying other areas of land that could be used by a community for the cultivation of vegetables, fruit, herbs or flowers.

Part 10, Participation in Public Decision-Making, creates new regulation-making powers enabling Ministers to require Scottish public authorities to promote and facilitate public participation in the decisions and activities of the authority, including in the allocation of its resources.

Part 11, Non-domestic rates, allows councils to create and fund their own localised business rates relief schemes, in addition to existing national rates relief.

== Application ==
The act allowed Highland Council to sell a park in Torridon worth £20,000 to the Torridon District Community Association, a community group, for £1.

== Useful sources ==
Elliott, I.C., Fejszes, V. and Tàrrega, M. (2018), "The Community Empowerment Act and localism under devolution in Scotland: The perspective of multiple stakeholders in a council ward", International Journal of Public Sector Management. https://doi.org/10.1108/IJPSM-03-2018-0080

Lawson, L. and Kearns, A. (2010), “‘Community empowerment’ in the context of the Glasgow housing stock transfer”, Urban Studies, Vol. 47 No. 7, pp. 1459–1478. https://doi.org/10.1177/0042098009353619

Lawson, L. and Kearns, A. (2014), “Rethinking the purpose of community empowerment in neighbourhood regeneration”, Local Economy, Vol. 29 Nos 1-2, pp. 65–81. https://doi.org/10.1177/0269094213519307

Rolfe, S. (2016), “Divergence in community participation policy: analysing localism and community empowerment using a theory of change approach”, Local Government Studies, Vol. 42 No. 1, pp. 97–118. https://doi.org/10.1080/03003930.2015.1081848

== See also ==
- Land Reform in Scotland
- Community ownership
- Land Reform (Scotland) Act 2003
- Land Reform (Scotland) Act 2016
