= Education (Additional Support for Learning) (Scotland) Act 2004 =

Act of the Scottish Parliament

Education (Additional Support for Learning) (Scotland) Act 2004 (Note: Section 35(2).)
- Act of the Scottish Parliament
- Scottish Parliament
- Long title: An Act of the Scottish Parliament to make provision for additional support in connection with the school education of children and young persons having additional support needs; and for connected purposes.
- Citation: 2004 asp 4
- Introduced by: Peter Peacock Scottish Executive, 28 October 2003
- Territorial extent: Scotland

Dates
- Royal assent: 7 May 2004
- Commencement: Various dates from 7 May 2004
Other legislation
Amends	Education (Scotland) Act 1980

Status: Amended

History of passage through the Parliament

Text of statute as originally enacted

Text of the Education (Additional Support for Learning) (Scotland) Act 2004 as in force today (including any amendments) within the United Kingdom, from legislation.gov.uk.

The Education (Additional Support for Learning) (Scotland) Act 2004 (asp 4) is an act of the Scottish Parliament that received royal assent in 2004. It seeks to redefine the law relating to the provision of special education to children with additional needs by establishing a framework for the policies of inclusion and generally practising the "presumption of mainstreaming" in Scottish education. The act is an attempt to broaden the narrow definition of special educational needs (SEN) which has typically been used to define children with special needs.

== Special educational needs ==
Under the SEN model, certain children were classified as having special needs, and a formal "record of needs" (RoN) was opened and maintained. The opening of an RoN placed a legal obligation on the local authority to meet the needs of the child or young person as defined in the record. Additional support, staffing, resources and places at special schools were largely dependent on the needs and targets set out in the student's RoN.

== Principles ==
The new act defines a system of additional support needs (ASN) which replaces special educational needs. The act states that, at some point in their education, all children may require some form of additional support. The act says: "A child may require additional support for a variety of reasons. These may include those who are being bullied, are particularly gifted, have experienced a bereavement, or are not attending school regularly, as well as those who have behavioural or learning difficulties, mental health problems, or specific disabilities such as deafness or blindness."

== Implementation ==
The act places a duty on education authorities to establish procedures for identifying and meeting the additional support needs of children and young people. The identified needs must be kept under review and it will be the responsibility of all agencies to help education authorities meet their duties. The act defines such agencies as "including the local authority’s social work services, any health board, any other local authority or other agency specified by Scottish Ministers, such as Careers Scotland or further education colleges."

The new structure is intended to make accessing support easier for parents and carers. Where parents believe that their child has additional support needs they are able to request assessments which they believe are necessary; education authorities also have this ability. In situations where there is disagreement, education authorities will be under a duty to provide mediation services and they will be required to have arrangements in place for resolving disputes.

The act is intended to provide support for children with long or short term barriers to learning, including children with severe and complex needs. Where more than one support service is involved in the provision of support for a child, a co-ordinated support plan (CSP) will be drawn up by the relevant agencies, (e.g., school and grief counsellor).
