= Owen Aaronovitch =

British actor

- Born: 1956 (age 69–70); London, England
- Occupation: Actor
- Years active: 1991–present
- Spouse: Fiona Bruce

Owen Aaronovitch (born 29 November 1956) is an English actor, known for portraying Jon Lindsay in Coronation Street.

== Background ==
Aaronovitch was born in Parliament Hill, London. He is the son of the late economist and communist Sam Aaronovitch, and brother of the journalist David Aaronovitch and writer Ben Aaronovitch. Aaronovitch attended Dame Alice Owen's School in Islington, and at the age of eighteen moved to Newcastle to study creative arts.

Aaronovitch is married to actress Fiona Bruce, with whom he has two children, Frankie and Ruben. It is often falsely reported on fan websites that Aaronovitch's wife is the newsreader and Antiques Roadshow presenter Fiona Bruce. This is false. His wife, of the same name, is an actress and teaches drama along with her husband.

== Acting career ==
Aaronovitch made his professional debut at the Belgrade Theatre in Coventry. His theatre work includes The Great Gatsby, The Hunchback of Notre-Dame, Pinocchio, The Waltz and Red Dust Blue Dreams.

Aaronovitch played the role of fake airline pilot Jon Lindsay, the con man responsible for Deirdre Rachid's imprisonment, in Coronation Street from 1997 to 1998. He also did a parody of this role, as a drag character called Jean Lindsay on Harry Hill.

His other television credits include Prime Suspect, A Touch of Frost, Reckless, The Bill and Doctors.

Aaronovitch also portrayed Olag Gan in the 2006 audio revival of Blake's 7.

== Filmography ==
Year	Title	Role	Notes
1991	Prime Suspect	Tony: Prime Suspect (1991)	Crime drama
1994	A Touch of Frost	Man with Dog: Stranger in the House	Police procedural
1995	Cracker	Charnock: Brotherly Love (1995)	Crime drama
1996	A Touch of Frost	Fire Officer: Paying the Price (1996)	Police procedural
1996	Heartbeat	Clive Kenway: Obsessions (1996)	Period crime drama
1996	Hillsborough		Television film
1997	Coronation Street	Jon Lindsay (1997–1998)	Soap opera
1997	Reckless	Cab Driver	Television serial
2003	Holby City	Jonathan Collinson: Private Lives (2003)	Medical drama
2004	The Courtroom	Gary Cullen: Like a Robot (2004)	Legal drama
2008	Doctors	Marvin Elliot: Stand Up and Be Counted (2008)	Soap opera
