= Land Reform (Scotland) Act 2016 =

Act of the Scottish Parliament

Land Reform (Scotland) Act 2016 (Note: Section 131.)
- Act of the Scottish Parliament
- Scottish Parliament
- Long title: An Act of the Scottish Parliament to make provision for a land rights and responsibilities statement; to establish the Scottish Land Commission, provide for its functions and the functions of the Land Commissioners and the Tenant Farming Commissioner; to make provision about access to, and provision of, information about owners and controllers of land; to make provision about engaging communities in decisions relating to land; to enable certain persons to buy land to further sustainable development; to make provision for non-domestic rates to be levied on shootings and deer forests; to make provision about the change of use of common good land; to make provision about the management of deer on land; to make provision about access rights to land; to amend the law on agricultural holdings to provide for new forms of agricultural tenancy, to remove the requirement to register before tenants of certain holdings can exercise a right to buy, to provide a new power of sale where a landlord is in breach of certain obligations, to provide about rent reviews, to expand the list of the persons to whom holdings can be assigned or bequeathed and to whom holdings can be transferred on intestacy and to make provision about landlords’ objections to such successor tenants, to provide for certain holdings to be relinquished where landlords agree or assigned to persons new to or progressing in farming, to provide for a 3 year amnesty period in relation to certain improvements carried out by tenants, and to provide for notice of certain improvements proposed by landlords; and for connected purposes.
- Citation: 2016 asp 18
- Introduced by: Richard Lochhead, Cabinet Secretary for Rural Affairs, Food and Environment
- Territorial extent: Scotland

Dates
- Royal assent: 22 April 2016
- Commencement: various (Note: Section 130.)

Other legislation
- Amends: Local Government (Scotland) Act 1973; Law Reform (Miscellaneous Provisions) (Scotland) Act 1985; Crofters (Scotland) Act 1993; Deer (Scotland) Act 1996; Town and Country Planning (Scotland) Act 1997
- Relates to: Agricultural Holdings (Scotland) Act 1991; Land Reform (Scotland) Act 2003; Community Empowerment (Scotland) Act 2015

Status: Amended

History of passage through the Parliament

Text of statute as originally enacted

Revised text of statute as amended

Text of the Land Reform (Scotland) Act 2016 as in force today (including any amendments) within the United Kingdom, from legislation.gov.uk.

The Land Reform (Scotland) Act 2016 (asp 18) is an act of the Scottish Parliament which continues the process of land reform in Scotland following the Community Empowerment (Scotland) Act 2015. It is notable for granting Scottish ministers the power to force the sale of private land to community bodies to further sustainable development in the absence of a willing seller.

== Provisions ==
Under the provisions of the act there is to be a ‘Land Rights and Responsibilities Statement’, setting out the Scottish Government's objectives for land reform, a Scottish Land Commission is to take forward the land reform process, preparing a strategic plan, for the approval of Scottish ministers. One of the new land commissioners is to be a Tenant Farming Commissioner who must be neither an agricultural landlord nor a tenant but who is to be responsible for reviewing issues relating to tenant farming.

A further provision is the creation of the Community Right to Buy for Sustainable Development. This permits Scottish ministers to approve the purchase of privately owned land by a community body with a registered interest. Unlike the Community Right to Buy established by the Land Reform (Scotland) Act 2003 and extended by the Community Empowerment (Scotland) Act 2015, the Community Right to Buy for Sustainable Development does not require a willing seller but allows ministers to compel landowners to sell if they decide that the sale will further sustainable development in the area. In this respect it is similar to the Crofting Community Right to Buy of the 2003 Act which allows crofting communities to purchase croft land and the Community Right to Buy abandoned or derelict land of the 2015 Act, neither of which require a willing seller. Community bodies may also register an interest in allowing a 3rd party to purchase land on the same basis.

Other provisions of the act include new regulations to require persons who control land to be identified, with information obtained to appear in the Land Register of Scotland; the removal of sporting rights exemption from rates, which are to be re-valued; and further powers for Scottish Natural Heritage to control deer management. It also makes provision for notice and consultation where core paths are to be amended.

== See also ==
- Land Reform in Scotland
- Community Empowerment (Scotland) Act 2015
- Land Reform (Scotland) Act 2003
