= Scottish Land Commission =

- Scottish Gaelic: Coimisean Fearainn na h-Alba
- Scottish Land Commission logo

Agency overview
- Formed: 1 April 2017; 9 years ago
- Type: Executive non-departmental public body
- Jurisdiction: Scotland
- Headquarters: An Lòchran, 10 Inverness Campus, Inverness, IV2 5NA; 57.4876°N 4.2267°W
- Agency executives: Michael Russell, Chairman; Rob Black, Tenant Farming Commissioner
- Parent department: Scottish Government
- Key document: Land Reform (Scotland) Act 2016
- Website: landcommission.gov.scot

Map
- Scotland in the UK and Europe

The Scottish Land Commission (Scottish Gaelic: Coimisean Fearainn na h-Alba) was established by the Scottish Government following the passage of the Land Reform (Scotland) Act 2016 by the Scottish Parliament; the Commission also incorporates the work of the Tenant Farming Commissioner. The Lands Commissioners, who constitute the Commission, have functions relating to land in Scotland, so that they address issues which relate to ownership of land, land rights, management of land, and use of land. The Tenant Farming Commissioner has the aim of improving the relationship between tenant farmers and land owners, and can create codes of practice, provide practical guidance, and must consult on such matters. The Tenant Farming Commissioner cannot be an agricultural landlord or agricultural tenant, and will develop codes of practice which are in addition to the law and the jurisdiction of the Scottish Land Court.

The Scottish Land Commission is a body concerned with looking at the concentration of land ownership, land taxation, and effective use of land for the common good. The Commission will also provide some scrutiny of those laws and policies that relate to land within Scotland.

== History ==
In 2013 Richard Lochhead MSP, then Cabinet Secretary for Rural Affairs and the Environment, announced the launch of the Agricultural Holdings Review, which would examine the situation of land ownership and use, tenant-owner relationships, and all of the relevant legislation. The Review published its final report in January 2015, and the recommendations were put out to consultation.

In the final report Richard Lochead noted the importance of the relationships between landowners and tenants for the future of agriculture in Scotland, stating:

What we heard confirms to us that the future of the sector depends on productive relationships between tenants and landlords based on mutual trust, respect and confidence in the sector.

— Ministerial Forward, Review of Agricultural Holdings Legislation Final Report

Following the responses to the consultation the Scottish Government presented the Land Reform (Scotland) Bill to the Scottish Parliament on 22 June 2015. The Bill was passed by the Scottish Parliament on 16 March 2016, and received Royal Assent on 22 March 2016 becoming Land Reform (Scotland) Act 2016.

The Land Reform (Scotland) Bill was criticised during its passage by the Delegated Powers and Law Reform Committee of the Scottish Parliament on the basis that it granted a significant power to Scottish Minister to implement much of the details of the Act through secondary legislation and delegated powers. Turcan Connell identified concerns around the implementation of the Act and the amount of scrutiny the detailed law would receive.

On 1 March 2016 concerns were also raised by Scottish Land and Estates about the passage of the Land Reform Bill, the body that represents Scotland's rural landowners, who felt that the good that landowners did was ignored in favour of "being radical". Scottish Land and Estates, further asserted that how land is used is as important as who owns that land. Aileen McLeod MSP, as Minister for Environment, Climate Change and Land Reform addressed the members of Scottish Land and Estates, who recognised the expertise of land owners in managing land, affirming that the intention is bring about balance in the tenant/land owner relationship, and to ensure everyone who has stake in land ownership and management is involved. She stated the Bill was about spreading good practice around Scotland,

There are many good examples of communities and landowners working together for mutual benefit, and a key aim of the Bill will be to encourage wider adoption of good practice. ... I recognise the expertise and role of land owners in managing land, and the contribution that many landowners make to our economy at both a local and national level.

— Aileen McLeod, Speech to Scottish Land and Estates

Libby Brooks, writing in The Guardian newspaper on 17 March 2016, reported dissatisfaction with the new law from the Scottish Green Party for not being radical enough. Andy Wightman MSP, land reform spokesperson for the Scottish Green Party, was disappointed that the Land Reform (Scotland) Act did not outlaw the ownership of Scottish land by offshore companies in tax havens. Brooks also reported dissatisfaction that the Act does not restrict the amount of land that can be owned by any one individual.

The Commission was established by the Scottish Government on 1 November 2016 by The Land Reform (Scotland) Act 2016 (Commencement No. 2, and Transitory Provisions) Regulations 2016 made under the Land Reform (Scotland) Act 2016, with the Commission taking on functions from 1 April 2017 and 1 November 2017.

== Headquarters ==
It is headquartered at An Lòchran Inverness. There is a staff of around twenty: five Land Commissioners, the Tenant Farming Commissioner and support staff. The chief executive officer is Hamish Trench, a former chartered surveyor and Director at Cairngorms National Park Authority and Deer Commission for Scotland.

== Commissioners ==
=== Nomination ===
The first commissioners were proposed in November 2016: Andrew Thin, Professor David Adams, Lorne MacLeod, Sally Reynolds, Megan MacInnes and Bob McIntosh as the Tenant Farming Commissioner.

The nominated Commissioners were considered by the Environment, Climate Change, and Land Reform Committee of Scottish Parliament, which reported on 8 December 2016, recommending that the Scottish Parliament approve the appointment of the Commissioners. Nonetheless, the Committee did recommend that Bob McIntosh, proposed Tenant Farming Commissioner, should resign from membership of the Royal Institution of Chartered Surveyors to maintain the perception of impartiality; the Committee believed McIntosh was in good a position for building relationships with both landowners and tenants. The Committee also recommended that Lorne MacLeod stand down as Chairman of Community Land Scotland and as a director of community owned land on Eriskay, and asked the Scottish Government to provide a date for when appointments to the Commission would be regulated by the Commissioner for Ethical Standards in Public Life in Scotland.

The Report of the Environment, Climate Change, and Land Reform Committee was noted by the Scottish Parliament on 13 December 2016, and approved the appointment of the Land Commissioners (including the Tenant Farming Commissioner).

=== Chairman ===
The first chairman, Andrew Thin, was previously the Scottish Government's Independent Advisor on Tenant Farming, and was involved in the establishment of the Cairngorms National Park Authority and had previously worked for Scottish Natural Heritage.

=== Tenant Farming Commissioner ===
The Tenant Farming Commissioner cannot be an agricultural landlord or agricultural tenant, and will develop codes of practice which are in addition to the law and the jurisdiction of the Scottish Land Court. The Tenant Farming Commissioner has the power to investigate breaches of the codes of practice.

As reported in The Herald newspaper on 11 August 2016, Christopher Nicholson of the Scottish Tenant Farming Association stated that the creation of a Tenant Farming Commissioner had the support of both landowners and tenants. The Agriculture Holdings Review had identified examples of dysfunctional relationships between landlords and tenants, with Bob McIntosh stating,

The Agriculture Holdings Review identified examples of dysfunctional landlord/tenant relationships based on a ‘them and us’ culture, so a culture change towards a more mutually beneficial partnership approach would represent success.

— Bob McIntosh, Interview in The Scotsman - Co-operation is key for farm tenancy relationships

The Press and Journal newspaper, reported on 8 April 2017 that Bob McIntosh, the first Tenant Farming Commissioner, was hoping that the Codes of Practice he would develop would help tenants and landowners to resolve disputes without recourse to the Scottish Land Court. He stated that he would be able to investigate instances where a landlord or tenant had not complied with the Codes of Practice, following the lodging of a formal complaint.
