= David Aaronovitch =

English journalist and author (born 1954)

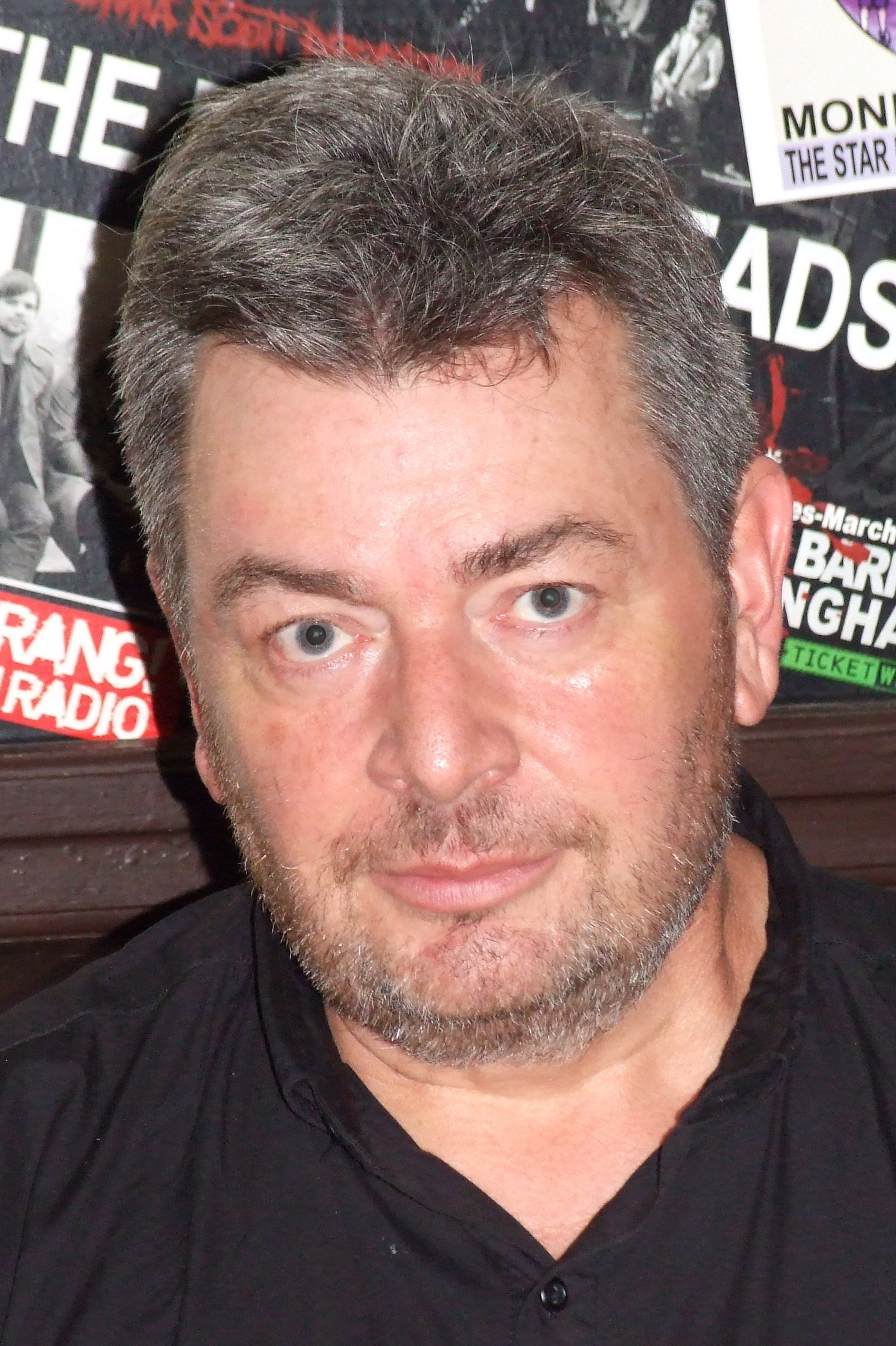
- David Aaronovitch at Guildford Skeptics in the Pub in July 2012
- Born: David Morris Aaronovitch; 8 July 1954 (age 72); Hampstead, London, England
- Education: Balliol College, Oxford; University of Manchester
- Occupations: Journalist; broadcaster; author
- Children: 3
- Father: Sam Aaronovitch
- Relatives: Owen Aaronovitch (brother); Ben Aaronovitch (brother)
- Awards: Columnist of the Year; Orwell Prize for Political Journalism

David Morris Aaronovitch (born 8 July 1954) is an English journalist, television presenter and author. He is the author of Paddling to Jerusalem: An Aquatic Tour of Our Small Country (2000), Voodoo Histories: the role of Conspiracy Theory in Modern History (2009) and Party Animals: My Family and Other Communists (2016). He won the Orwell Prize for political journalism in 2001, and the What the Papers Say "Columnist of the Year" award in 2003. He previously wrote for The Independent, The Guardian and The Times.

== Early life and education ==
Aaronovitch is the son of communist intellectual and economist Sam Aaronovitch, and brother of actor Owen Aaronovitch and author and screenwriter Ben Aaronovitch. His parents were atheists whose "faith was Marxism", according to Aaronovitch. He is ethnically half Jewish and half English. He has written that he was brought up "to react to wealth with a puritanical pout".

Aaronovitch attended Gospel Oak Primary School until 1965, Holloway County Comprehensive (now Holloway School) until 1968, and William Ellis School from 1968 to 1972, all in London. He studied modern history at Balliol College, Oxford. Aaronovitch completed his education at the Victoria University of Manchester, graduating in 1978 with a 2:1 BA (Hons) in history.

While at Manchester, Aaronovitch was a member of the 1975 University Challenge team that lost in the first round after answering most questions with the name of a Marxist ("Trotsky", "Lenin", "Karl Marx" or "Che Guevara"). The tactics were a protest against the fact that Oxford and Cambridge were allowed to enter each of their colleges into the contest as a separate team, even though the colleges were not universities in themselves.

Aaronovitch was initially a Eurocommunist and was active in the National Union of Students. There he got to know the president at the time, Charles Clarke, who later became Home Secretary. Aaronovitch himself succeeded Trevor Phillips as president of the union from 1980 to 1982. He was elected on a Left Alliance ticket.

== Career in journalism ==
Aaranovitch began his media career in the early 1980s as a television researcher and later producer for the ITV programme Weekend World. In 1988, he began working for the BBC as founding editor of the political current affairs programme On the Record.

He moved to print journalism in 1995, working for The Independent and The Independent on Sunday as chief leader writer, television critic, parliamentary sketch writer, and columnist until the end of 2002.

He began contributing to The Guardian and The Observer in 2003 as a columnist and feature writer. Aaronovitch's columns appeared in The Guardian's G2 section. His desire for his pieces to appear on the main comment pages, according to Peter Wilby, was reportedly vetoed by the section editor, Seumas Milne, although Aaronovitch himself does not know if Milne was involved in the decision. From June 2005, he wrote a regular column for The Times. He was let go in March 2023, the stated reason being a desire on the part of the editor for "new ideas". His replacement was Juliet Samuel, formerly of The Telegraph.

Aaronovitch has also been a columnist for The Jewish Chronicle. In addition, he has written for a variety of other major British news and opinion publications, such as the New Statesman. He has written for New Humanist, and is an "honorary associate" of its publisher, the Rationalist Association.

Aaronovitch also presents or contributes to radio and television programmes, including the BBC's Have I Got News for You and BBC News 24. In 2004 he presented The Norman Way, a three-part BBC Radio 4 documentary looking at régime change in 1066.

Aaronovitch also hosted the BBC series The Blair Years (2007), which examined the prime ministership of Tony Blair. Some journalists were unimpressed with Aaronovitch or dismissed the series.

== Political views ==
Aaronovitch said the case had "been made" for the 2003 invasion of Iraq and that he "reluctantly support[ed] military action", his "biggest reason" being "the failure of 'vigilant containment' to help the people of Iraq". Since the invasion he has maintained the view that it liberated Iraqis, and has played down the significance of Iraq's putative weapons of mass destruction. However, he wrote in 2003: "If nothing is eventually found, I – as a supporter of the war – will never believe another thing that I am told by our government, or that of the US ever again. And, more to the point, neither will anyone else. Those weapons had better be there somewhere." On 7 September 2018, he labelled people who ask him about the article "lamebrains". He remains a strong supporter of former Prime Minister Tony Blair.

In late 2005, Aaronovitch was co-author, with Oliver Kamm and journalist Francis Wheen, of a complaint to The Guardian, after it published an apology to Noam Chomsky for an interview by Emma Brockes, in which she asserted that Chomsky had denied the Srebrenica massacre. A Guardian readers' editor found that the newspaper had misrepresented Chomsky's position on the Srebrenica massacre, and that judgement was upheld in May 2006 by an external ombudsman, John Willis.

In his column of 5 September 2013, Aaronovitch criticized the Labour leader Ed Miliband for allegedly providing no alternative to military intervention in Syria, after the use of chemical weapons in the Ghouta attacks of 21 August 2013. For Aaronovitch, "politically [Miliband] is not a presence at all, he is an absence" and "is neither hunter nor prey, he is scavenger. He is a political vulture."

During 2013, though Aaronovitch had vigorously supported the bombing campaigns against Iraq, Libya, and Syria, he became the chairman of the human rights organisation Index on Censorship, succeeding Jonathan Dimbleby in the role.

In May 2014, he criticised Glenn Greenwald's involvement in the Edward Snowden NSA revelations, and characterised Greenwald as "a stilted writer of overlong, dishonest and repetitive polemics." In response to Aaronovitch's article in an interview with Media Lens Greenwald commented on "the hilarious, inane irony of having someone who publicly cheered for the worst political crime of this generation – the attack on Iraq – trying to deny other people “journalist” status on the ground that they seek to “change the world” rather than simply report."

In August 2014, Aaronovitch was one of 200 public figures who were signatories to a letter to The Guardian expressing their hope that Scotland would vote to remain part of the United Kingdom in September's referendum on that issue.

In 2016, he endorsed the United Kingdom's continued membership of the European Union in the 23 June referendum. Aaronovitch later said that Brexit would eventually be reversed as the number of older voters, who typically voted for Britain to leave the European Union, gradually die.

On 1 July 2024, Aaronovitch sparked controversy after tweeting on X, "If I were Biden, I'd hurry up and have Trump murdered on the basis that he is a threat to America's security #SCOTUS". Donald Trump was the subject of an assassination attempt just 11 days later. Aaronovitch alleged that his referring to murdering Trump was "plainly a satire".

== Personal life ==
Aaronovitch lives in London with his wife and three daughters.

In 2011, Aaronovitch was the victim of a "medical accident" following routine surgery. He survived sepsis thanks to antibiotics, a treatment that was not available to his grandmother, who died of an infection following an insect bite in 1930. This experience led him to become an advocate for Antibiotic Research UK and the charity's work to promote proper antibiotic use and the development of new antibiotics.

== Works ==
- Paddling to Jerusalem: An Aquatic Tour of Our Small Country (Fourth Estate, 2000) ISBN 978-1-84115-540-1
- No Excuses for Terror, a 45-minute documentary film that "criticizes how the anti-Israel views of the far-left and far-right have permeated the mainstream media and political discourse."
- Blaming the Jews, a 45-minute documentary film that evaluates anti-Semitism in Arab media and culture.
- God and the Politicians, 28 September 2005, a documentary film that looks at the important question of the increasing religious influence on politics in the UK
- Voodoo Histories: The Role of Conspiracy Theory in Shaping Modern History, Jonathan Cape, 2009, ISBN 978-0-224-07470-4 Published in the US in 2010 by Riverhead Books, ISBN 978-1-59448-895-5
- Party Animals: My Family and Other Communists. Jonathan Cape, 2016.

Political offices
Preceded by Trevor Phillips	President of the National Union of Students; 1980-82	Succeeded by Neil Stewart
