= The Norman Way =

The Norman Way is a three-part radio documentary looking at regime change in England at the time of the Norman Conquest. Presented by the author and journalist David Aaronovitch, it was broadcast in May to June 2004 on BBC Radio 4.
