= Community Land Scotland =

Community Land Scotland is a charity and membership organisation for community landowners and aspiring community landowners. It was founded in 2010 to represent the interests of community landowners, promote legislation which empowers communities and provide a point of contact for community bodies interested in community land ownership.

Its members are estimated to own approximately 560,000 acres of land in the country.

== Objectives ==
Community Land Scotland states its main objectives as follows:

- Facilitate the exchange of information, enabling groups to learn from each other's experience and successes
- Promote the growing importance of the community landowning sector to Scotland
- Reform The Land Reform (Scotland) Act 2003 to simplify and strengthen powers to communities
- Encourage community groups to register an interest in land
- Work with communities to ease the process of communities taking ownership of public land

== See also ==
- Land Reform in Scotland
