= Tenements (Scotland) Act 2004 =

Devolved Scottish legislation

- Act of the Scottish Parliament
- Scottish Parliament
- Long title: An Act of the Scottish Parliament to make provision about the boundaries and pertinents of properties comprised in tenements and for the regulation of the rights and duties of the owners of properties comprised in tenements; to make minor amendments of the Title Conditions (Scotland) Act 2003 (asp 9); and for connected purposes.
- Citation: 2004 asp 11
- Introduced by: Margaret Curran, Minister for Communities
- Territorial extent: Scotland

Dates
- Royal assent: 22 October 2004
- Commencement: 28 November 2004

Other legislation
- Relates to: Abolition of Feudal Tenure etc. (Scotland) Act 2000; Title Conditions (Scotland) Act 2003

Status: Current legislation

History of passage through the Parliament

Text of statute as originally enacted

Revised text of statute as amended

The Tenements (Scotland) Act 2004 (asp 11) is an act of the Scottish Parliament which is the main source of the law of the tenement, which regulates tenement flats.

The act is part of a package of land reforms together with the Abolition of Feudal Tenure etc. (Scotland) Act 2000 and the Title Conditions (Scotland) Act 2003, all of which commenced on 28 November 2004.

== Passage in Parliament ==
The Bill was introduced to the Scottish Parliament on 30 January 2004 by then Communities Minister Margaret Curran, and supported by Justice Minister Cathy Jamieson and Deputy Communities Minister Mary Mulligan.

== Substantive provisions ==
The act allows maintenance of common properties to be carried out where a majority of owners are supportive of the work.

Section 26 of the act defines a tenement as two or more related but separate flats divided from each other horizontally. The definition is framed broadly in order to include not only traditional tenement properties, but also four-in-a-block houses and larger houses which have been subdivided.

=== Ownership ===
The act contains a number of provisions affecting ownership of various parts of a tenement building:

- s.2(3) provides that the owner of a top-floor flat shall own the roof and loft space over that flat.
- s.2(4) provides that the owner of a ground-floor flat shall own the solum (ground) beneath that flat. It is also long-accepted law that the owner of the ground-floor flat owns the solum before and behind that flat.
- s.2(5) provides that the close, which is in common ownership, includes the solum beneath and roof above the close.
- s.2(6) provides that the proprietor of the solum of any part of the property shall also own all the air space above this, including that above the top-floor flat's roof; however s.2(7) includes within ownership of the roof any air space above a slope in the roof below the highest point of the roof.
- s.3 attaches a right of common property in a close or lift to each flat served by that close or lift.

=== Duties ===
The act restates in statute the common law of common interest in its application to tenement properties. Owners are obliged under s.8 to maintain any part of their property which provides support or shelter to another part of the building, and are forbidden under s.9 from doing anything to their property which would impair the support or shelter provided to, or the natural light enjoyed by, any part of the building.

=== Demolition ===
The act contains a number of provision to protect owners' interest in the event of demolition.

- s.20 provides that ownership rights, including in pertinent land, shall not be affected by demolition of the building; this means that, if a tenement building is demolished, individual flat-owners will retain ownership of the air space their flat previously occupied, as well as any interest they had in land which served the flat, e.g. a close or driveway.
- s.21 provides for the equal distribution of the profits of demolition between owners, except where there is such disparity in the size of flats that the largest flat in the building was more than one-and-a-half times larger than the smallest, in which case the profits are divided in proportion to the size of individual apartments.
- s.22 places restrictions on the use of land on which a tenement formerly stood when separate owners retain ownership interests in the site.
- s.23 allows an owner of an abandoned tenement in certain circumstances to apply for permission to sell the tenement.

== Further developments ==
In 2022, the Scottish Law Commission reviewed the legislation.

== See also ==
- Land Reform in Scotland
