= Scottish Outdoor Access Code =

Legal guidance on right to roam in Scotland

Logo used for the Scottish Outdoor Access Code.

The Scottish Outdoor Access Code provides detailed guidance on the exercise of the ancient tradition of universal access to land in Scotland, which was formally codified by the Land Reform (Scotland) Act 2003. Under Scots law everyone has the right to be on most land and inland water for recreation, education and going from place to place providing they act responsibly. The basis of access rights in Scotland is one of shared responsibilities, in that those exercising such rights have to act responsibly, whilst landowners and managers have a reciprocal responsibility to respect the interests of those who exercise their rights. The code provides detailed guidance on these responsibilities.

Access rights apply to most land regardless of whether it is owned by the state, private individuals, companies, or voluntary and charitable bodies. The rights covers any non-motorised activity, including walking, cycling, horse-riding and camping, and also allow access on inland water for canoeing, rowing, sailing and swimming. The rights confirmed in the Scottish legislation are greater than the limited rights of access created in England and Wales by the Countryside and Rights of Way Act 2000.

The Code has been approved by both the Scottish Government and the Scottish Parliament. It is expected to provide sufficient guidance to ensure that most access problems can be resolved by reference to it. Failure to comply with the Code is not, in of itself, an offence, however where a dispute cannot be resolved and is referred to the courts for determination, the sheriff will consider whether the guidance in the Code has been disregarded by any of the parties.

== Historical background ==
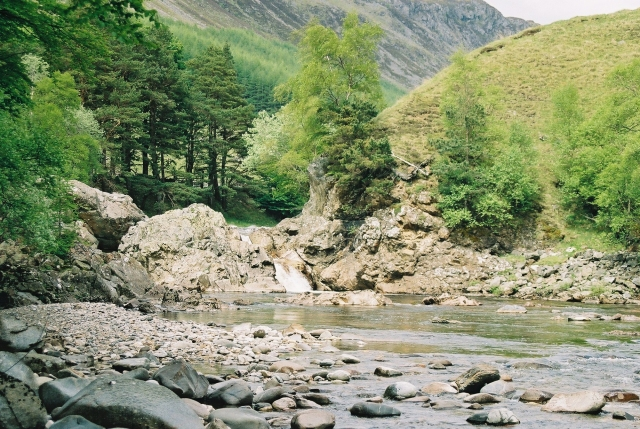
In 1846 Glen Tilt was the scene of a confrontation over the right of access to land in Scotland.

The majority of land (at least 57%) in Scotland is privately owned, and around half of the country's rural land is owned by fewer than 500 landowners. There has, however, been a longstanding tradition of access to land. Until the mid-nineteenth century, the ability to access land was little challenged; however, this began to change with the rise of deer stalking as a commercial enterprise, and the increase in the number of people visiting the highlands following the coming of the railways. In 1846, the 6th Duke of Atholl attempted to prevent a group of botany students from the University of Edinburgh from entering Glen Tilt, however the resulting court case confirmed that access could not be prevented. The Trespass (Scotland) Act 1865 imposed fines on camping and the lighting of fires without the landowner's permission, but was largely ignored, and, throughout the nineteenth and twentieth centuries, the basic legal position on access remained that there was no legal right of access, but equally no legal mechanism for landowners to prevent it.

In 1996, organisations representing walking and mountaineering interests came together with land management and government bodies to draft Scotland's Hills and Mountains: A Concordat on Access, a voluntary code that sought to balance the interests of both access users and land managers. The concordat spoke of the need for access to be exercised responsibly and, in some ways, can be seen as a forerunner to the modern Code, although it lacked legal status, and did not address access rights to inland waters.

In 2003, a formal right to access was put into law via the Land Reform (Scotland) Act 2003. The act stated that "a person has access rights only if they are exercised responsibly", and tasked Scottish Natural Heritage with producing the Code so as to provide guidance to both access users and land managers on what behavior would be considered "responsible".

== Principles and responsibilities ==
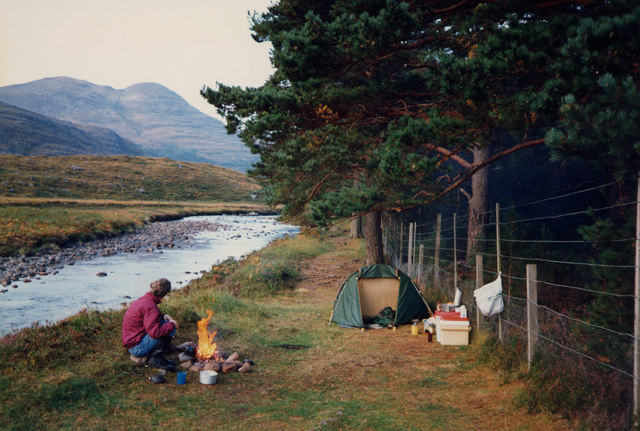
Camping, as shown here in Glen Torridon, is permitted on most land in Scotland under the code.

The code is based on three key principles which apply equally to the public and to land managers:

1. Respect the interests of other people.
2. Care for the environment.
3. Take responsibility for your own actions.

— Scottish Outdoor Access Code. pp. 1–2.

Responsibilities are separated into those that apply to access users, and those that apply to land managers. The code provides further guidance with examples under each point. The responsibilities of access users are:

1. Take personal responsibility for your own actions.
2. Respect people's privacy and peace of mind.
3. Help land managers and others to work safely and effectively.
4. Care for your environment.
5. Keep your dog under proper control.
6. Take extra care if you are organising an event or running a business.

— Scottish Outdoor Access Code. pp. 17–19.

The responsibilities of land managers are:

1. Respect access rights in managing your land or water.
2. Act reasonably when asking people to avoid land management operations.
3. Work with your local authority and other bodies to help integrate access and land management.
4. Take account of access rights if you manage contiguous land or water.

— Scottish Outdoor Access Code. pp. 53–54.

== Activities permitted ==
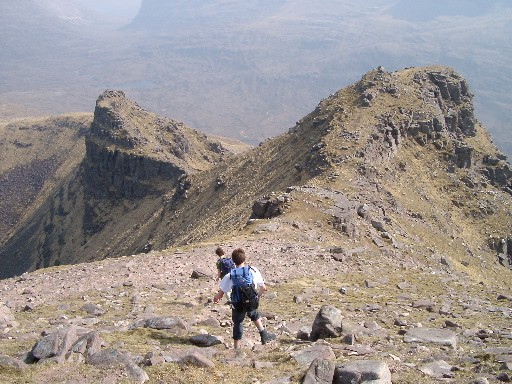
Hillwalkers descending from the summit of Beinn Dearg.

The code states that access rights can be exercised for recreational purposes, some educational activities and certain commercial purposes, and for crossing over land and water.

Recreational purposes are not defined in legislation, however the code gives examples of activities that may be taken to be included. These include outdoor activities, such as walking, cycling, horse riding, carriage driving, rock climbing, hill-walking, running, orienteering, ski touring, ski mountaineering, caving, canoeing, kayaking, outdoor swimming, rowing, windsurfing, sailing, diving, and air sports such as paragliding. Less active pastimes such watching wildlife, sightseeing, painting, photography, visiting historic sites, dog walking (provided the dog is under close control), picnics, playing, sledging, paddling and kite flying are also listed as examples of permitted recreational purposes.

Education purposes are defined as "activities concerned with furthering a person's understanding of the natural or cultural heritage". An example given in the code is that of a teacher taking a group of students outside to study wildlife or visit a geological feature. Field surveys of natural or cultural heritage are also covered under this definition. Access rights also extend to activities carried out commercially, but only where the activity could also be carried out on a non-commercial basis. An example given is that of a mountain guide who is taking a client out on a commercial basis: this activity is permitted because the activity involved could be done by anybody exercising their access rights in the normal manner.

Access rights do not extend to motorised activities such as motor cycling, off-road driving, or the use of any powered craft on water: this restriction includes microlight aircraft and the use of powered models and drones. An exception to the restriction on motorised vehicles is that a person with a disability may use a motorised vehicle or vessel built or adapted for use by that person (e.g. a motorised wheelchair). Access rights do not include the right to hunt, shoot or fish, as these activities can only be undertaken with the permission of the person owning the appropriate rights (this may be the landowner, but the rights to undertake such activities can be owned or rented separately); nor do they extend to the carrying of a firearm, except where the person is crossing land or water in order to gain access to a place where they hold shooting rights. Gathering items such as mushrooms or berries for commercial gain is not covered by access rights; but the customary picking of wild fungi and berries for personal consumption is not prohibited under the code.

Access rights must be undertaken in lawful manner, and thus by definition criminal acts are excluded. The code includes an annex listing some of the most relevant pieces of legislation, such as those relating to the control of dogs and the protection of wildlife.

Access rights can be exercised at day or night. However additional care must be taken to respect people's privacy and peace of mind at night by staying well away from buildings and using paths and tracks wherever possible. Wild camping, defined as lightweight camping by small numbers of people staying no more than two or three nights in any one place, is permitted under the code. Camping in this manner is permissible wherever access rights apply, but campers are advised not to camp in enclosed fields, and to keep well away from buildings, roads and historic structures. It should also be noted that legislation governing Scheduled Monuments prevents camping near such sites without specific consent from Historic Environment Scotland.

The code requires that campers leave no trace, and must take away all litter, remove all traces of the tent pitch and of any open fire, and not cause any pollution. In 2017 the Loch Lomond and the Trossachs National Park introduced byelaws restricting the right to camp along much of the shoreline of Loch Lomond, due to issues such as litter and anti-social behaviour that were blamed on some irresponsible campers. Camping around many of the lochs within the national park is now restricted to designated areas, and campers are required to purchase a permit to camp within these areas between March and October. The byelaws were opposed by groups such as Mountaineering Scotland and Ramblers Scotland, who argued that they would criminalise camping even where it was carried out responsibly, and that the national park authority already had sufficient powers to address irresponsible behaviour using existing laws.

== Land to which access rights apply ==
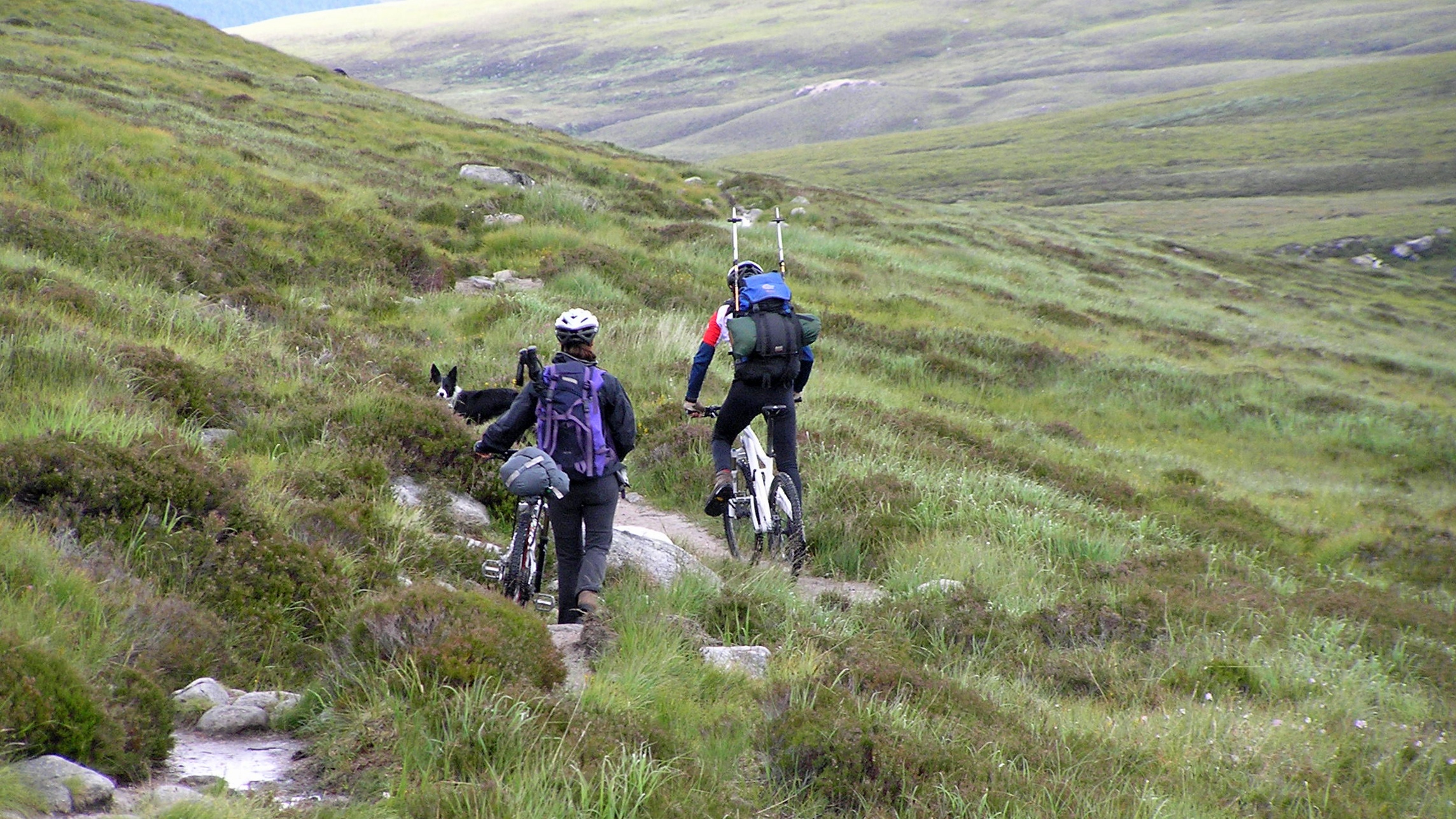
Mountain bikers on the Mar Lodge Estate in the Cairngorms.

Responsible access under the access code can be enjoyed over the majority of land in Scotland, including all uncultivated land such as hills, mountains, moorland, woods and forests. Access rights also apply to fields in which crops have not been sown or in which there are farm animals grazing; where crops are growing or have been sown access rights are restricted to the margins of those fields.

Access rights do not extend to the land surrounding a house or other dwelling (e.g. a static caravan) to the extent needed to provide residents with a reasonable measures of privacy. This is usually defined as the garden around or adjacent to the house that is intensively managed for the enjoyment of residents.

The question of how much land surrounding a dwelling is required to provide "reasonable measures of privacy" has been the main issue on which the courts have been asked to intervene. In Gloag v. Perth and Kinross Council the sheriff allowed about 5.7 hectares (14 acres) surrounding Kinfauns Castle, a property belonging to Ann Gloag, to be excluded from access rights. In Snowie v Stirling Council and the Ramblers' Association the courts allowed about 5.3 hectares (13 acres) to be excluded, but refused permission for a wider area to be excluded and required the landowner to keep the driveway unlocked to allow access.

Access rights also do not extend to the curtilage of any other building (such as a factory, office or hotel). Generally, such land will normally be closely connected, physically and in terms of purpose, to the building and forming one enclosure with it.

Access rights apply to most urban parks, country parks and other managed open spaces, but an exception is made for visitor attractions (e.g. gardens and safari parks) where the public has historically had to pay to enter. Access rights do apply to grass playing fields and land laid out for sport and recreation (including the fairways of a golf course), but only when the exercise of access rights does not interfere with the carrying on of that recreational use (for example the public may cross a golf course, but must not interfere with a game of golf). Areas of grass that are specially managed for sport (for example golf greens, bowling greens and cricket squares) are excluded from access rights, as are sports pitches made of artificial materials.

Access rights extend to inland water such as rivers, lochs, canals and reservoirs in order to allow swimming and other non-motorised watersports. However requirements to respect the rights of people on nearby land may affect the routes and areas of water that can reasonably be used. These rights extend to grant access to riverbanks, loch shores, beaches, and coastline (except where such land is excluded due to other provisions, such the requirement to provide a reasonable measure of privacy). Shore access rights do not extend to driving or parking any vehicles needed to enable watersports.

Some places of work such as railway, airfields, airports, quarries, civil engineering and demolition sites are excluded, as is land contiguous to any school and used by that school. There are also some areas of land where public access can be prohibited, excluded or restricted under other legislation. Land may also be temporarily exempted from access rights through an order made by the local authority, for example to allow for an event such as a music festival or car rally. Land owners/managers may also temporarily restrict access rights to enable safe operation of the land, for example banning dogs from a field where sheep are lambing or stopping people walking through an area where trees are being felled. However guidelines recommend signposting the reason for, and duration of, the restriction and an alternate route.

== Notes ==
=== Bibliography ===
- "Scottish Outdoor Access Code" (PDF). www.outdooraccess-scotland.scot. Scottish Natural Heritage. 2005.
- Ian Mitchell (2004). Scotland's Mountains Before the Mountaineers. Luath Press. ISBN 0-946487-39-1.

== See also ==
- The Country Code
- Freedom to roam
