= Title Conditions (Scotland) Act 2003 =

Act of the Scottish Parliament

Title Conditions (Scotland) Act 2003 (Note: Section 129(1).)
- Act of the Scottish Parliament
- Scottish Parliament
- Long title: An Act of the Scottish Parliament to make further provision as respects real burdens, servitudes and certain other obligations affecting land; to amend the law relating to the ranking of standard securities; and for connected purposes.
- Citation: 2003 asp 9
- Territorial extent: Scotland

Dates
- Royal assent: 3 April 2003
- Commencement: various (Note: Section 129(2)–(5).)

Other legislation
- Amends: Registration Act 1617; Titles to Land Consolidation (Scotland) Act 1868; Crofters (Scotland) Act 1993
- Repeals/revokes: Redemptions Act 1661
- Relates to: Abolition of Feudal Tenure etc. (Scotland) Act 2000; Tenements (Scotland) Act 2004

Status: Amended

Text of statute as originally enacted

Revised text of statute as amended

Text of the Title Conditions (Scotland) Act 2003 as in force today (including any amendments) within the United Kingdom, from legislation.gov.uk.

The Title Conditions (Scotland) Act 2003 (asp 9) is an act of the Scottish Parliament. It came into force on 28 November 2004, and is one element of a three part land reform abolishing feudal tenure and modernising Scottish property law, the other two elements being the Abolition of Feudal Tenure etc. (Scotland) Act 2000 and Tenements (Scotland) Act 2004 which came into effect on the same date.

== Provisions ==
The legislation primarily relates to real burdens, a key aspect of property law in Scotland, and defines them in section 1 of the act as "an encumbrance on land constituted in favour of the owner of other land in that person’s capacity as owner of that other land". Section 2 of the act specifies that a real burden must involve an obligation either to do something, or to refrain from doing something, relating to the property in question. The act provides a legal basis for real burdens in light of the abolition of feudal tenure.

The act established "title conditions" as a generic term for servitudes, conditions in long leases, and other obligations which are capable of variation or discharge by the Lands Tribunal.

The act completed the abolition of the feudal system.

== Further developments ==
The Scottish Law Commission published a draft bill following a consultation on improving section 53 of the act.

== See also ==
- Land Reform in Scotland
