= Land Reform (Scotland) Act 2003 =

Act of the Scottish Parliament

Land Reform (Scotland) Act 2003 (Note: Section 100(1).)
- Act of the Scottish Parliament
- Scottish Parliament
- Long title: An Act of the Scottish Parliament to establish statutory public rights of access to land for recreational and other purposes, and to extend some of the provisions for that purpose to rights of way and other rights; to make provision under which bodies representing rural and crofting communities may buy the land with which those communities have a connection; and for connected purposes.
- Citation: 2003 asp 2
- Territorial extent: Scotland

Dates
- Royal assent: 25 February 2003
- Commencement: various (Note: Section 100(3)–(4).)

Other legislation
- Amends: Trespass (Scotland) Act 1865; Town and Country Planning (Scotland) Act 1997
- Amended by: Digital Economy Act 2017
- Relates to: Community Empowerment (Scotland) Act 2015; Land Reform (Scotland) Act 2016

Status: Amended

Text of statute as originally enacted

Revised text of statute as amended

Text of the Land Reform (Scotland) Act 2003 as in force today (including any amendments) within the United Kingdom, from legislation.gov.uk.

The Land Reform (Scotland) Act 2003 (asp 2) is an act of the Scottish Parliament which establishes statutory public rights of access to land and makes provisions under which bodies representing rural and crofting communities may buy land.

== Provisions ==
The 2003 act includes three main provisions: the creation of a legal framework for land access, the community right to buy, and the crofting community right to buy.

The first part of the act codifies into Scots law the universal right to responsible access to land in Scotland. The act specifically establishes a right to be on land for recreational, educational and certain other purposes and a right to cross land. This is subject to restrictions on certain types of land, as laid out in section 6 of the Act, which includes contained structures and compounds, land adjacent to a residential property, school property, private communal gardens, fields in which crops have been sown or are growing, sports fields, and construction sites. Further to this, the rights exist only if they are exercised in a responsible manner, to which the Scottish Outdoor Access Code provides guidance on. Access rights apply to any non-motorised activities, including walking, cycling, horse-riding and wild camping. They also allow access on inland water for canoeing, rowing, sailing and swimming.

The second part of the act establishes the community right to buy, allowing communities with populations of up to 10,000 to register an interest in land, entitling them to first right of refusal should the owner put the land up for sale or intend to transfer ownership, provided a representative community body can be formed to carry out the purchase.

Finally, the third part establish the crofting community right to buy which allows crofting communities to purchase crofts and associated land from existing landowners. It differs from the community right to buy in that it can be exercised at any time, regardless of whether the land has been put on the market, allowing crofting communities to purchase land even in the absence of a willing seller.

== Reception ==
The Conservative spokesperson, Bill Aitken, criticised the legislation, comparing it to the actions of Robert Mugabe.

== See also ==
- Land reform in Scotland
- Community Empowerment (Scotland) Act 2015
- Land Reform (Scotland) Act 2016
