= Local Economy (journal) =

- Discipline: Economic Development
- Language: English
- Edited by: Andrew Jones

Publication details
- History: 1986; 40 years ago – present
- Publisher: SAGE Publications
- Frequency: 8/year

Standard abbreviations
- ISO 4: Local Econ.

Indexing
- ISSN: 0269-0942 (print); 1470-9325 (web)
- OCLC no.: 423613044

Links
- Journal homepage; Online access; Online archive

Local Economy is a peer-reviewed academic journal publishing papers on local economic development. The journal is published by SAGE Publications in association with the Local Economy Policy Unit (London South Bank University). The editor-in-chief is Andrew Jones (London South Bank University). The journal was established in 1986 and is published eight times per year.

== Abstracting and indexing ==
Local Economy is abstracted and indexed in the Association of Business Schools' Academic Journal Quality Guide, Research Papers in Economics, and Scopus.
