= Dewar's =

Scotch whisky brand

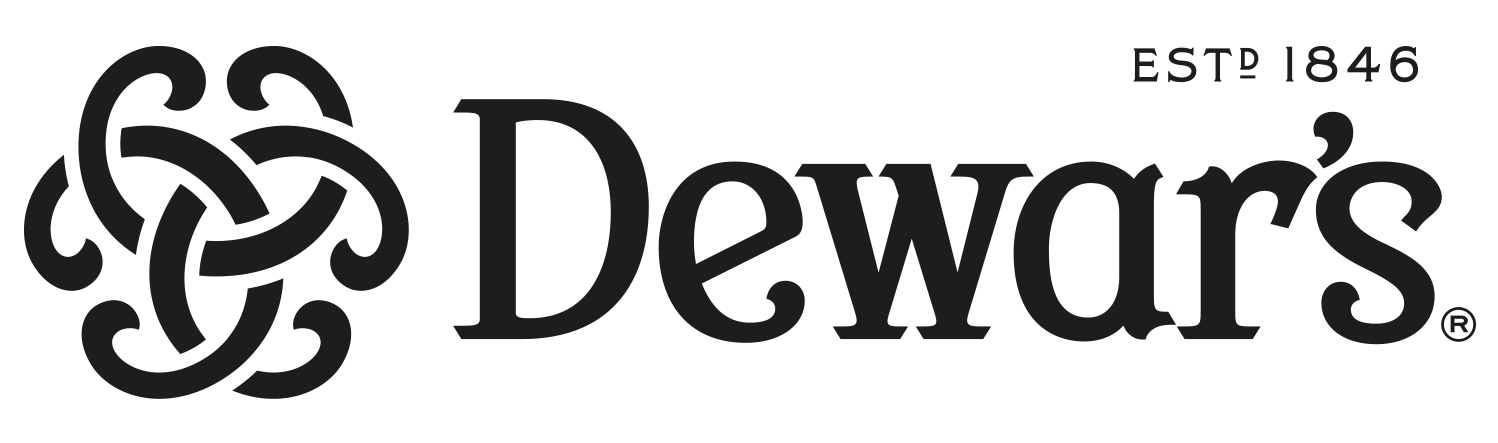

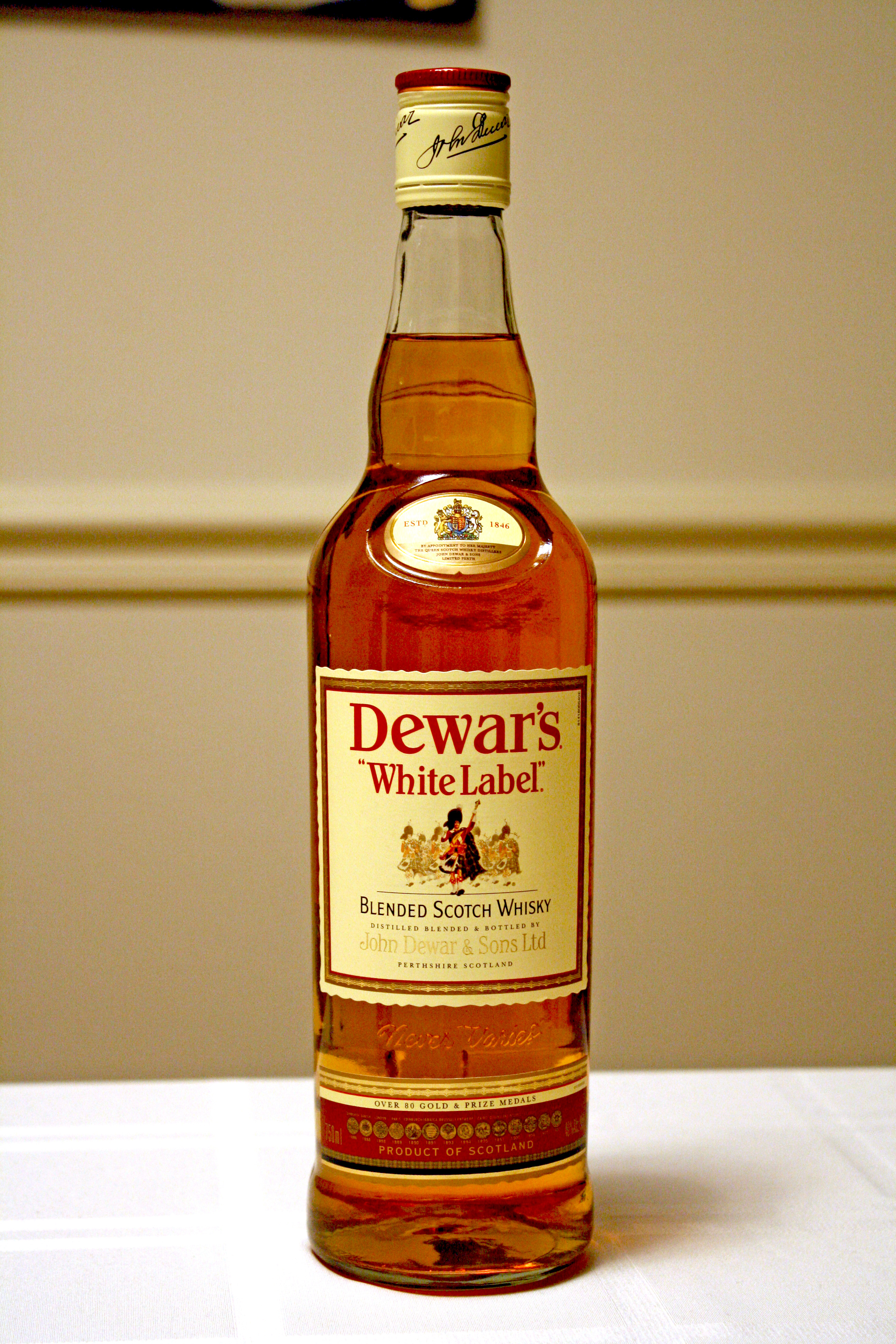
- Type: Scotch Whisky
- Manufacturer: John Dewar & Sons (Bacardi)
- Origin: Scotland
- Introduced: 1846
- Alcohol by volume: 40%
- Variants: White Label, Dewar's Scratched Cask, Dewar's 12, Dewar's 15, Dewar's 18, Dewar's Signature
- Website: www.dewars.com

Dewar's (/ˈdjuːərz/) is a brand of blended Scotch whisky manufactured by John Dewar & Sons, Ltd., a unit of Bacardi Ltd.

== History ==
The Dewar's whisky brand was created by John Dewar, Sr. in 1846. Under the control of his two sons, John A. Dewar Jr. and Thomas "Tommy" Dewar, the brand expanded to become a global market leader by 1896 and began to win several awards, including a gold medal in the 1904 St. Louis World's Fair. Tommy became famous as the author of a travel journal, Ramble Round the Globe, which documented his travels while publicizing the Dewar name. Dewar's eventually expanded their product by constructing the Aberfeldy Distillery in 1896.

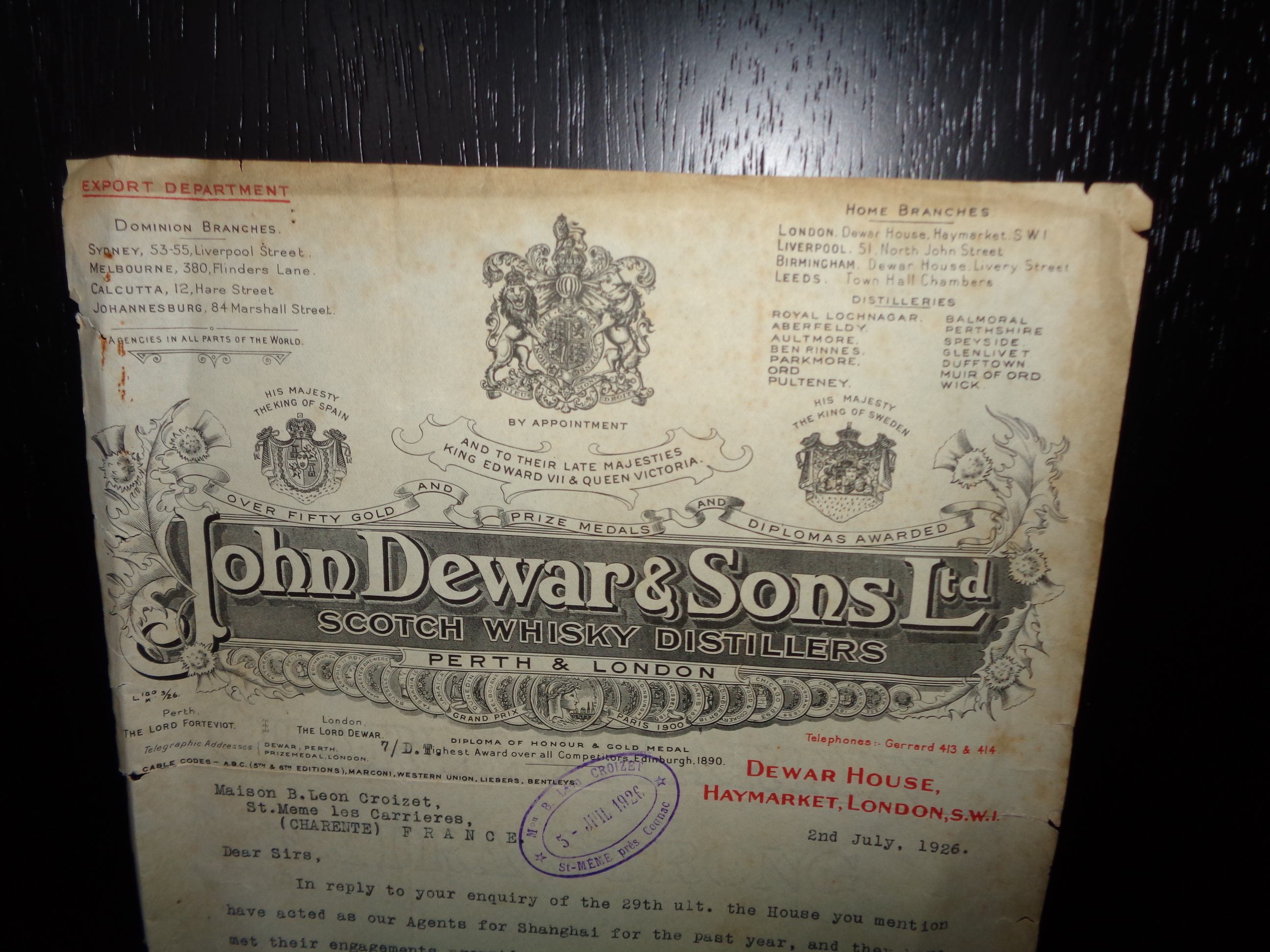
John Dewar & Sons 1926 client correspondence with watermark on document

Dewar's rose to prominence in the United States when Andrew Carnegie requested a small keg of Dewar's Scotch whisky be sent to the White House for President James Garfield's inauguration. Carnegie also sent the same gift to President Benjamin Harrison on his inauguration eight years later.

In 1987, numerous cases of still perfect Dewar's Scotch were recovered by underwater archaeologist E. Lee Spence from the shipwreck of the SS Regina, which sank in Lake Huron in 1913.

In 1998, Diageo sold John Dewar & Sons, Ltd. to Bacardi.

In June 2023, the brand received a major honour at the International Whisky Competition, with the "Master Blender of the Year" award being given to Stephanie Macleod.

== Notable processes ==
Dewar's pioneered the process of "marrying" the whisky in oak casks to allow the blend to age as one within the casks. After the blend is created, the whisky is returned to an oak cask and aged even further to obtain a smooth, robust finish.

== Dewar's products ==
- Dewar's White Label – Created in 1899 by John Dewar & Son's first Master Blender, A.J. Cameron. It has become the company's top-selling variation.
- Dewar's 12 – 12 years old. The blend was created by Dewar's sixth master blender, Tom Aitken. This offering has received some awards at international Spirit ratings competitions. From the San Francisco World Spirits Competition, it has received several double gold, gold and silver medals.
- Dewar's 15 – 15 years old. The blend was created by the current, and first female, Dewar's Master Blender Stephanie Macleod.
- Dewar's 18 – 18 years old. First released in 2003 and created by Master Blender Tom Aitken.
- Dewar's 19 – 19 years old Champion Edition created by Master Blender Stephanie Macleod; released and retired in the same year, 2021.
- Dewar's Signature – First created in 2003 by Master Blender Tom Aitken.

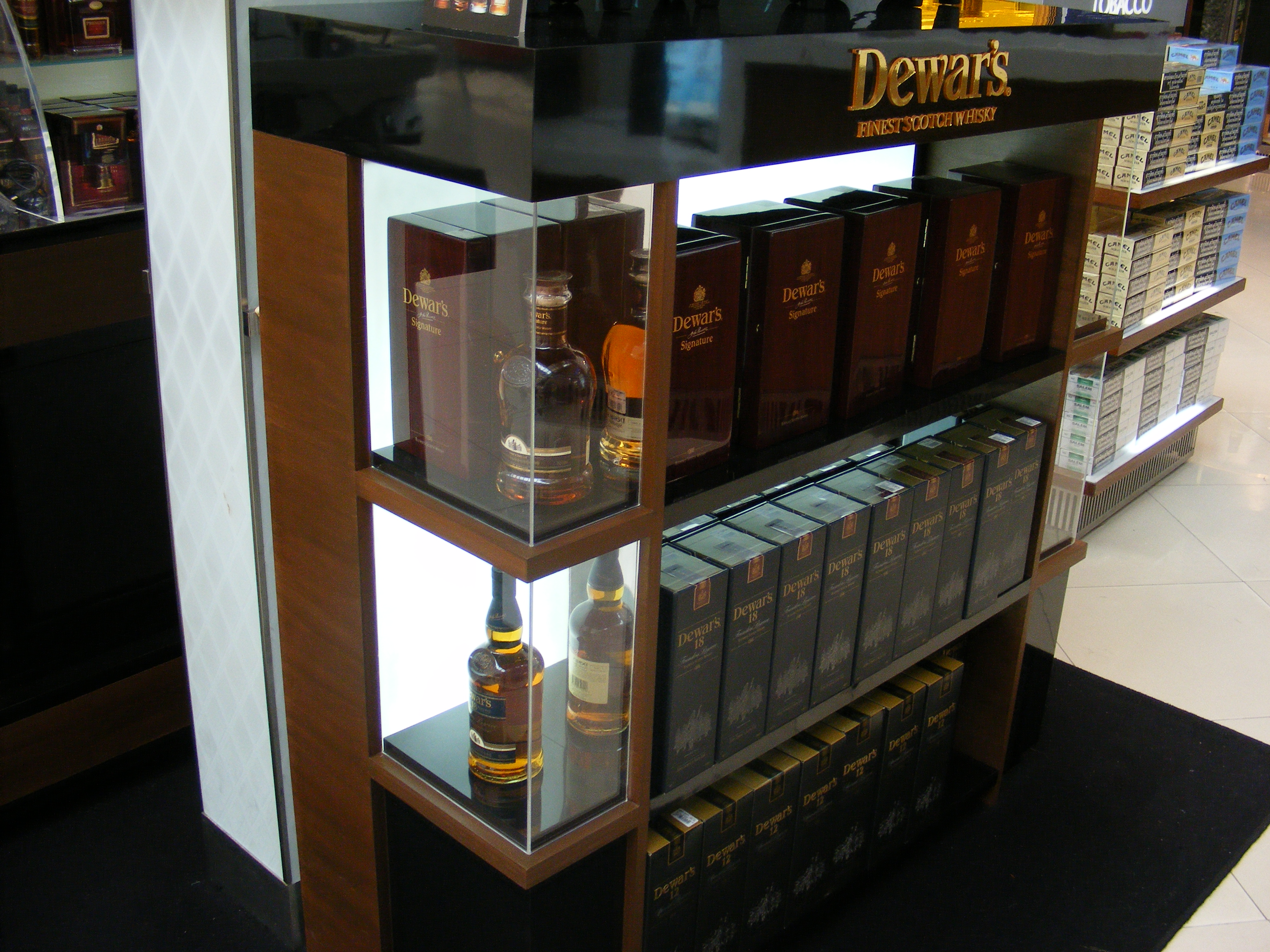
Dewar's Scotch Whisky bottles

- Dewar's Scratched Cask – Released in 2015, Dewar's Scratched Cask used the process of charring and scratching ex-bourbon barrels to release a smoother, American-inspired richness to Dewar's White Label Blended Scotch Whisky. Retired circa 2020.
- Dewar's Caribbean Smooth Rum Cask Finish 8 Year - Released in 2019.
- Dewar's Illegal Smooth Mezcal Cask Finish 8 Year - Released in 2020.
- Dewar's Portuguese Smooth Port Cask Finish 8 Year - Released in 2021.
- Dewar's Japanese Smooth Mizunara Oak Cask Finish 8 Year - Released in 2021.
- Dewar's French Smooth Apple Spirit (Calvados) Cask Finish 8 Year - Released in 2021.

== Advertising ==
- The premier rugby union competition in Victoria, Australia, the Dewar Shield, is named after the company. The Shield, which is the oldest continuous rugby competition in Australia, was donated by the company to the Victorian Rugby Union upon its inauguration in 1909.
- Dewar's has run television advertisements featuring German-Irish actor Michael Fassbender.
- Dewar's created the first motion picture advertisement, "It's Scotch!", in 1898.
- Dewar's was the first Scotch whisky company to use virtual reality video for a product launch for Dewar's Scratched Cask. The VR video, titled "Dewar's Scratched 360", features brand ambassador Gabriel Cardarella touring the various locations in Scotland that are crucial to the process of creating Dewar's Scratched Cask.
