= Henry Dewar, 3rd Baron Forteviot =

Scottish businessman

The Right Honourable The Lord Forteviot
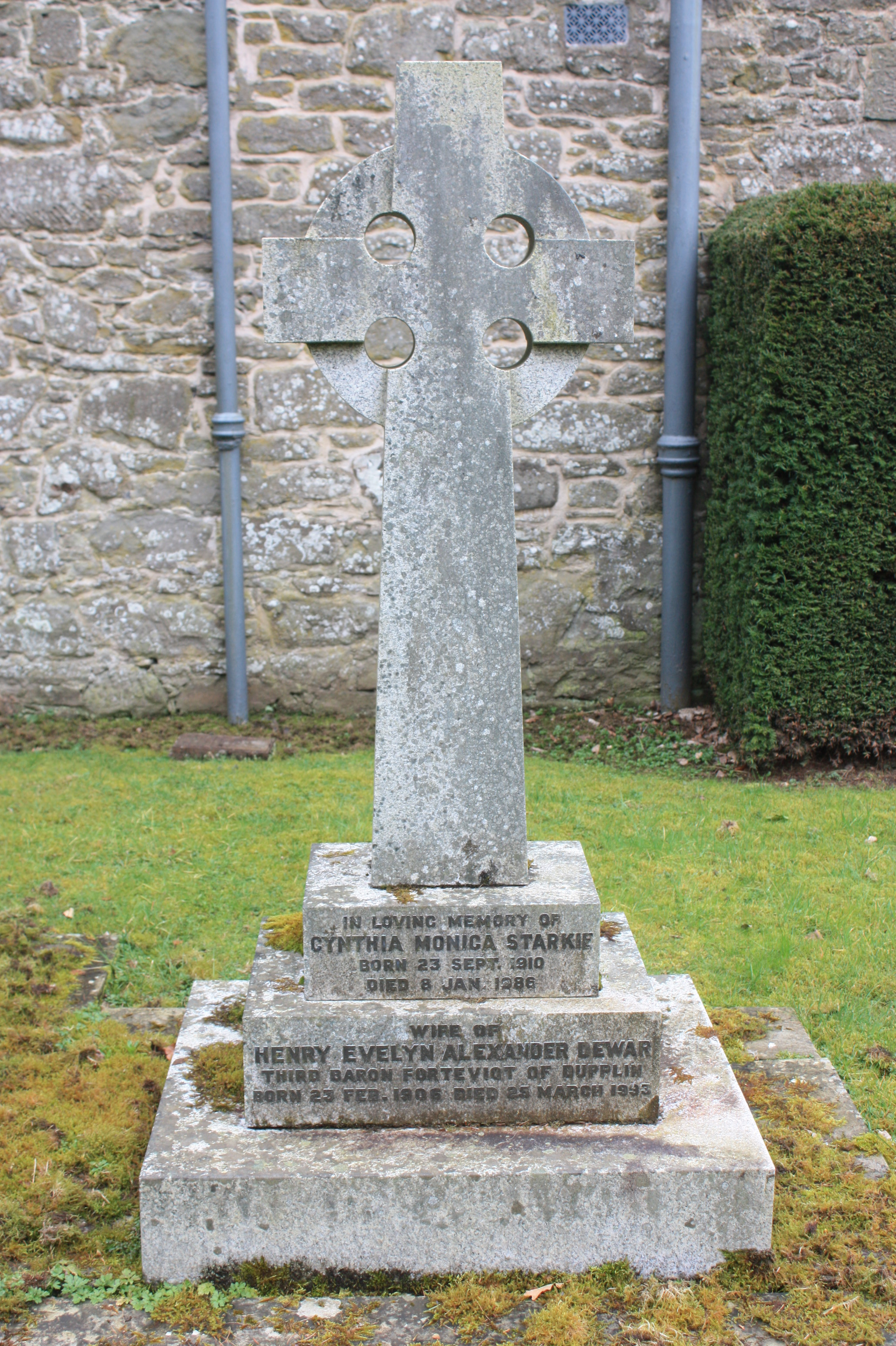
- The grave of Henry Dewar, 3rd Baron Forteviot, Aberdalgie
- Born: 23 February 1906
- Died: 25 March 1993 (aged 87)
- Education: St. John's College
- Occupation: Businessman
- Spouse: Cynthia Starkie (m. 1933; died 1986)
- Children: 4, including Caroline
- Father: John Dewar
- Relatives: David Carnegie (grandson); John Dewar (half-brother); Thomas Dewar (uncle); Arthur Dewar (uncle); James Carnegie (son-in-law); Norman Butler (son-in-law); Richard Worsley (son-in-law)

Henry Evelyn Alexander Dewar, 3rd Baron Forteviot, MBE (23 February 1906 – 25 March 1993), was a Scottish businessman. He was the son of John Dewar, 1st Baron Forteviot and Margaret Elizabeth Holland and succeeded in 1947 as Baron Forteviot from his half-brother John who died childless.

He was invested as a Member of the Order of the British Empire (M.B.E.) in 1943.

== Education and career ==
He was educated at Eton College, Eton, England. In 1929 he graduated from St. John's College, University of Oxford, England, with a Bachelor of Arts (B.A.). He was chairman of John Dewar & Sons between 1954 and 1976.

== Marriage and family ==
He married Cynthia Monica Starkie (d.1986), daughter of Piers Cecil Le Gendre Starkie and Cicely de Hoghton, on 25 April 1933.

They had four children:

- Caroline Cecily Dewar (12 February 1934) she married James Carnegie, 3rd Duke of Fife on 11 September 1956 and they were divorced in December 1966. They have three children and four grandchildren. She remarried General Sir Richard Worsley on 7 November 1980.
- The Honorable Penelope Dewar (29 April 1936) she married Norman Butler on 14 December 1959 and were divorced in 1977. They have three children:
  - Paul Butler (13 June 1960 – 1988)
  - Tracey Penelope Butler (6 November 1961)
  - Sean Butler (25 September 1963)
- John Dewar, 4th Baron Forteviot (5 April 1938) he married Lady Elisabeth Waldegrave (daughter of Geoffrey Noel Waldegrave, 12th Earl Waldegrave) on 17 October 1963. They have four children and six grandchildren:
  - Hon. Mary Emma Jeronima Dewar (1 June 1965) she married Adam Humphrey Drummond of Megginch, 17th Baron Strange in 1988. They have two children:
    - Hon. Sophia Frances Drummond (19 March 1991)
    - Hon. John Adam Humphrey Drummond (3 November 1992)
  - Hon. Miranda Phoebe Dewar (1 March 1968) she married Philippe el Khazen on 15 February 2003. They have two children:
    - Zelfa Elisabeth el Khazen (16 December 2003)
    - Namir Clovis el Khazen (29 July 2005)
  - Hon. Henrietta Cynthia Dewar (27 January 1970) she married Justin Wateridge on 21 July 2001. They have three children:
    - Isabel Elisabeth Wateridge (2 August 2003)
    - Anna Laura Wateridge (25 August 2005)
    - Benedict James Alan Wateridge (24 July 2008)
  - Hon. Alexander John Edward Dewar (4 March 1971) he married Donryn Clement on 5 April 1997. They have one son:
    - James Alexander Thomas Dewar (5 July 2000)
- The Honorable Simon Dewar (11 February 1941) he married Helen Bassett on 3 August 197 and they were divorced in 1973. He remarried Jennifer Hedge on 4 September 1979. They have three daughters:
  - Fiona Mary Dewar (20 November 1980)
  - Alexandra Jean Dewar (18 October 1982)
  - Mary Caroline Dewar (28 September 1984)

His daughter Caroline married in 1956 James Carnegie, 3rd Duke of Fife, only son of Princess Maud, Countess of Southesk and great-grandson of King Edward VII.

His daughter Penelope married in 1959 Norman Butler, son of the founder of Butler Aviation and the village of Oak Brook, Illinois Paul Butler, and grandson of industrialist Frank Osgood Butler. They had three children together, Paul (1960 - 1988), Tracey Penelope (Tiggy) (born 1961) and Sean Butler (born 1963).

He is buried with his wife in the family plot at Aberdalgie just west of Perth.

Peerage of the United Kingdom
Preceded by John Dewar	Baron Forteviot; 1947–1993	Succeeded by John James Evelyn Dewar
