= John Gillis =

John Gillis or Gillies may refer to:

- John Gillies (minister) (1712–1796), Church of Scotland minister and theological writer
- John Gillies (historian) (1747–1836), Scottish historian
- John Gillies (botanist) (1792–1834), Scottish naval surgeon, explorer and botanist
- John P. Gillis (1803–1873), U.S. Navy officer
- John Gillies (New Zealand politician) (1802–1871), New Zealand local politician (Otago Provincial Council) and church elder
- John Lillie Gillies (1832–1897), New Zealand politician
- John Gillies (Canadian politician) (1837–1889), Ontario farmer and political figure
- John Gillies (Australian politician) (1844–1911), Scottish-born Australian politician
- John F. Gillis (1846–1899), physician and political figure in Prince Edward Island
- John Joseph Alban Gillis (1882–1965), physician and politician in British Columbia, Canada
- John Hugh Gillis (1884–1913), Canadian track and field athlete
- John Gillies (footballer) (1918–1991), Scottish footballer
- John Gillies (doctor) (fl. 1970s–2010s), Scottish general practitioner
- John Gillis (historian) (born 1939), professor of history at Rutgers University
- John Gillies (artist and musician) (born 1960), Australian artist and musician
- Jack White or John Gillis (born 1975), musician
- Jon Gillies (born 1994), ice hockey player
