= SSPC =

SSPC may refer to:

- Samar State Polytechnic College, predecessor of the Samar State University in the Philippines
- Scottish School of Primary Care, an academic institution
- Slope Stability Probability Classification, a classification system for slope engineering
- Society for Protective Coatings (previously Steel Structures Painting Council), an association for the industrial coatings industry
- Solid State Pharmaceutical Cluster, an Irish research collaboration
- Solid State Power Converter, a part of the IMAGE spacecracft which may have caused failure
- Southern Sudan Peace Commission, a government organization in South Sudan
- Statewide Suicide Prevention Council, an advisory body in Alaska
- Secretariat of Security and Citizen Protection, an agency in Mexico supervising public safety and security
- State Security and Peace Commission, a Myanmar government body
- Sporting Shooters Pistol Club, in Springvale, Victoria
