= Miles Mack =

Scottish medical doctor

Miles Mack OBE FRCGP
- Born: Essex, England
- Education: University of Edinburgh
- Years active: 1989–present
- Known for: Chair of RCGP Scotland 2014–2017
- Medical career
- Profession: doctor
- Field: General Practitioner
- Website: milesmack.wordpress.com

Miles Bradley Mack OBE FRCGP is a medical doctor who was chair of the Scottish Academy 2019–2022 and was chair of the Scottish council of the Royal College of General Practitioners (RCGP) 2014–2017. He works as a general practitioner in Dingwall in the north of Scotland.

== Early life ==
Mack was born in Essex and lived there for 15 years, before his parents moved to the Highlands. He studied medicine at the University of Edinburgh, qualifying in 1989.

== Career ==
Mack has been a partner at Dingwall Medical Group since 1993.

He helped mark the centenary of the 1912 Dewar Report having helping undertake research into the contents of the work. He described Scottish Government’s plans to designate new controls on pharmacy applications as a significant step forward in health service planning for remote and rural and isolated areas. Mack has also highlighted the importance of support for people who experience difficulties related to mental health.

=== RCGP Scotland chair ===
In November 2014, Mack became the chair of the Scottish council of RCGP, succeeding Dr John Gillies. He was vice chair of the Academy of Medical Royal Colleges and Faculties in Scotland.

During his first year as RCGP Scotland chairman, Mack highlighted many issues that would need to be tackled in Scotland. He also spoke about how he saw general practice as a part of healthcare worth investing in, Following this the Scottish Government announced some further measures of support for general practice.

In November 2017, he was succeeded as the chair of the Scottish council of RCGP by Dr Carey Lunan. He became a member of the RCGP's trustee board that year, for a three-year period.

=== Scottish Academy chair ===
In December 2019, he became chair of the Academy of Medical Royal Colleges and Faculties in Scotland (Scottish Academy), the first GP to hold this post.

== Honours and awards ==
Mack became a Fellow of the RCGP in 2009. He was the recipient of the RCGP's Alastair Donald Award in 2012.

In 2022 he was awarded the RCGP's President's Medal. He was appointed Officer of the Order of the British Empire (OBE) in the 2023 Birthday Honours for services to general practice.
