= Frank Sullivan =

Frank Sullivan may refer to:

- Frank Sullivan (baseball) (1930–2016), American baseball pitcher
- Frank Sullivan (basketball), college men's basketball coach
- Frank Sullivan (film editor) (1896–1972), American film editor
- Frank J. Sullivan (1852–?), state senator in California's 13th senatorial district
- Frank Sullivan (ice hockey, born 1898) (1898–1989), Canadian ice hockey player for the University of Toronto Grads and Canada
- Frank Sullivan (ice hockey, born 1929) (1929–2009), Canadian ice hockey player for the Toronto Maple Leafs and Chicago Blackhawks
- Frank Sullivan (medical doctor), Scottish general practitioner and medical researcher
- Frank Sullivan (writer) (1892–1976), American journalist and humorist
- Frank Sullivan Jr. (born 1950), justice of the Indiana Supreme Court
- Frank Sullivan (American football), American football player

== See also ==
- Francis Sullivan (disambiguation)
