= Christian Gray =

Christian Gray may refer to:

- Christian Gray (poet) (1772–1830), Scottish poet
- Christian Gray (footballer) (born 1996), New Zealand footballer
- Christian Gray (American football) (born 2005), American football cornerback

== See also ==
- Christian Grey, fictional character from Fifty Shades
