= Norman Butler (polo) =

Polo player and horse breeder (1918–2011)

- Norman Butler at Guards Polo Club, 1958
- Born: December 2, 1918
- Died: October 8, 2011 (aged 92)
- Education: Downside School; Stonyhurst College; Oriel College, Oxford
- Occupations: Polo player, industrialist, racehorse owner/breeder, sportsman
- Spouses: Pauline Winn (m. 1948; div. 1958) Penelope Dewar (m. 1959; div. 1977) Gabriella Gröger (m. 1981)
- Children: 6
- Father: Paul Butler
- Relatives: Frank Osgood Butler (grandfather)
- Military career
- Allegiance: United States
- Branch: Navy
- Service years: 1942-1945
- Rank: Lieutenant
- Conflicts: World War II
- Awards: Air Medal, Bronze Star Medal and Presidential Unit Citation

Norman Butler (December 2, 1918 – October 8, 2011) was an American sportsman and international polo player raised and educated in England and Europe, and who lived most of his life in Europe. He was also a thoroughbred race horse owner and breeder whose horses raced all over Europe, and where he won several classic races.

== Early life, education and career ==
Norman Butler was born on December 2, 1918. Butler was the eldest son from the first marriage of wealthy industrialist Paul Butler. He was raised in England, France and Italy, and attended Hodder Place, Downside School and Stonyhurst College in Lancashire, England. He studied Modern Greats at Oriel College, Oxford University. He excelled as a sportsman at boarding school and Oxford, in particular at rugby, athletics and swimming.

During WW2 he served as a U.S. Navy Lieutenant bomber pilot (USNR) with Squadron VB-107, which was based in Natal, Brazil and Ascension Island. He was decorated three times, with the Air Medal, Bronze Star Medal and Presidential Unit Citation.

From 1948 until 1960 he worked in England for the Butler family companies, which included Butler Paper and Butler Aviation, and founded Butler S.A. (South America).

== Polo and horse racing ==
Butler played polo internationally in England, Argentina and the United States. He frequently played alongside Prince Philip at Cowdray Park and Guards Polo Club.

In 1962 he bought Kilboy House in County Tipperary, Ireland from the Dunalley family for £20,500 as a winter home and base for his thoroughbred stables. He also owned Athgarvan Lodge, in County Kildare, which had been used by George IV, and which he bought for a then record £490,000 for a stud farm in Ireland. As a thoroughbred breeder in 1972 he won the classic Irish 1,000 Guineas and the Irish St. Leger as well as the Pretty Polly Stakes with his horse Pidget, trained by Kevin Prendergast and ridden by the jockeys T. P. Burns, Bill Williamson and Wally Swinburn. His racing colours were light blue with dark blue spots on the cap.

Other notable horses included Pabui (winner of the 1974 Criterium di Roma at Capanelle), Mabui and Kilboy. He purchased several horses from the Aga Khan IV, including Emali. His horses raced with wins in Ireland, England, Italy and France.

== Personal life ==
In 1948 he married Pauline Katharine Winn (1920-1984) at Caxton Hall, Westminster, daughter of Olive, Lady Baillie and the Hon. Charles John Frederick Winn (son of Rowland Winn, 2nd Baron St Oswald), of Leeds Castle in Kent. They divorced in 1958. They had two children together, Sandra (born 1949) and Paget (born 1953).

In 1959 he married in Perth, Scotland his second wife, the Hon. Penelope Dewar (1935-2023), daughter of Lord Forteviot, owner of Dewar Whiskies in Scotland. The wedding reception was held at Dupplin Castle. They divorced in 1977. They had three children together, Paul (1960-1988), Tiggy (born 1961) and Sean (born 1963).

In 1981 he married at Kensington and Chelsea Register Office his third wife Baroness Gabriella Gröger (1945-2012), who was fashion editor of German Vogue, daughter of a German WW1 fighter pilot, banker and Director of the Dresdner Bank. They had one son together, Patrick (born 1986).

He was a member of Buck's Club.

Butler died on October 8, 2011, at the age of 92.
