= John Dewar, 2nd Baron Forteviot =

British businessman and soldier

The Right Honourable The Lord Forteviot OBE MC TD FRSE DL JP
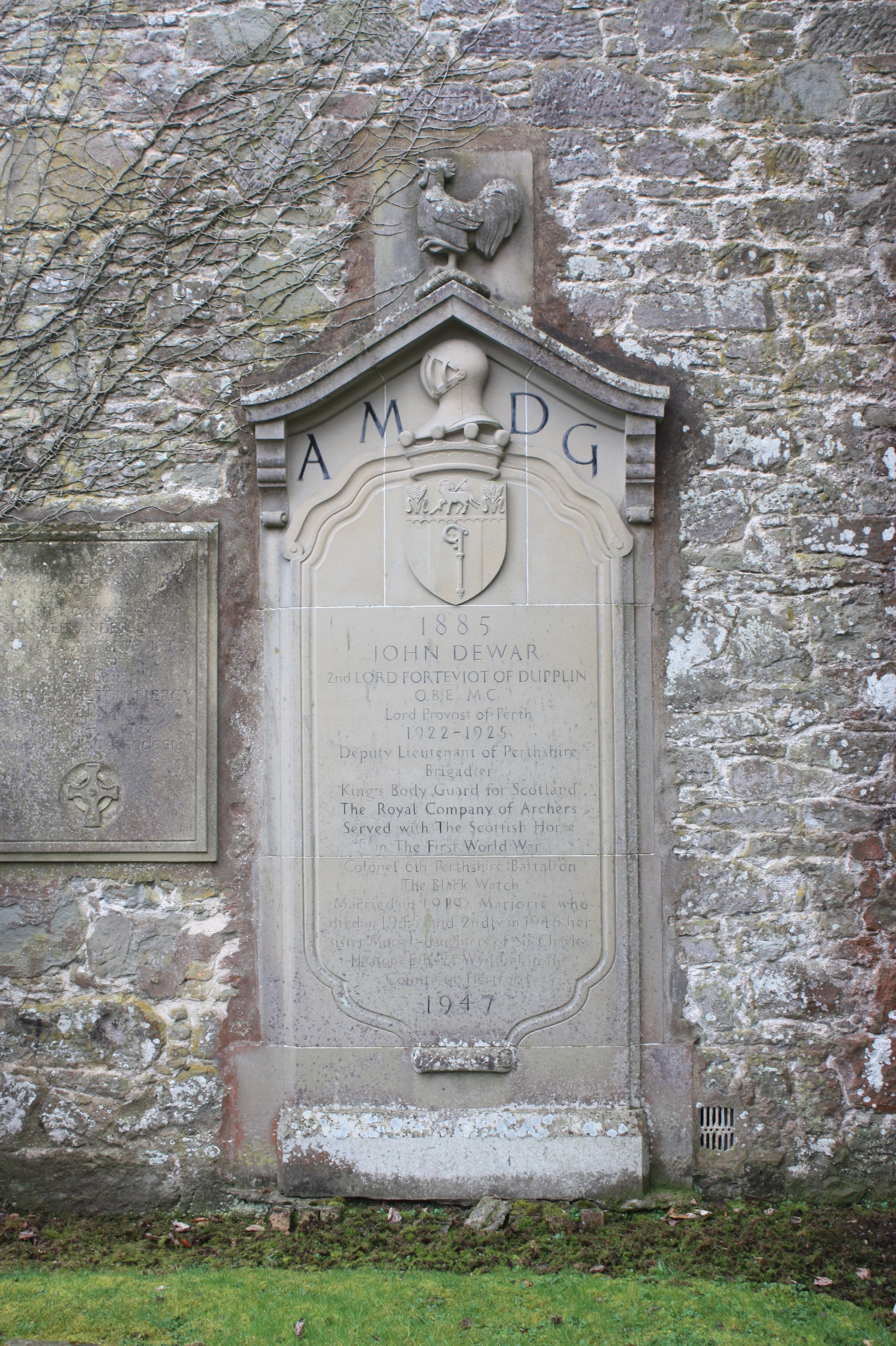
- The grave of John Dewar, 2nd Baron Forteviot, Aberdalgie
- Born: 17 March 1885; Perth, Scotland
- Died: 24 October 1947 (aged 62); Dupplin Moor, Perth, Scotland
- Education: Oxford University (no degree)
- Occupation: Businessman
- Spouses: Marjory Heaton-Ellis (m. 1919; died 1945) Muriel Cavendish (m. 1946)
- Children: 1
- Father: John Dewar
- Relatives: Henry Dewar (half-brother); Thomas Dewar (uncle); Arthur Dewar (uncle)
- Military career
- Allegiance: United Kingdom
- Unit: Scottish Horse Regiment
- Conflicts: World War I
- Awards: Military Cross

John Dewar, 2nd Baron Forteviot OBE MC TD FRSE DL JP (17 March 1885 – 24 October 1947) was a Scottish businessman and soldier, notable as being head of the whisky giant John Dewar & Sons and of the Distillers Company and a director of the Bank of Scotland.

== Life ==
He was born on 17 March 1885 the eldest child and only son of Sir John Dewar, 1st Baron Forteviot and his wife Johann (Joan) Tod. His uncle (his father's brother) was Thomas Dewar, 1st Baron Dewar. He was sent to Rugby School in England as a boarder, followed by New College at Oxford University (but did not graduate).

In the First World War he served as a colonel in the Scottish Horse Regiment, serving in the Balkans, Gallipoli and Egypt. He won the Military Cross for bravery.

From 1922 to 1924 he served as Lord Provost of Perth and was also Deputy Lieutenant of Perthshire. He was appointed an Officer of the Order of the British Empire (OBE) in the 1925 Birthday Honours. On the death of his father in 1929 he succeeded to the title of Baron Forteviot. He also held the title of brigadier in the Royal Company of Archers, the monarch's official bodyguard in Scotland.

In 1943, he was elected a Fellow of the Royal Society of Edinburgh. His proposers were James Watt, Sidney Lord Elphinstone, James Pickering Kendall, and John Edwin MacKenzie.

He died at his country estate of Dupplin on 24 October 1947. He is buried at Aberdalgie slightly south-west of Perth. The grave lies attached to the church within the family enclosure to the rear of the church.

== Family ==
He married twice, firstly in 1919 to Marjory Winton Isobel Heaton-Ellis (d.1945), secondly in 1946 to Marjory's sister, Mrs Muriel Cecil Harriette Cavendish (then a widow). They had no children, however John, during his marriage to Marjory had an illegitimate daughter in 1924. When John died, the barony passed to his younger half brother, Henry Dewar.

Peerage of the United Kingdom
| Preceded by John Dewar | Baron Forteviot; 1929–1947 | Succeeded by Henry Dewar |
