= Aberdalgie =

Coordinates: 56°21′51″N 3°29′33″W

Aberdalgie: Scottish Gaelic: Obar Dheilgidh
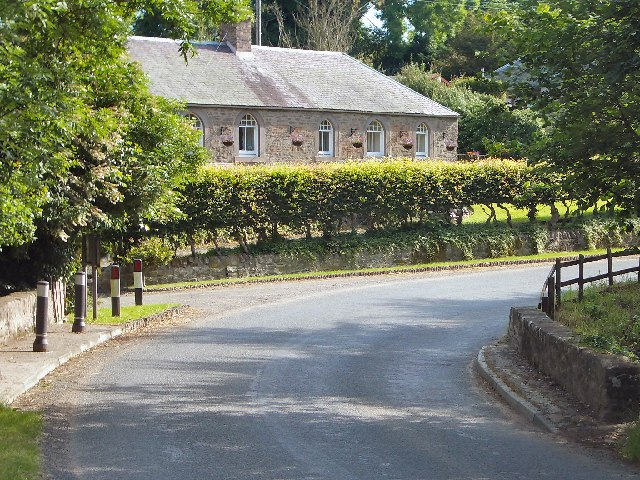
- Aberdalgie

- Location within Perth and Kinross
- Population: 402
- OS grid reference: NO079201
- Council area: Perth and Kinross
- Lieutenancy area: Perth and Kinross
- Country: Scotland
- Sovereign state: United Kingdom
- Post town: PERTH
- Postcode district: PH2
- Dialling code: 01738
- Police: Scotland
- Fire: Scottish
- Ambulance: Scottish

Aberdalgie (Gaelic: Obar Dheilgidh, 'Confluence of the Thorn-Stream') is a small village in the Scottish council area of Perth and Kinross. It is 3 miles (5 kilometres) southwest of Perth, and lies between the B9112 road, to the north, and the River Earn, to the south. Milltown Burn and Cotton Burn streams meet in the village centre, The village contains Aberdalgie Parish Church, the present building of which dates to 1773. The historic Dupplin Castle is 1 1/2 miles (2.5 kilometres) east of the village.

The parish of Aberdalgie takes its name from the village, which had a population of 402 at the 2011 Census.

== Notable landmarks ==
=== Parish church ===
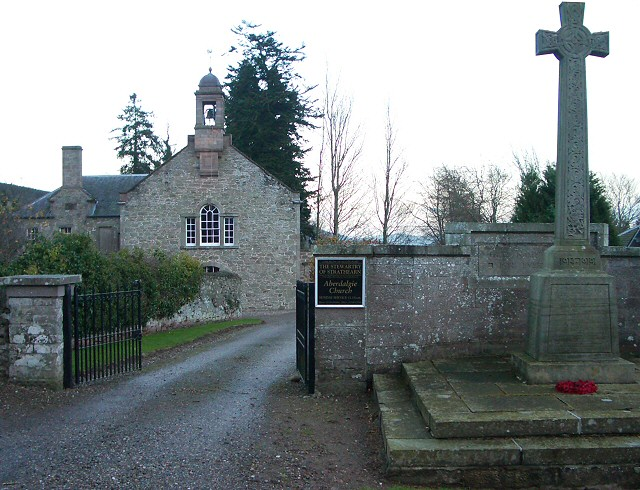
Aberdalgie Parish Church and War Memorial

The current Parish Church of Aberdalgie is dated 1773, but an earlier building is believed to have originally dated to the pre-Reformation period. In 1618 it became the parish church of both Aberdalgie and Dupplin, when the parishes united. It was designated a Category B-listed building in 1971.

The T-plan church features two large centre round-arched windows and doors with circular windows on either side. In 1929 the church interior was given a major renovation by Sir R.S. Lorimer. Aberdalgie churchyard contains the family vault where numerous medieval Chiefs of Clan Oliphant including the first three Lords Oliphant are buried. Prominent among them is Sir William Oliphant, the resolute Governor of Stirling Castle when it was defended against Edward I of England in 1304, during the Wars of Scottish Independence. Sir William's son Walter married Elizabeth, daughter of Robert I and sister of David II. Other people buried here include the 1st, 2nd and 3rd Baron Forteviot and author Norma Octavia Lorimer (1863-1948).

=== Dupplin Castle ===
Dupplin Castle lies within the parish. The earliest known owner of the castle was Sir William Oliphant in the late 13th century. Dupplin was sold after some four hundred years by the 5th Lord Oliphant (who, per the diploma registered under the Great Seal, 10 March 1640, was also Lord Aberdalgie and Lord Dupplin) in 1623. The castle was destroyed in 1461 and rebuilt. It was again rebuilt in 1688, though retained its earlier tower and some remnants from the previous castle. A fire gutted the castle in 1827, prompting a full rebuilding and restoration. The current building is a house, completed in 1970.

Timber from Aberdalgie was harvested by Regent Arran and employed in 1547 during the war of the Rough Wooing for the stocks of guns and cannon used at the battle of Pinkie.

== Notable people ==
- Christian Gray (1772 – circa 1830), poet
