= Pidget =

British-bred Thoroughbred racehorse

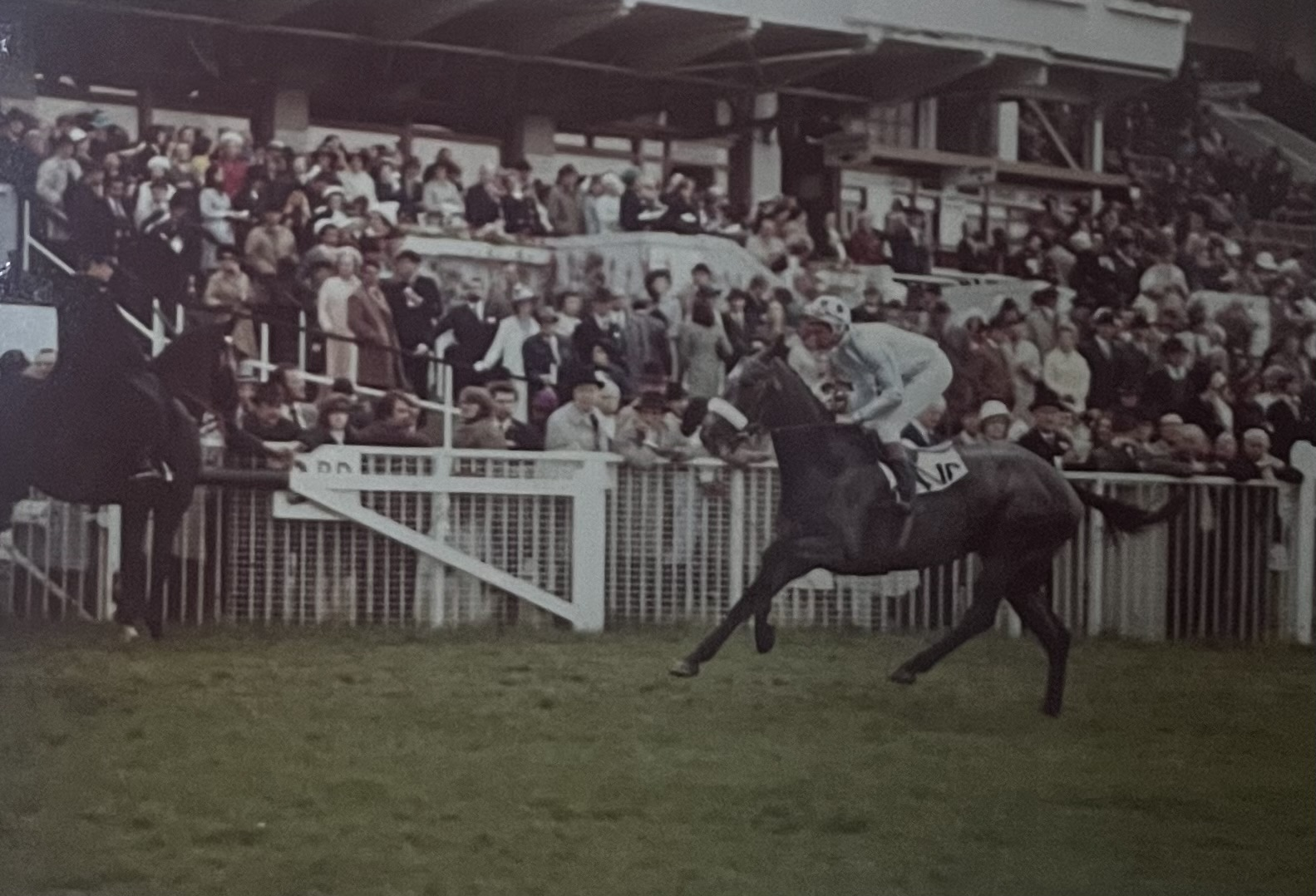
- Pidget racing in 1972
- Sire: Fortino
- Grandsire: Grey Sovereign
- Dam: Primlace
- Damsire: Chamossaire
- Sex: Stallion
- Foaled: 1969
- Country: United Kingdom
- Colour: Grey
- Breeder: Norman Butler
- Owner: Norman Butler
- Trainer: Kevin Prendergast
- Record: 17: 6-3-2

Major wins
- Irish 1000 Guineas (1972); Pretty Polly Stakes (1972); Irish St Leger (1972)

Awards
- Timeform rating 120 (1972), 109 (1973)

Pidget (1969 – after 1984) was a British-bred, Irish-trained Thoroughbred racehorse and broodmare. In 1972 she completed a unique double when she won both the Irish 1000 Guineas and the Irish St Leger. After showing some promise when winning a minor race as a juvenile in 1971, she won two of her first three races the following spring before recording an upset win in the Irish 1000 Guineas. In the summer of 1972 she won the Pretty Polly Stakes and was placed in both the Irish Oaks and the Desmond Stakes. On her final run of the year she took her second Irish Classic when she defeated male opponents in the Irish St Leger. She failed to win in the following year and was retired from racing. As a broodmare she produced two minor winners including the Group-placed Fenney Mill.

== Background ==
Pidget was a "tall" grey mare bred in the United Kingdom by her owner Norman Butler. During her racing career she was trained in Ireland by Kevin Prendergast.

She inherited her grey coat from her sire Fortino, a French sprinter whose wins included the Prix de l'Abbaye as a three-year-old in 1962. As a breeding stallion, Fortino was best known as the sire of Caro. Her dam Primlace was a minor winner over middle distances and produced several other winners. She was a granddaughter of the Prix Morny winner Necklace who was in turn a daughter of The Oaks winner Straitlace.

== Racing career ==
=== 1971: two-year-old season ===
After finishing third on her racecourse debut, Pidget recorded her first success in a maiden race over seven furlongs. On her final appearance of the year she was brought back in distance and finished sixth in a race over five furlongs.

=== 1972: three-year-old season ===
Pidget began her second season by winning the Spring Stakes over seven furlongs at Baldoyle Racecourse, beating French Oyster by three quarters of a length. She was then moved up in class to contest the Group 3 Athasi Stakes over the same distance at the Curragh in April and was beaten two lengths into second place by the Vincent O'Brien-trained favourite Arkadina. She then returned to winning form at Phoenix Park Racecourse where she won the Bedford Guineas Trial by a neck from Moppett's Pride. On 13 May she was stepped up to the highest class for the Group 1 Irish 1000 Guineas over one mile soft ground at the Curragh. The betting saw Arkadina made the 7/4 favourite ahead of Princess Bonita (fourth in the English 1000 Guineas) and Klairlone (winner of the Mulcahy Stakes) whilst Pidget started a 20/1 outsider in a sixteen-runner field. Ridden by Wally Swinburn she tracked the leaders before overtaking Arkadina to gain the advantage three furlongs out and although the favourite rallied strongly, Pidget stayed on well to win by half a length.

Pidget was moved up in distance when she was sent to England to contest the Oaks Stakes over one and a half miles at Epsom Racecourse on 10 June but made little impression on the race and finished eighth behind Ginevra. In July she was dropped back to ten furlongs for the Pretty Polly Stakes at the Curragh and won by three quarters of a length from Royal Reproach from and a field which also included Arkadina and the Coronation Stakes winner Calve. She was back on the track later that month for the Irish Oaks and finished third to Regal Exception and Arkadina. In the Desmond Stakes over ten furlongs in August she was matched against male opposition and again ran well in defeat as she came home second behind the colt Boucher, who went on to win the St Leger Stakes.

On 2 September Pidget was sent to France for a strongly-contested edition of the Prix de la Nonette over 2100 metres at Longchamp Racecourse and finished unplaced behind Rescousse. Three weeks later at the Curragh the filly was ridden by T. P. Burns when she attempted to win her second Irish Classic in the Irish St Leger over one and three quarter miles. The favourite for the race was Our Mirage, a British-trained colt who had won the Great Voltigeur Stakes and finished second to Boucher in the St Leger. The best-fancied of the other five runners was Manitoulin a colt from the Vincent O'Brien whose wins included the Royal Whip Stakes and the Blandford Stakes. The closing stages of the race developed into a sustained struggle between Pidget, who was in front on the final turn, and Our Mirage, who emerged as her only serious challenger. Pidget maintained a strong gallop to the end and won by two lengths with a gap of four lengths back to Fire Red in third place. The racecourse stewards held an inquiry into possible interference caused by Pidget in the straight but left the result unchanged.

At the end of the season, the independent Timeform organisation gave Pidget a rating of 120, making her 13 pounds inferior to their best three-year-filly San San.

=== 1973: four-year-old season ===
Pidget showed some sign of having retained her ability on her first run of 1973, finishing second to the three-year-old colt Cavo Doro in the Ballymoss Stakes in April: the winner went on to finish second in The Derby. She ran sixth in her next race and then finished last of the five runners behind Roberto in the Coronation Cup at Epsom in June. A step up in distance for the Ascot Gold Cup later that month brought no improvement and she finished last again.

== Breeding record ==
At the end of her racing career, Pidget became a broodmare. She produced at least seven foals and two winners between 1977 and 1984:

- Frazer, a grey colt, foaled in 1975. Unraced.
- Palagonian, a bay colt, foaled in 1976, sired by Habitat. Winner in Ireland.
- Fenney Mill, bay filly, 1977, by Levmoss. Pidget's third foal. Won one race in Ireland, third in Ribblesdale Stakes.
- Bustereen, bay filly, 1979, by Busted. Unraced.
- Spectacular Guest, grey colt, 1982, by Be My Guest. Unraced.
- Par Excellence, bay colt, 1983, by Be My Guest.
- Princess Pidget, chestnut filly, 1984, by Kings Lake.

== Pedigree ==
Pedigree of Pidget (GB), grey mare, 1969
Sire Fortino (FR) 1959	Grey Sovereign (GB); 1948	Nasrullah	Nearco
Sire Fortino (FR) 1959	Grey Sovereign (GB); 1948	Nasrullah	Mumtaz Begum
Sire Fortino (FR) 1959	Grey Sovereign (GB); 1948	Kong	Baytown
Sire Fortino (FR) 1959	Grey Sovereign (GB); 1948	Kong	Clang
Sire Fortino (FR) 1959	Ranavalo (FR); 1954	Relic	War Relic
Sire Fortino (FR) 1959	Ranavalo (FR); 1954	Relic	Bridal Colors
Sire Fortino (FR) 1959	Ranavalo (FR); 1954	Navarra	Orsenigo
Sire Fortino (FR) 1959	Ranavalo (FR); 1954	Navarra	Nervesa
Dam Primlace (GB) 1960	Chamossaire (GB); 1942	Precipitation	Hurry On
Dam Primlace (GB) 1960	Chamossaire (GB); 1942	Precipitation	Double Life
Dam Primlace (GB) 1960	Chamossaire (GB); 1942	Snowberry	Cameronian
Dam Primlace (GB) 1960	Chamossaire (GB); 1942	Snowberry	Myrobella
Dam Primlace (GB) 1960	Prim Diana (GB); 1944	Foxhunter	Foxlaw
Dam Primlace (GB) 1960	Prim Diana (GB); 1944	Foxhunter	Trimestral
Dam Primlace (GB) 1960	Prim Diana (GB); 1944	Necklace	Lemberg
Dam Primlace (GB) 1960	Prim Diana (GB); 1944	Necklace	Straitlace (Family 3-d)
