= Scotter baronets =

Extinct baronetcy in the Baronetage of the United Kingdom

Escutcheon of the Scotter baronets of Surbiton

The Scotter baronetcy, of Surbiton in the County of Surrey, was a title in the Baronetage of the United Kingdom. It was created on 16 July 1907 for the railway manager and Engineer and Railway Staff Corps volunteer officer Sir Charles Scotter. The title became extinct on the death of the 2nd Baronet in 1911.

== Scotter baronets, of Surbiton (1907) ==
- Sir Charles Scotter, 1st Baronet (1835–1910)
- Sir Frederick Charles Scotter, 2nd Baronet (1868–1911), died leaving no heir.

== Notes ==
Baronetage of the United Kingdom
Preceded by Dewar baronets	Scotter baronets of Surbiton; 16 July 1907	Succeeded by Treolar baronets
