= A Ramble Round the Globe =

1894 book by Thomas Dewar

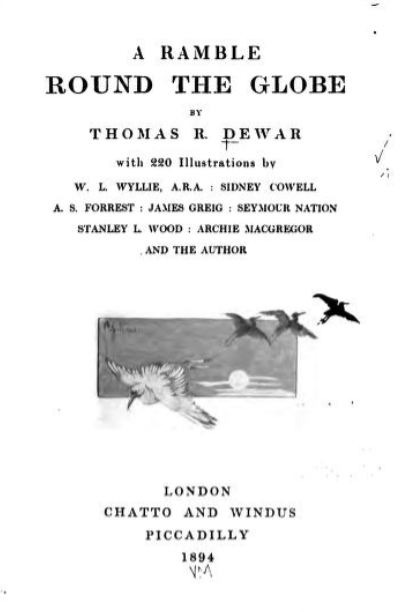
- Title page for A Ramble Round the Globe (1894)
- Author: Thomas Dewar
- Language: English
- Genre: Non-fiction
- Publisher: Chatto and Windus
- Publication date: 1894
- Publication place: Scotland
- Media type: Print
- Pages: 316 pp

A Ramble Round the Globe is an 1894 book by Thomas Dewar detailing his journey around the world publicizing Dewars Scotch Whisky. The book is at least purportedly Dewar's journal, written solely for his friends who "wanted to know 'all about it.'"

== Dewar's travels ==
Dewar's trip was motivated not only by a desire to market his brand, but also by medical imperatives: Dewar had been battling a persistent cold that had been growing worse, and his doctor suggested that a warmer climate could rid him of this threatening cold.

The journey departed from Speyside in Scotland and embarked for Boston in the US, then onto New York, Washington, Chicago and San Francisco. He then sailed to Hawaii, Fiji, New Zealand, Australia, China and Hong Kong. The writings both praise and chastise his surroundings as he traverses through the very differing cities around the world.

The journey was a success. Upon his return, Dewar's was on both sides of the Atlantic and Pacific. Whisky was little known, let alone drunk outside Scotland at the time, and Sir Thomas Dewar played a large role in changing this to bring the Dewar's brand to homes around the world.

== A Ramble Round the Globe: Revisited ==
A Ramble Round the Globe: Revisited
- Author: Malcolm Greenwood
- Language: English
- Genre: Non-fiction
- Publisher: Neil Wilson Publishing
- Publication date: 1999
- Publication place: Scotland
- Media type: Print
- Pages: 92 pp
- ISBN: 1-897784-96-1

The 1894 book was revisited by Malcolm Greenwood, another Scotch Whisky enthusiast, in his 1999 A Ramble Round the Globe: Revisited. Inspired by the original book, Greenwood decided to trace Dewar's footsteps and travel around the globe in order to re-examine the places and cultures Dewar visited over a hundred years earlier.
