= Michael Butler (producer) =

American theatrical producer (1926–2022)

- Michael Butler, American producer
- Born: November 26, 1926; Chicago, Illinois, U.S.
- Died: November 7, 2022 (aged 95); Santa Barbara, California, U.S.
- Occupations: Theatrical producer, businessman, polo player
- Notable work: Hair, Lenny, Reggae
- Spouses: Marti Stevens; Robin Boyer; Loyce Stinson Hand
- Children: 1
- Parent(s): Paul Butler (father); Marjorie Stresenreuter (mother)

Michael Butler (November 26, 1926 – November 7, 2022) was an American theatrical producer, businessman and polo player, best known for bringing the rock musical Hair from the Public Theater to Broadway in 1968. During his time as Hair producer he was dubbed "the hippie millionaire" by the press. His other Broadway production credits include the play Lenny in 1971 and the musical Reggae in 1980.

== Early life ==
Butler was born Paul Butler Jr. in Chicago into a wealthy industrial family. He was the first son from the second marriage of his father Paul Butler to Marjorie Stresenreuter. His family arrived in America in the early 1600's. In the early 19th century, his ancestors started a paper company on the Fox River in St. Charles, Illinois, and supplied paper for the U.S. Congress. The business was later moved to Chicago, where it was at one time one of the city's oldest family-owned businesses, which later diversified into dairy, ranching and aviation. Butler's father Paul Butler helped found the village of Oak Brook, Illinois the Oak Brook Polo Club and Butler Aviation.

Butler attended the Butler School, Avery Coonley School, Chicago Latin School, Culver Military Academy and the University of Virginia.

Butler was the godson of Tyrone Power and, in his early twenties, he lived with Power and his wife, actress Linda Christian. Through Power's friend, film director Edmund Goulding, he befriended the Kennedy family, particularly Joe and John F. Kennedy (JFK). Butler and JFK often socialized in Palm Beach, Hyannisport, Greenwich Village and Newport, Rhode Island, as well as sailing together in the South of France.

== Early career ==
Butler served as Special Advisor to then-Senator John F. Kennedy on the Middle East, as chancellor of the Lincoln Academy, Commissioner of the Port of Chicago, president of the Organization of Economic Development in Illinois, an assistant to Illinois Governor Otto Kerner, Jr., and the president of the Illinois Sports Council. He was a Democratic candidate in Du Page County for the State Senate. He also worked for the Butler family companies, including Butler Paper and Butler Overseas, where he participated in the reconstruction of the Hejaz Railroad which had been destroyed by T. E. Lawrence during WW1, through his family's friendship with King Hussein of Jordan.

== Hair ==
In 1967, Butler was preparing to run for the US Senate when he began to discuss the Vietnam War with a young student who worked as a gardener at his home. As a result of those discussions, Butler developed an anti-war focus. Later that year in New York City, while on business related to Otto Kerner, Jr.'s Commission about Civil Disorders, he attended the show Hair at the Public Theater and, noting its strong anti-war statement, decided to obtain the rights to the show. Hair opened on Broadway in April 1968 and became a huge success, running for 1,750 performances, and leading to many other productions. By the time the Broadway production closed in 1972, Butler had overseen nine national productions and nineteen international productions. Butler also produced the 1979 movie adaptation of Hair, directed by Miloš Forman.

== Later business career ==
In the 1950's Butler developed a ski resort at Sugarbush in Vermont., and was a founder member of Ski Club Ten there. In 1960 Butler developed with two of his closest friends, Ahmet Ertegun and Julio Mario Santo Domingo, an award-winning resort on Fire Island called Talisman. In 1966 Butler became one of the owners of the Chicago Spurs soccer team. With his friend Olivier Coquelin, he became a partner in several New York City discotheques including Ondine, Inferno, Hippopotamus and Le Bison.

== Polo ==
Butler was a third generation polo player. He rose to a 1-goal handicap. As a player Butler won the 1974 Delegate's Cup, the 1979 Continental Cup, and the Butler Handicap in 1979, 1986 and 1989.

In the early 1970's Butler moved to Warfield Hall, Berkshire, where he became captain of the Warfield polo team.

In 1971, Butler and Lord Patrick Beresford relaunched the Coronation Cup, which had been inaugurated in 1911 in honour of the Coronation of George V, and had not been played since 1953 for the Coronation of Elizabeth II. The 1971 Coronation Cup was played at Guards Polo Club, where the USA defeated Great Britain 9-6.

Butler served on the Board of Governors of the United States Polo Association for 17 years, from 1968 to 1985. He also managed the Oak Brook Polo Club for many years, including organising for Prince Charles to play there in 1986 with an all-British team in front of 20,000 spectators.

== Activism ==
Around the time of his first association with Hair, Butler became a political activist. Before the 1968 Democratic National Convention in Chicago, he arranged a meeting between Chicago mayor Richard Daley and Abbie Hoffman, recommending that the party cultivate the Yippie vote. He held "Cause" meetings in Oak Brook, Illinois in the summer of 1969 with Tom Smothers, Peter Yarrow, and Black Panther Fred Hampton, among others. Butler donated hundreds of thousands of dollars to left-leaning causes, and was listed twice on Richard Nixon's Enemies List.

== Personal life ==
Butler dated Candice Bergen, Catherine Deneuve, Naty Abascal and Audrey Hepburn, with whom he had a relationship in the early 1950s before her marriage to Mel Ferrer. Butler was involved in Hepburn accepting a role in the New York production of the play Ondine, where she worked with Ferrer not long before marrying him.

Butler was married three times. His first marriage was to actress Marti Stevens, daughter of film studio executive and head of MGM Nicholas Schenck. It was during this time that he had an affair with Rock Hudson. His second marriage was to Robin Boyer (1939 - 2022), who came from a Philadelphia Main Line family and was a fashion editor at American Vogue. After their divorce she married British banker Rupert Hambro. His third marriage was in 1962, to Loyce Stinson Hand. They had one son Adam Butler, also a polo player, who is married to Michelle Butler. Butler also has a grandson, Liam Butler.

He was a member of the Knickerbocker Club, Racquet and Tennis Club, Art Institute of Chicago and The Explorers Club.

Butler died on November 7, 2022, in Santa Barbara, California, at the age of 95.
