= Francis Sullivan =

Francis Sullivan may refer to:

- Francis Sullivan (ice hockey) (1917–2007), Canadian ice hockey player
- Francis A. Sullivan (1922-2019), American Jesuit priest and theologian
- Francis Conroy Sullivan (1882–1929), Canadian architect
- Francis Henry Sullivan (1916–1942), member of the U.S. Navy; one of the five American Sullivan brothers killed in World War II
- Francis L. Sullivan (1903–1956), English actor
- Francis D. Sullivan, former member of the Ohio Senate
- Francis J. Sullivan (born 1956), CEO of the Catholic Church in Australia's Truth, Justice and Healing Council
- Sir Francis Sullivan, 6th Baronet (1834–1906), Royal Navy admiral
- Francis Stoughton Sullivan (1715–1766), Irish lawyer and professor of oratory
- Francis W. Sullivan (1894–1967), a justice of the Maine Supreme Judicial Court
- Francis William Sullivan (fl. 1910s), author

== See also ==
- Frank Sullivan (disambiguation)
