= Highlands and Islands Medical Service =

The Highlands and Islands Medical Service (HIMS) provided state funded healthcare to a population covering half of Scotland's landmass from its launch in 1913 until the creation of Scotland's National Health Service (NHS) in 1948. Though treatment was not free, unlike NHS Scotland which succeeded it, fees were set at minimal levels and people could still get treated even if they were unable to pay.

== Foundation ==
The service came into being as a direct result of the publication of the Report of the Highlands and Islands Medical Service Committee or "Dewar Report" in 1912. This report exposed inadequate medical and nursing services across large parts of the crofting counties and recommended a new way of delivering state funded medical services. Doctors would be guaranteed a minimum salary and cost of travel would be reimbursed. In return they would be expected to visit all those requesting help, be involved in public health and school work, attend midwifery cases and provide themselves with adequate transport. The service also planned an expansion of nursing services with associated nursing accommodation, provide state support to the hospitals and specialists and purchase ambulances. The service was administered by a Board of between five and nine with the first Chair being Sir John Dewar. After an initial survey they predicted an increase in doctors from 170 to 185 and an additional 100 new houses. They requested and were granted an annual treasury grant of £42,000.

== Early years ==
The service had an uncertain start. An early achievement was the posting of a nurse to St Kilda. The First World War held back developments. The service supported doctors' salaries and their travel expenses. In 1919, administration moved to the Scottish Board of Health. In due course, it provided adequate medical services to the population, and supported doctors to live and work in the area. Eventually other aspects of the service were developed including support for specialist surgeons and physicians, a laboratory in Inverness and even the first air ambulance service to the outer isles in 1936.

The Frontier Nursing Service in Kentucky, United States, was built on the HIMS model, as was Newfoundland's Cottage Hospital System.

== Timeline ==
- 1845 Poor Law Act gives limited provision of medical care to remote areas
- 1885 Poor Law amendment Act directed funds to urban poorhouses and away from rural provision
- 1910 Dewar Report published describing wholly inadequate medical provision in Highlands & Islands
- 1912 National Health Insurance Scheme set up but unworkable in crofting communities
- 1913 Highlands & Islands Medical Service set up.
- 1914 Provision of travel support provided to doctors and resident nurse appointed to St Kilda
- 1916 Grant provided to prevent the closure of Belford Hospital in Fort William
- 1919 Control moved to Scottish Board of Health
- 1920 MacAlister Report stressed importance of: "... personal service, such as can be rendered to the people in their own homes only by a family doctor who has continuous care of their health".
- 1924 First consultant appointment - General Surgeon for Stornoway Hospital
- 1929 73 District Nursing Associations established employing 175 nurses.
- 1933 first Air ambulance journey, from Islay on a Midland & Scottish Air Ferries flight to Glasgow
- 1934 Consultant surgeons established in Shetland, Orkney, Caithness & Lewis
- 1935 Consultant Physician appointed in Inverness
- 1936 Air ambulance service to Western Isles established
- 1936 Cathcart Report: "This service has revolutionised medical provision in the Highlands. It is now reasonably adequate in the sense that for all districts the services of a doctor are available on reasonable terms."
- 1942 Beveridge Commission included Miss Muriel Ritson CBE of the Department of Health for Scotland. She had previously been an administrator for the HIMS.
- 1948 NHS took over from HIMS

== See also ==
- Emergency Hospital Service
