= Frank Osgood Butler =

American industrialist (1861–1955)

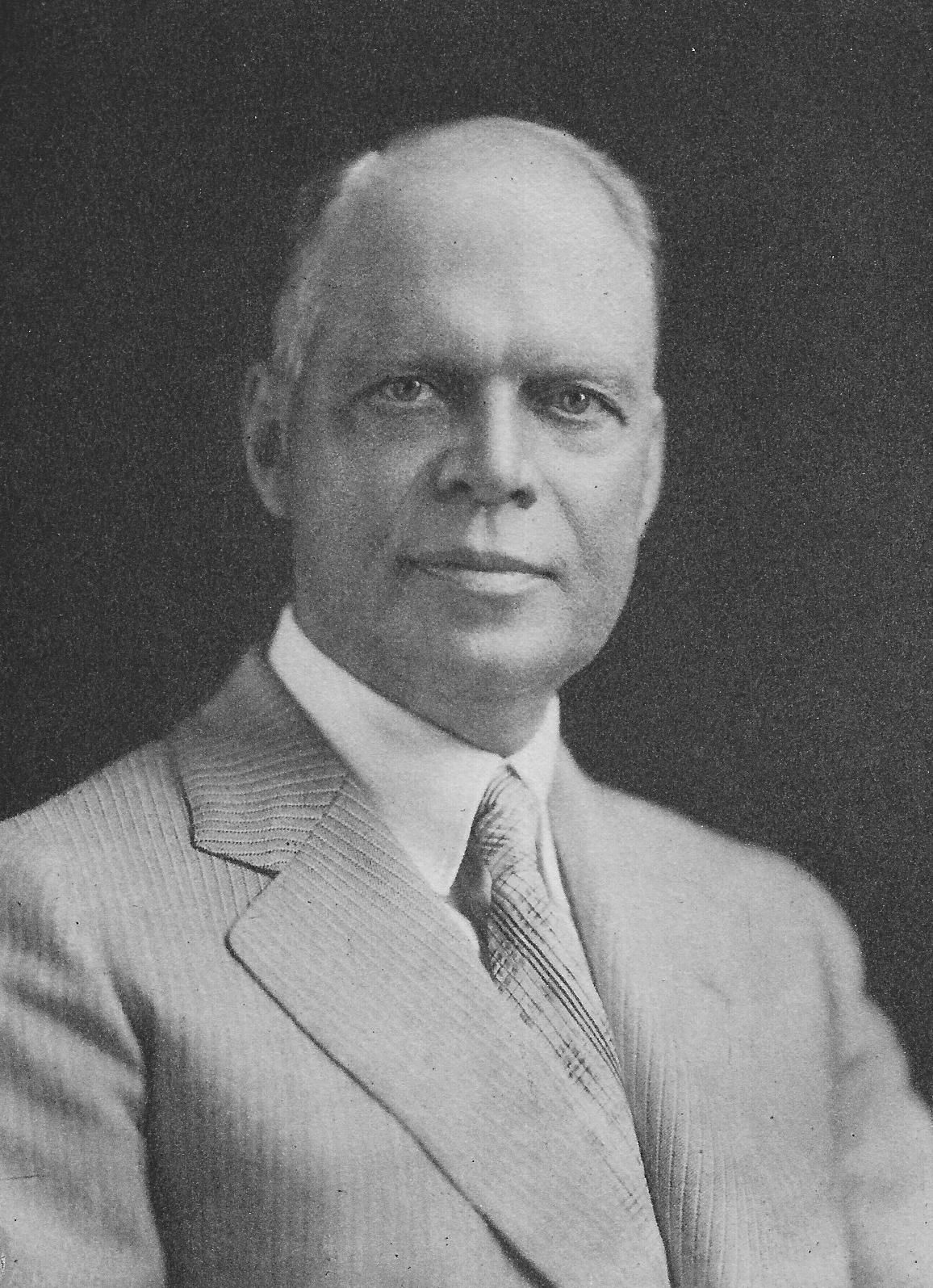
- Frank Osgood Butler, 1930
- Born: April 22, 1861; Chicago, Illinois, U.S.
- Died: March 18, 1955 (aged 93); Palm Beach, Florida, U.S.
- Occupations: Industrialist, polo player
- Children: 2 (including Paul Butler)
- Parents: Julius Wales Butler (father); Julia Anna Osgood (mother)
- Relatives: Norman Butler (grandson); Michael Butler (grandson)

Frank Osgood Butler (April 22 1861 - March 18, 1955) was an American industrialist and polo player.

== Early life ==
Frank Osgood Butler was born in Chicago, Illinois on April 22, 1861. He was the son of industrialist Julius Wales Butler, co-founder with his brother Oliver Morris Butler of the J.W. Butler Paper Company in Chicago in 1841. His mother was Julia Anna Osgood. He had a brother called Julius Fred Butler.

== Career ==
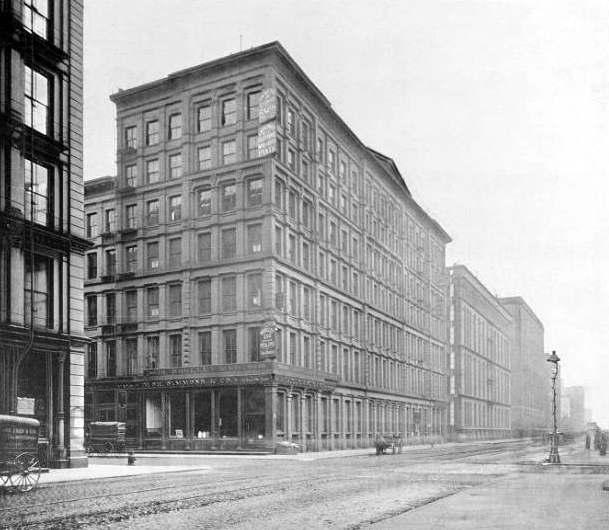
Butler Paper Building, Chicago, 1898

Frank Osgood Butler alongside his father Julius Wales Butler consolidated Butler Paper into one of the largest paper companies in the world. He became known as the "Paper Mountain" for his success as a paper tycoon.

In the 19th century Julius Wales Butler began buying land outside of Chicago. Frank Osgood Butler continued purchasing land after he settled in Hinsdale, Illinois. These property holdings would later become the village of Oak Brook, Illinois.

In 1910 he and his wife Fanny began wintering in Palm Beach, Florida. They built a house on Via Bethesda, and at one time owned all of the land on the Via Bethesda block, later donating part of the land for the building of Bethesda-by-the-Sea Episcopal Church and the Cluett Memorial Garden. Frank Osgood Butler was one of the founder members of the Everglades Club. He was also a member of the Cercle de l'Union interalliée, the Chicago Historical Society and the General Society of Colonial Wars.

F.O. Butler was also a resident of Hot Springs, South Dakota, owning a Chinese style pavilion house there. He created the F.O. Butler Foundation as a trust with South Dakota State University.

In the late 1910s he donated the land for what became the Butler School in Oak Brook, Illinois. The Butler School was added to the register of National Register of Historic Places in 2003.

In 1930 he handed over the Presidency of the Butler Paper Corporation to his son Paul Butler, and which later diversified from paper into real estate and aviation.

== Polo ==
F.O. Butler first became interested in polo in 1909 when the US beat Britain in the prestigious Westchester Polo Cup.

He began playing polo on his estate in Hinsdale, Illinois, building the first polo ground in the Chicago area. With his son Paul Butler he registered the Oak Brook Polo Club in 1922.

Since the 19th century the family had owned large ranches in South Dakota and Montana. F.O Butler decided to start breeding polo ponies on his ranches and introduced polo there in 1925.

== Personal life ==
In 1866 he married Fanny Maude Bremaker (1865–1959), who was from Louisville, Kentucky. She was a society hostess known for her love of lavish parties which she would host at the The Palmer House in Chicago and at her winter homes in Palm Beach. They had two sons, industrialist Paul Butler and Julius Wales Butler.

Frank Osgood Butler died in 1955 aged 93, at his Palm Beach home La Claridad on 16 Golfview Road.

He was buried at the Butler family mausoleum in Oak Brook, Illinois which he built in 1935.
