= Baron Forteviot =

Title in the Peerage of the United Kingdom

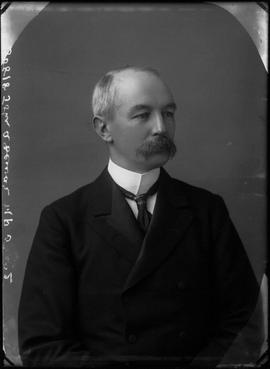
early 1900s portrait of John Dewar

Baron Forteviot, of Dupplin in the County of Perth, is a title in the Peerage of the United Kingdom. It was created 4 January 1917 for the Scottish businessman and Liberal Member of Parliament, Sir John Dewar, 1st Baronet. He was Chairman of the Scotch Whisky distilling company John Dewar and Sons and also represented Inverness-shire in the House of Commons. Dewar had already been created a baronet, of the City of Perth, on 24 July 1907. Since 2026, the titles have been held by his great-grandson, the fifth Baron.

The name Forteviot comes from the historic village, the last Pictish capital of Scotland. Kenneth MacAlpin, King of the Scots, died at Forteviot in 859.

== Barons Forteviot (1917) ==
- John Alexander Dewar, 1st Baron Forteviot DL(1856–1929)
- John Dewar, 2nd Baron Forteviot OBE MC TD FRSE DL JP (1885–1947)
- Henry Evelyn Alexander Dewar, 3rd Baron Forteviot MBE (1906–1993)
- John James Evelyn Dewar, 4th Baron Forteviot (1938–2026)
- Alexander Dewar, 5th Baron Forteviot (born 1971)

The heir apparent is the present holder's son the Hon. James Dewar (born 2001).

== Sources ==
- Hesilrige, Arthur G. M. (1921). Debrett's Peerage and Titles of courtesy. London: London: Dean & son, limited. p. 382.

Baronetage of the United Kingdom
Preceded by Hughes-Hunter baronets	Dewar baronets of Dupplin; 10 July 1907	Succeeded by Scotter baronets
