= Dewar Cup Trophy =

The Sir Thomas Dewar Cup

The Sir Thomas Dewar Cup, more commonly known as the Dewar Cup, was the trophy awarded to the winner of the National Challenge Cup/Lamar Hunt U.S. Open Cup competition. It is named after Sir Thomas Dewar as a tribute to his works promoting soccer in the U.S. in the early 1900s. Though the trophy is now on permanent display at the National Soccer Hall of Fame in Frisco, Texas, each winning club's name is still added to the base of the trophy each year.
