= Academy of Medical Royal Colleges and Faculties in Scotland =

The Academy of Medical Royal Colleges and Faculties in Scotland is commonly known as the "Scottish Academy", but is not to be confused with the Royal Scottish Academy, which promotes contemporary Scottish art.

It is analogous to the Academy of Medical Royal Colleges but is an independent organisation.

The member organisations are:

- Faculties of Dental Surgery
- Faculty of Occupational Medicine
- Faculty of Public Health
- Royal College of Anaesthetists
- Royal College of Emergency Medicine
- Royal College of General Practitioners
- Royal College of Obstetricians and Gynaecologists
- Royal College of Ophthalmologists
- Royal College of Pathologists
- Royal College of Physicians and Surgeons of Glasgow
- Royal College of Physicians of Edinburgh
- Royal College of Psychiatrists
- Royal College of Radiologists
- Royal College of Surgeons of Edinburgh
- Scottish Committee of the Royal College of Paediatrics and Child Health

Trainee doctor representatives from the member organisations form the Scottish Academy Trainee Doctors' Group (SATDG). This provides trainee input into the work of the Scottish Academy and also acts as an independent, coordinated trainee voice in Scotland.

The Academy produced a report entitled "Learning from serious failings in care" in July 2015. The investigation was launched after recent scandals in the health service and found the problems had been predominantly caused by the failure of clinical staff and NHS management to work together. They found leadership and accountability were often lacking but bullying was endemic Their 20 recommendations for improvements in the NHS included a set of minimum safe staffing levels for consultants, doctors, nurses and other staff in hospital settings. They criticised a target driven culture, saying: "Quality care must become the primary influence on patient experience... and the primary indicator of performance."
