= Solid State Pharmaceutical Cluster =

The Solid State Pharmaceutical Cluster (SSPC) is a Science Foundation Ireland (SFI) strategic research cluster established in 2007 with funding of €6.97 million and currently comprises 39 researchers. It was officially launched on July 4, 2008 at the University of Limerick, Ireland. The brief was to carry out applied research in the area of Pharmaceutical Crystallization.

The cluster is a collaboration between Universities Researchers and Pharmaceutical companies in Ireland. The academic contributors are University of Limerick, National University of Ireland, Galway, Trinity College Dublin, University College Dublin and University College Cork. The Pharmaceutical Company members are Janssen, Schering Plough, GlaxoSmithKline, Merck Sharpe & Dohme, Roche, Pfizer, Eli Lilly, Clarochem, Hovione, and Bristol Myers Squibb.

The cluster has developed a Best Practice in Crysatallization website (BPX) which the Irish Minister for Enterprise, Trade and Employment, Mary Coughlan TD, launched on November 6, 2009 at the Materials & Surface Science Institute, University of Limerick. The formation of BPX.ie is a result of the combined efforts of academic and industrial members of the SSPC, working together to define the current state of the art in pharmaceutical crystallization.
