= Paul Butler (polo) =

American heir, businessman, and polo player

- Paul Butler, 1932

Personal information
- Born: June 23, 1892 Chicago, Illinois, US
- Died: June 24, 1981 (age 89) Oak Brook
- Education: University of Illinois at Urbana–Champaign
- Occupations: Heir and businessman
- Spouses: Sarah Anne Josephine Rooney, Marjorie Stresenreuter, Jean Buckley
- Children: 4
- Parents: Frank Osgood Butler (father); Fanny Maude Bremaker (mother)

Sport
- Country: United States
- Sport: Polo
- Club: Meadowbrook Polo Club, Oak Brook Polo Club
- Retired: Honorary Chairman of the United States Polo Association (1966-1972), U.S. Polo Hall of Fame (1995)

Achievements and titles
- National finals: 6

Paul Butler (1892–1981) was an American heir, businessman and polo player.

== Biography ==
=== Early life ===
Paul Butler was born on June 23, 1892, in Chicago, Illinois. His Anglo-Irish family first arrived in New England in the early 17th-century. In the early 1800s, his ancestors Asa and Simon Butler were the first American paper makers to make paper for the U.S. Congress. In the 1830s, Oliver Morris Butler built a paper mill on the Fox River in Illinois. His grandfather, Julius Wales Butler, was the founder of the J.W. Butler Paper Company on State Street in Chicago in 1841, the oldest family owned business in Chicago. He also had a brother named Julius. He graduated from the University of Illinois at Urbana–Champaign. He served as a Lieutenant pilot during the First World War. From 1928 to 1932 he served as a civilian aide to the Secretary of War.

=== Business ===
He served as President of his family business, the Butler Paper Company, from 1930 to 1965. By then, the company had diversified in paper, real estate and development. From 1960 to 1965, he served as President of the Nekoosa-Edwards Paper Company. He was a founder of Oak Brook, Illinois, including the Bank of Oak Brook and the Oak Brook Public Utilities Company. He also founded the Butler National Golf Club. In 1945, he founded the Butler Aviation Corporation, the largest general aviation company in the United States.

The Butler family owned 5,800 acres of land outside Chicago, that is now the village of Oak Brook, Illinois, where the family would host polo tournaments, skeet shoots and fox hunting.

In 1951 he was named head of the Defense Air Transportation Administration, a then newly formed government agency to coordinate aviation facilities and equipment for defense.

He was a member of the General Society of Colonial Wars, the Chicago Historical Society, the Chicago Art Institute and the Chicago Museum of Natural History, Cercle de l'Union Interalliée in Paris, and a founder member of the Everglades Club and member of the Bath and Tennis in Palm Beach.

=== Polo ===
In 1922, Paul and his father Frank Osgood Butler registered the Oak Brook Polo Club with the United States Polo Association (USPA), making the club the fourth oldest in the United States. When the Meadowbrook Club was taken over by golfers some time after World War II, the Governors of the USPA came to Oak Brook to meet with Paul Butler to ask him to host the U.S. Open at Oak Brook, which by then had 14 polo fields and a private airstrip. Paul agreed to host the U.S. Open, and it was held in Oak Brook for 23 of 25 years between 1954 and 1978. During that time the polo and the entire Oak Brook Sports Corp, as the Butler's Oak Brook land holdings were known, were managed either by Paul Butler's son Michael or his daughter Jorie. Jorie managed the entire operation from 1968 until the early 1980s.

He won six U.S. Open Polo Championships and four Butler Handicap titles. He was himself a top level polo player, with a four-goal handicap.

He was Honorary Chairman of the United States Polo Association from 1966 to 1972, succeeding Harry Payne Whitney and Robert Early Strawbridge Jr.

He served on the Board of Governors of the USPA for 29 years.

He also served on the Board of Governors of the Palm Beach Polo and Country Club.

He was a member of the Meadowbrook Polo Club. He played in the last final of the U.S. Open Polo Championship to be held at Meadowbrook Polo Club, in 1953, when his Chicago team including Cecil Smith lost to Meadow Brook 4-7.

He was inducted in the Museum of Polo and Hall of Fame on March 3, 1995.

The high-goal Butler Handicap tournament played before the U.S. Open is named for him.

=== Personal life ===
He was married three times, to Sarah Anne Josephine Rooney, Marjorie Stresenreuter (later Mrs William Dunaway) and Jean Buckley. He had one son from his first marriage, Norman Butler, also a polo player. He had three children from his second marriage, Michael Butler, a theatrical producer and businessman, who is the father of Adam Butler, a polo player, and grandfather of Liam Butler; Frank Osgood Butler II and a daughter, Jorie Butler Kent, who has a daughter, photographer Reute Butler.

== Death ==
Butler was killed on June 24, 1981, one day after his 89th birthday, when he was struck by a car in front of his home in Oak Brook. Butler had walked out in front of his home at 1000 Oak Brook Road, at dusk, possibly to take photographs, when he was hit by a driver. At the time, his net worth was estimated at "between $50 million and $125 million".
