= John Gillies (doctor) =

Scottish medical doctor

- Born: North Uist, Scotland
- Education: University of Edinburgh
- Years active: 1975–present
- Known for: Chair of RCGP Scotland
- Medical career
- Profession: doctor
- Field: General Practitioner
- Sub-specialties: Global health

John Calum Macdonald Gillies OBE FRCGP FRCPE FRSE is a medical doctor and honorary professor at the University of Edinburgh. He worked as general practitioner (GP) and was formerly the chair of the Scottish Council of the Royal College of General Practitioners (RCGP) from 2010 to 2014 and was Depute Director of the Scottish School of Primary Care.

== Early career ==
Gillies was born in North Uist, Scotland. He studied at the University of Edinburgh, qualifying in medicine in 1975. Gilles travelled to Africa, working as a District Medical Officer in Ntcheu District Hospital, Malawi for 3 years. He gained his Membership of the Royal College of Physicians (MRCP) in 1978.

== GP principal ==
Gillies returned to the United Kingdom and trained in general practice, gaining his Membership of the Royal College of General Practitioners (MRCGP) in 1985. From 1985 he worked as a GP principal in Glenluce, Wigtownshire. He then moved to Selkirk in the Scottish Borders in 1996 where he worked for the 16 years in until he retired from clinical practise in 2012. During the latter part of this time he was working as a GP trainer.

== Academic GP ==
Gillies was an Honorary Senior Lecturer at the University of Edinburgh. He was one of the authors of Distilling the Essence of General Practice which looked at the important and unique advantages of general practice and the development of primary care throughout the UK. He was involved with education initiatives in Africa. He is an associate member of the University of Edinburgh's Global Health Academy. Gillies was on the members advisory board of the Wesleyan Assurance Society. He was chair of the Reference Group of the Scottish Government Health Department's Out of Hours Primary Care Review that reported in 2015. He chaired a group that looked into undergraduate medical education in Scotland that reported in 2019.

Gilles was involved with an initiative that presented a book of poems Tools of the Trade to every newly qualified doctor in Scotland.

== RCGP Scotland chair ==
Gilles was elected by the members of RCGP's Scottish Council to be chair, taking up the position in November 2010. His priorities as chair were to promote generalism and leadership in general practice. He took up the chairmanship when integration of health and social care was progressing in Scotland, while legislation enacted in England saw a focus on competition. During his time as chair of RCGP's Scottish council he spoke out about health inequalities and about the support needed for GP practices to improve quality. In October 2013 he travelled to the Western Isles to unveil a memorial to a dedicated family of doctors. In November 2013 his chairmanship was extended for another year. He delivered a petition to the office of First Minister, signed by 21,000 Scots calling for further resources to be put towards general practice. He was succeeded by Miles Mack in November 2014.

== Awards and honours ==
Gillies was appointed Officer of the Order of the British Empire (OBE) in the 2016 New Year Honours for services to general practice. In 2018 he was elected a Fellow of the Royal Society of Edinburgh.

== Personal life ==
He was married to Mary, who also worked as a GP, and died in 2022. They have two children together.
