= Scottish School of Primary Care =

Scottish organization

Coordinates: 55°52′44″N 4°17′50″W

The Scottish School of Primary Care (SSPC) is an organisation that co-ordinates a programme of research and training of primary care in Scotland. It is a virtual organisation comprising all academic departments in Scotland that have a significant research output in the primary care domain. The Co-Directors are Professor Jill Hubbard and Professor Lindsey Pope.

== History ==
The School was launched in 2000. It was formed in response to a report produced by the Scottish Forum for Academic General Practice. The first two years were a foundation phase. Funding came from the Scottish Executive's Chief Scientist Office (CSO) and the Scottish Higher Education Funding Council (SHEFC) with both organisations each committing to provide £600,000 over the first three years.

It supported nurses and midwives involvement in research by being involved in promoting both capacity and capability building. By 2007 there were 1700 people involved in this virtual organisation, including Scottish academics with an interest in primary care research and clinicians who have an involvement with research alongside their normal clinical work.

A programme of work at the school led to the publication of landmark paper on multimorbidity in 2012. The Journal of Comorbidity later affiliated with the school.

In June 2015, the Scottish Government announced a primary care fund which included £1.25 million toward the school. By 2017, this was funding the school to be involved in the evaluation the primary care transformation projects and to help establish collections of primary care evidence.

In 2007, Frank Sullivan was appointed Director. In September 2015, John Gillies took up the position of Depute Director. The school has been led by two Co-Directors since early 2021: Professor Gill Hubbard (University of Highlands and Islands) and Professor Lindsey Pope (University of Glasgow).

As of 2024, members include the Universities of Edinburgh, Aberdeen, Dundee, Glasgow, Highlands and Islands, Stirling, Strathclyde, St Andrews and Robert Gordon University.
