= John Dewar, 1st Baron Forteviot =

British Baron

The Right Honourable The Lord Forteviot
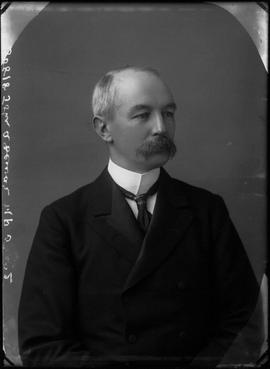
- John Dewar, early 1900s

Member of Parliament for Inverness-shire
- In office 1900–1917

Personal details
- Born: 6 June 1856
- Died: 23 November 1929 (aged 73)
- Party: Liberal
- Spouse(s): Johann Tod (m. 1884; died 1899) Margaret Holland (m. 1905)
- Children: 8, including John and Henry
- Parent: John Dewar, Sr. (father)
- Relatives: Thomas Dewar (brother); Arthur Dewar (brother)
- Occupation: Businessman, whisky distiller

John Alexander Dewar, 1st Baron Forteviot DL (6 June 1856 – 23 November 1929) was a Scottish businessman, elder son of the founder of John Dewar & Sons company and a Liberal Member of Parliament.

== Career ==
Lord Forteviot was chairman of the distilling firm John Dewar and Sons and a director of Buchanan-Dewar Ltd and of Distillers Company Ltd. He also represented Inverness-shire in the House of Commons from 1900 to 1917 and was twice Lord Provost of Perth. He was created a Baronet in 1907 and in 1917 he was raised to the peerage as Baron Forteviot, of Dupplin in the County of Perth.

In 1912 he chaired the Dewar Commission, an examination of the state of healthcare provision in the Highlands and Islands of Scotland. The Commission took evidence in the form of written submissions and personal interviews throughout the North, beginning on 15 August 1912 at the Local Government Board Offices in Edinburgh, but moving on by the third day to Inverness and other parts of the north. The "Dewar Report" or Highlands and Islands Medical Service Committee (1912) Report to the Lords Commissioners of His Majesty's Treasury was presented to Parliament in 1913, resulting in the establishment of the Highlands and Islands Medical Service.

== Family ==
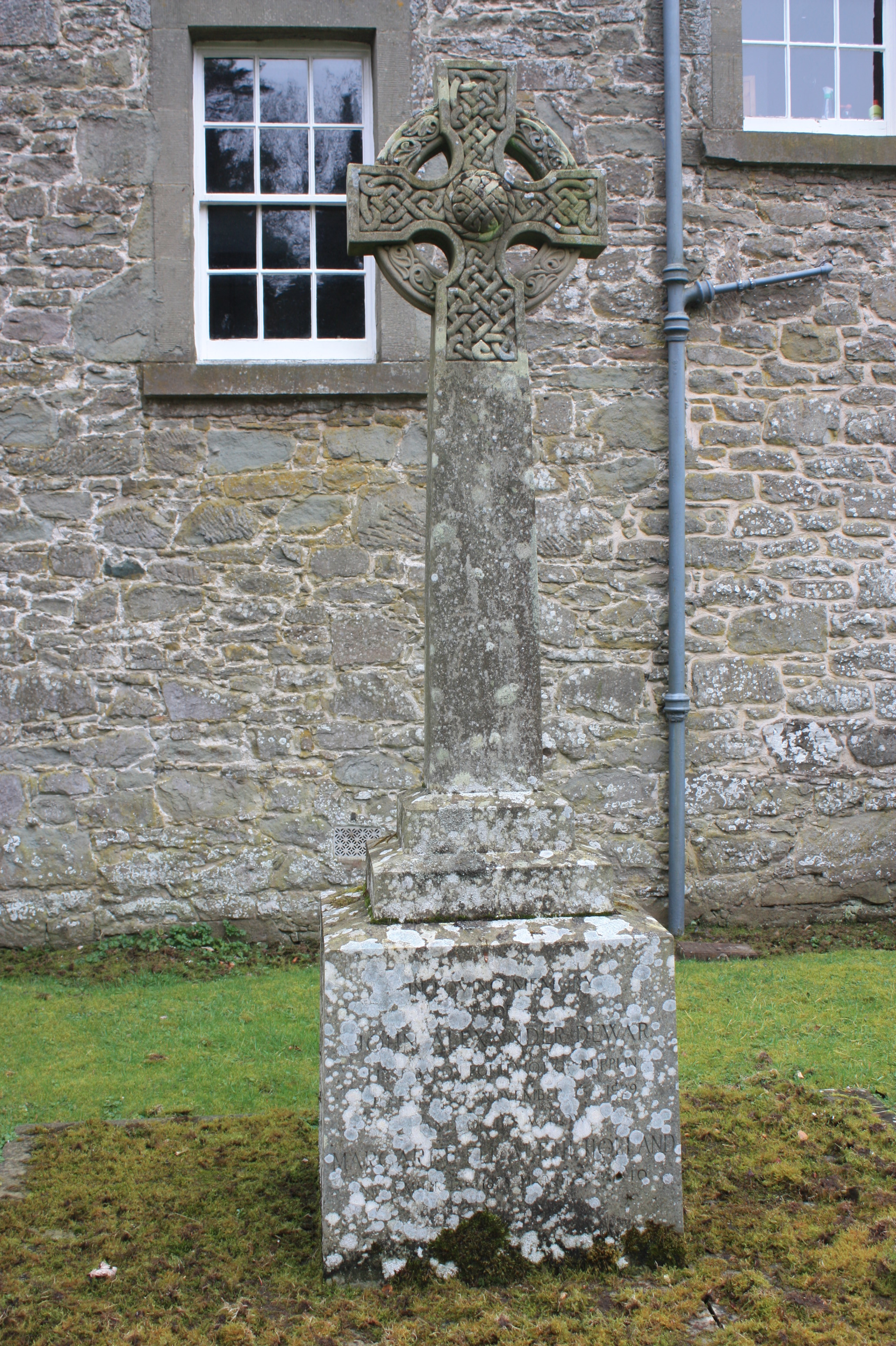
The grave of John Dewar, 1st Baron Forteviot, Aberdalgie

John Dewar Jr. was the son of John Dewar, Sr. and Jane Gow, and older brother of Thomas Dewar, 1st Baron Dewar, and Arthur Dewar.

He married Elsie Johann (Joan) Tod (fourth daughter of Lord Forteviot of Dupplin) in 1884, however, she died in 1899. In 1905, he married Margaret Elizabeth Holland, daughter of Henry Holland.

Children with Johann Todd:

- John Dewar, 2nd Baron Forteviot FRSE MC (17 March 1885 – 24 October 1947)
- Hon. Agnes Roger Dewar (6 June 1888 – 30 March 1919); married John James Strutt, son of Hon. Edward Gerald Strutt, and has issue
- Hon. Jane Gow Dewar (12 May 1890 – 6 June 1969); married with issue
- Hon. Margaret Dorothy Dewar (7 July 1891 – 11 October 1967); married Arthur Lawrence Cecil Neame, had issue
- Hon. Elsie Joan Tod Dewar (24 November 1892 – 23 February 1917); unmarried
- Hon. Janet Bertha Dewar (1895 – 1979); married with issue

Children with Elizabeth Holland:

- Henry Evelyn Alexander Dewar, 3rd Baron Forteviot (23 February 1906 – 25 March 1993); married with issue including the 4th Baron Forteviot
- Hon. Irene Margaretta Dewar (21 July 1908)

== Death ==
Lord Forteviot died in November 1929, aged 73, and was succeeded in his titles by his son from his first marriage, John.

He is buried with his family in the family plot at Aberdalgie just west of Perth, near the family seat of Dupplin.

== Sources ==
- Kidd, Charles, Williamson, David (editors). Debrett's Peerage and Baronetage (1990 edition). New York: St Martin's Press, 1990
- Campaign to celebrate Scot who laid foundations of NHS 100 years ago, dailyrecord.co.uk. Accessed 7 January 2023.

Parliament of the United Kingdom
| Preceded by James Evan Bruce Baillie | Member of Parliament for Inverness-shire; 1900–1917 | Succeeded by Thomas Morison |
Peerage of the United Kingdom
| New creation | Baron Forteviot; 1917–1929 | Succeeded by John Dewar |
Baronetage of the United Kingdom
| New creation | Baronet (of Dupplin); 1907–1929 | Succeeded by John Dewar |
