= Dupplin Castle =

Country house and former castle in Perth and Kinross, Scotland

Coordinates: 56.3582°N 3.5288°W

Designations

Inventory of Gardens and Designed Landscapes in Scotland
- Official name: Dupplin Castle
- Designated: 31 March 2007
- Reference no.: GDL00165

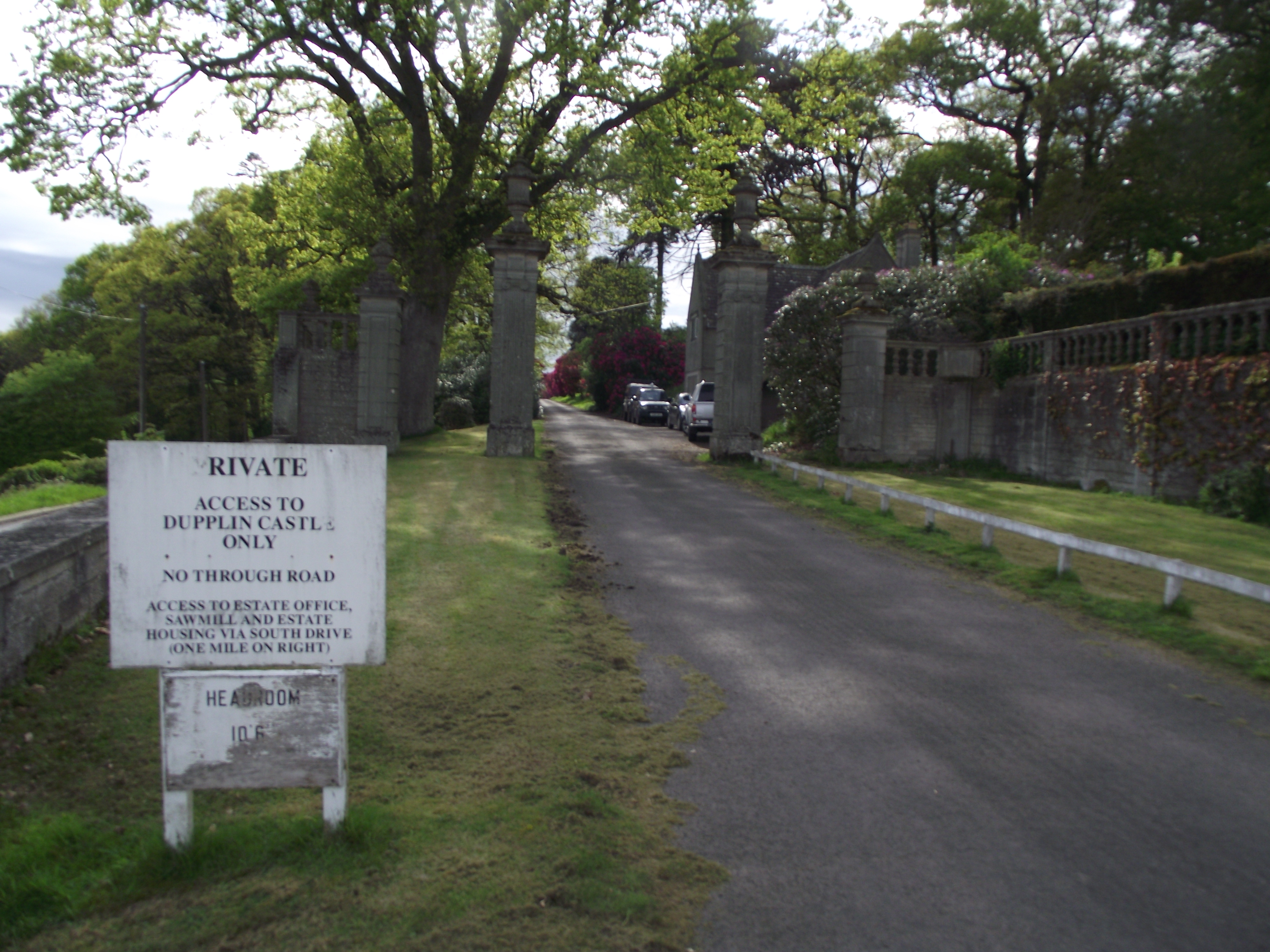
Driveway of Dupplin Castle

Dupplin Castle is a country house and former castle in Perth and Kinross, Scotland, situated to the west of Aberdalgie and northeast of Forteviot and Dunning. It overlooks Strath Earn.

The earliest known owner of the castle was Sir William Oliphant in the late 13th century. The Battle of Dupplin Moor took place in the vicinity in 1332, when it was won by Edward Baliol.

The castle was destroyed in 1461 and rebuilt. Dupplin was sold after some four hundred years by the 5th Lord Oliphant (who, per the diploma registered under the Great Seal, 10 March 1640, was also Lord Aberdalgie and Lord Dupplin) in 1623. It fell into the Hay family, after it was granted to Charles I's Lord Chancellor, the 1st Earl of Kinnoull. It was again rebuilt in 1688, though retained its earlier tower and some remnants of the earlier castle. In 1729 the estate was relandscaped including infilling of a deep precipice between two hills.

A fire gutted the castle in 1827, prompting a full rebuilding and restoration.

The castle was rebuilt as a country house under architect William Burn in 1828–32 at a cost of roughly £30,000. In 1911 it was purchased by whisky baron Sir John Dewar, who was ennobled as Lord Forteviot of Dupplin five years later. In the 1920s or 1930s there was a fire in the interior (July 18, 1934). It was demolished in August–October 1967. A new house was built in 1970 on the foundations.
