= Butler School (Oak Brook, Illinois) =

- U.S. National Register of Historic Places
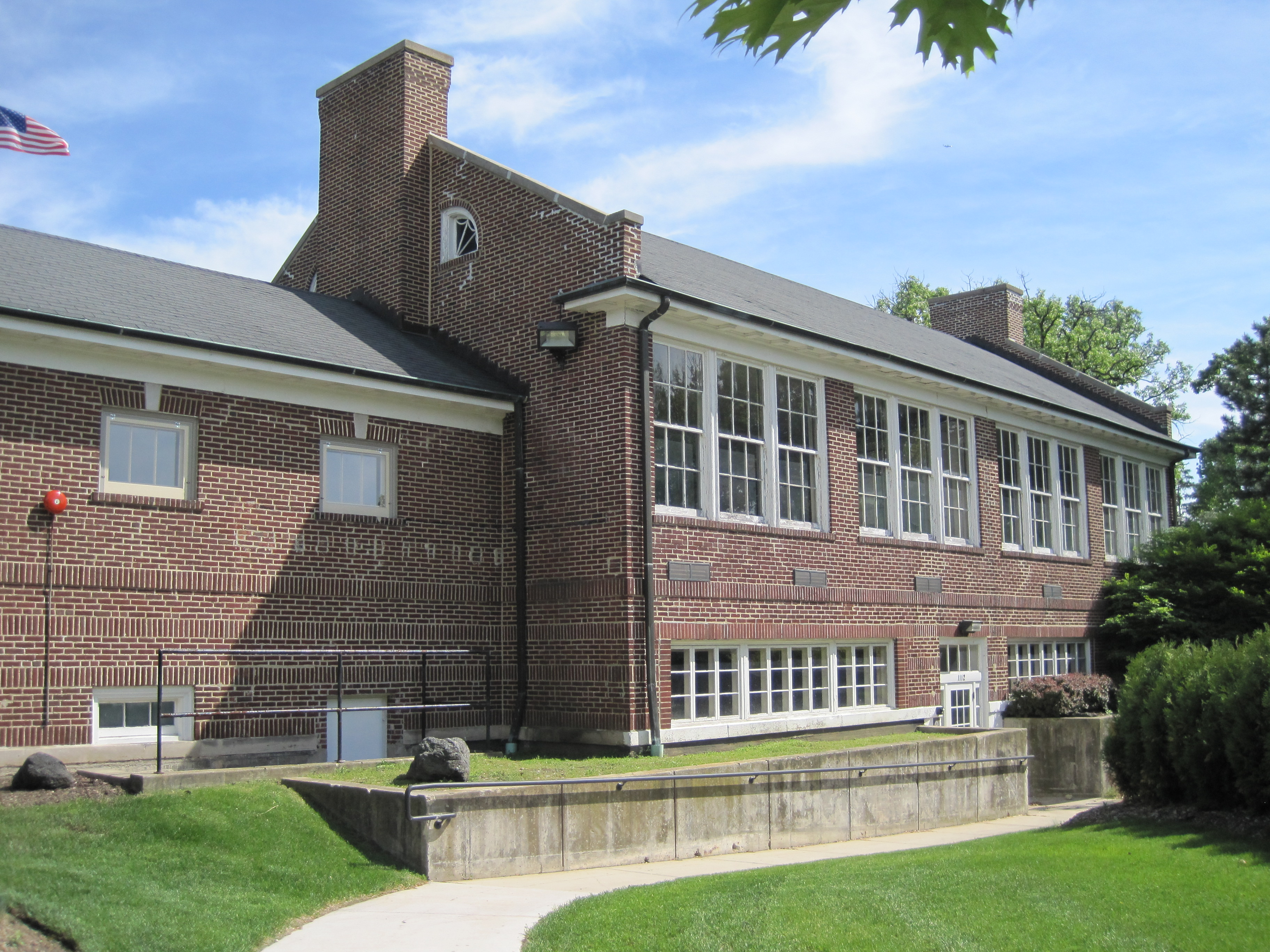
- Butler School in 2011

- Location within Illinois Location within the United States
- Location: 2871 31st. St. (Oak Brook Rd.); Oak Brook, Illinois, U.S.
- Coordinates: 41°50′5″N 87°56′46″W
- Built: c. 1921
- Architectural style: Georgian Revival
- NRHP reference No.: 03000355
- Added to NRHP: May 9, 2003

Butler School is a historic building in Oak Brook, Illinois. Frank Osgood Butler donated the land for the two-room schoolhouse in the late 1910s. The building became a meeting place for locals, and hosted the first club to use the term "Oak Brook" to refer to the surrounding settlement. The former school was briefly used as the village hall, police station, and library, until new buildings were constructed for those purposes in the 1970s. It was added to the National Register of Historic Places in 2003.

== History ==
The building was constructed as a two-room schoolhouse in 1921 and functioned in this capacity until 1961. Frank Osgood Butler was the son of a wealthy businessman who bought a farm as a summer home in between the burgeoning suburbs of Elmhurst and Hinsdale in 1898. Butler gradually increased the size of his holdings by purchasing his neighbors' lots and businesses.

It was Butler who donated a small 10 acres (4.0 ha) tract of land to the city and funded the construction of a new school. The region was home to two one-story schools at the time, and Butler wanted to create an educational environment that was notable at the state level. The architect of the Georgian Style school is unknown; the style was among the most common in the interwar period for its patriot connotations. Grades one through four were taught in one classroom, while five through eight were taught in the other. A traveling music teacher visited the school once a week to teach piano. The school was originally in Consolidated School District #17 and was reassigned to Consolidated School District #53 in 1926. Butler's large holdings in the area stunted local development, and attendance was unable to significantly increase over the forty-year period. An average of fifty-two students attended class each year. The school became an important place for social gatherings and hosted games, sports, and drama. A civic organization that met in the school was the first to use the term "Oak Brook" to refer to the surrounding community. The village adopted the name after it was incorporated in 1958.

Two newly constructed highways, the Tri-State and the East-West Tollway, offered the potential of town growth. In addition, Marshall Field purchased a local tract of land to develop into the Oakbrook Center shopping mall. To prepare for this, the Butler family traded Butler School to the village for a new tract of land for a seven-room school. Butler School was re-purposed as a Village Hall, Police Station, and library. As the village continued to reap the benefits of its increased commerce, a new Village Hall was erected in 1975, and the former Butler School was used solely as a library. In 2001, a new library was constructed and the school was converted to a museum. It was added to the National Register of Historic Places in 2003.

The schoolhouse is considered an example of Georgian Revival architecture with Federal Style details. The building is rectangular, with the long side running north to south, with a wing on the east and the west. The rectangular portion is 62 by 34 feet (19 by 10 m), the east wing is 28 by 18 feet (8.5 by 5.5 m), and the west wind is 18 by 18 feet (5.5 by 5.5 m), combining for approximately 6,000 square feet (560 m^{2}). It is made of brick with wooden trim and windows. Like many Georgian Revival buildings, there are chimneys on opposite ends of the building. The chimneys both have a cement cap. A fanlight sits above the main door on the south facade; the doorway still has its original three-paneled wood doors. It opens to the vestibule, where a metal staircase leads to the second floor. Though the stairs have since been carpeted, the staircase maintains its original balustrade with matching newels. The north end of the vestibule as an elliptical fanlight. Windows are double hung and feature a brick lintel with a keystone.
