= Dewar Report =

The Report of the Highlands and Islands Medical Service Committee or the Dewar Report was published in 1912 and named after its chair, Sir John Dewar. The report presented a vivid description of the social landscape of the time and highlighted the desperate state of medical provision to the population, particularly in the rural areas of the Highlands and Islands of Scotland. The report recommended setting up a new, centrally planned provision of care that within 20 years transformed medical services to the area. This organisation, the Highlands and Islands Medical Service was widely cited in the Cathcart Report and acted as a working blueprint for the NHS in Scotland. The report is written in clear language and many of its findings continue to have relevance to how medical services are planned and financed in Scotland and beyond.

The report was commissioned in 1910 to overcome the difficulties of implementing the forthcoming National Insurance Act 1911 in the crofting communities. In industrial areas the working population were expected to contribute a proportion of earnings to a central fund to provide medical care when needed. In the Highlands and Islands this was seen as unworkable as the majority of the population were in crofting occupations with little or no regular income. This report was following on from others such as Coldstream's report issued by the Royal College of Physicians of Edinburgh in 1852 and the Napier Report that both deplored the parlous state of medical services in the area. The remit of the enquiry was settled to be "...the counties of Argyll, Caithness, Inverness, Ross and Cromarty, Sutherland, Orkney and Shetland and from the Highlands of Perthshire, comprising the area in which isolation, topographical and climatic difficulties, and straitened financial circumstances are found most generally in combination, and, therefore, the area generally within which the question of adequate medical provision is most pressing."

== Collecting the evidence ==
The Committee gathered information by questionnaires sent to 102 doctors and 158 other persons and this was followed on by direct observation by an itinerary of meetings visiting: – Inverness, Thurso, Kirkwall, Fair Isle and Lerwick; at Lairg, Bettyhill, and Rhiconich in Sutherlandshire; at Stornoway and Garrynahine in the Isle of Lewis; at Tarbert, Harris; at Lochmaddy in North Uist; at Dunvegan and Portree in the Isle of Skye; and at Kyle of Lochalsh, Perth and Oban. They also held meetings in Edinburgh and Glasgow and reviewed available published reports and papers.

== Historical and social timeline ==
- Dismantling of Highland Clan system 17th century onwards, accelerated after 1745 Jacobite rising
- Scottish Enlightenment and resulting agricultural "improvements" and displacement of rural populations
- Persisting rural depopulation
- 1815 Battle of Waterloo - Effect of end of the Napoleonic Wars on collapse of kelp industry and collapse of beef prices
- 1845 Highland Potato Famine
- Highland Clearances
- 1845 Poor Law (amendment ) Act Paupers given rights to medical attention, paid by parochial councils
- 1850 Coldstream Report to Royal College Of Physicians (Edinburgh )(RCPE)
- 1852 RCPE report on survey of services
- 1884 Napier Commission Report
- 1886 Crofter's Holding Act
- 1904 Survey of application of Poor Law Medical Relief in Scotland

== Medical care in 1912 ==
Previous reports had already demonstrated the parlous state of medical provision in the area. The report quotes Dr Mackenzie of Uist's evidence to the Report of the Medical Relief Committee (1904):

"As I have frequently pointed out already, the want of sufficient medical attend and nursing have a most prejudicial effect on the well-being of the district. The loss of life, hardship and misery which this implies cannot be calculated. To a certain extent the physical evil is evident, while it tends to produce a callousness to suffering and death that becomes only too apparent in the number of uncertified deaths, especially among the aged."

=== Exceptional treatment ===
In Part II the case is made for special consideration of the area. It describes an area of sparse population, wild landscape and a rudimentary road network. Many people were miles from their doctor and there are examples of the doctors putting their own safety at risk to attend sick patients. In addition the people were extremely poor with inadequate diet and the housing was seen as insanitary and overcrowded:

"…houses of practically only one room, with damp walls, damp clay floors, sunless interiors, a vitiated and smoky atmosphere, and the cattle under the same roof with the human inmates, the surroundings usually badly drained, and the site often damp. When a case if phthisis occurs in one of these houses, isolation is impossible. In too many cases the patient spits on the floor of churches and meeting-houses, scattering the tubercle bacilli all round. When one considers also the probability of the cattle being affected with tuberculosis, under the conditions prevailing what else could we expect than a wide prevalence of the disease."

In addition the area continued to suffer from depopulation and local rates were inadequate to cover the cost of doctor's income. The newly reformed Insurance Act was of no assistance as so few of the population were in paid employment.

=== State of medical services ===
In Part III the report notes that many of the doctors had no security of tenure, had inadequate housing and inadequate income. As a result, they did not have access to appropriate transport and the telephone system was poorly developed. Doctors were unable to afford the cost of a locum so went without holidays and had no opportunity to undertake any continuing professional development.

=== Evidence of inadequacy of medical attendance ===
Perhaps the most shocking evidence related to uncertified deaths. For the County of Ross for the preceding 10 years 47.5% of all deaths were uncertified, the worst parish being Coigach where 81% of deaths were uncertified as there was no medical attendance. By contrast the rest of Scotland had a rate of uncertified deaths of 2%.

There are many accounts of doctors being called too late or not at all and awareness that many of the population were unable to pay a doctors fee. This fact was reinforced by evidence from the school medical inspectors who identified illness that would have not otherwise been brought to medical attention. The population seemed instead to resort to "quack medicine of American manufacture" together with a reliance on traditional "cures" and superstitions.

=== Provision of nurses and hospitals ===
The total number of nurses was reported to be low and the organisation and distribution was chaotic. In some part contributed to by the reliance on philanthropic activities to supply nurses to some areas. Their importance to an area in attending births, following up and continuing treatment and as a source of information on personal and domestic hygiene was emphasised.

== Recommendations made in the Dewar report ==
The report was detailed in its recommendations, namely that an imperial grant should be provided to enable a reorganisation of the medical services under a single organisation with patients paying a small fee for services and Doctors receiving a minimum salary with additional expenses for travel. It also recommended reorganisation of nursing services building of community hospitals, improvement of the telephones and provision for an ambulance service. Overtime these recommendations were undertaken by the formation of the Highlands and Islands Medical Service.

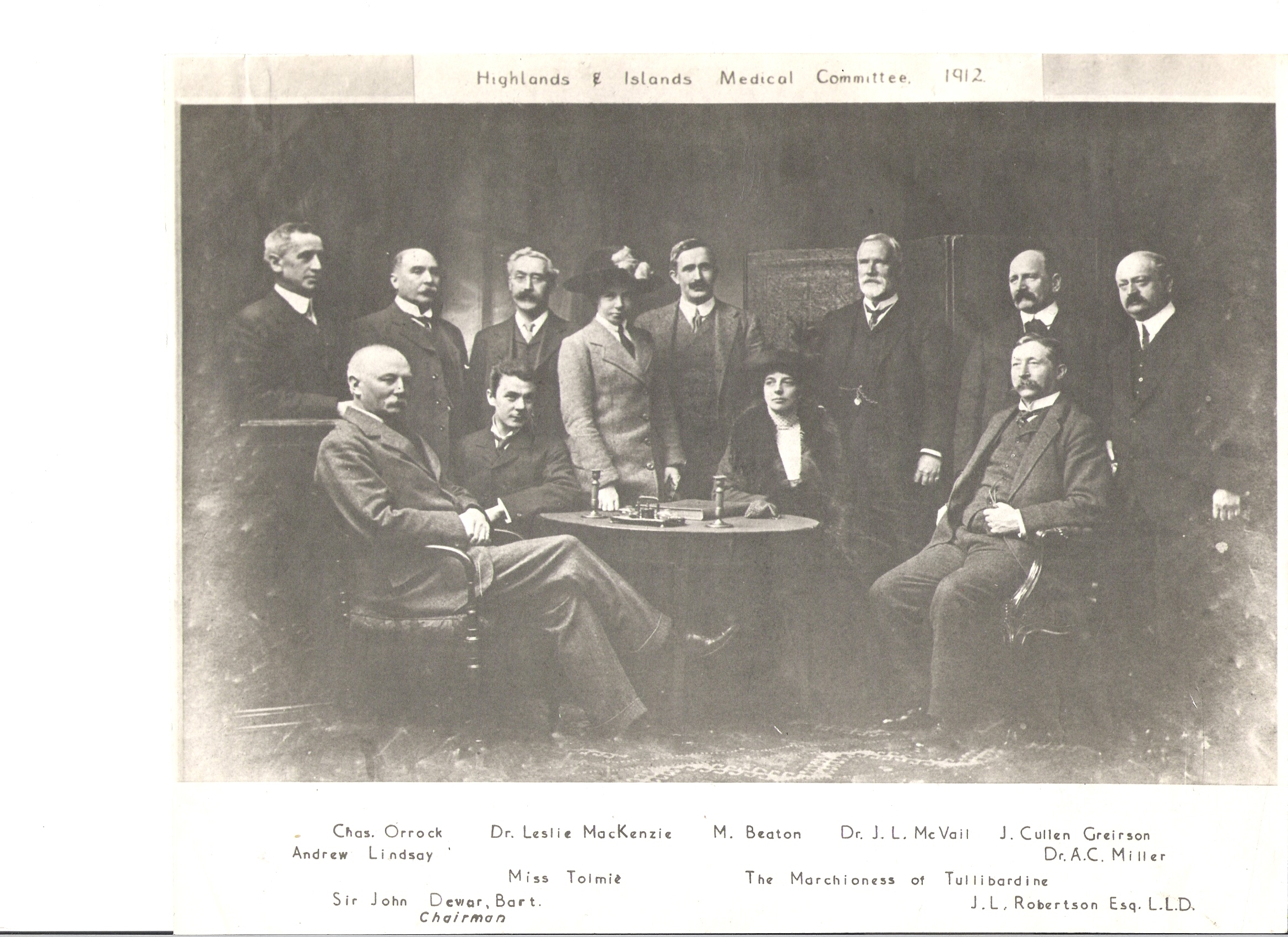

== Committee members ==
Chairman – Sir John Dewar

Secretary – Murdoch Beaton, an Inspector under the Health Insurance Commission. Born in 1869 the son of a fisherman from Ardelve, Lochalsh, Murdoch was educated at Aberdeen Grammar School and then Aberdeen University graduating with an MA. In the Minute of Appointment of the Committee Beaton was then an Inspector under the National Health Insurance Commission (Scotland). He rose to the rank of Lt.-Colonel in the Queens Own Cameron Highlanders during World War I and then continued as a civil servant in Inverness and latterly in Edinburgh where he died in 1948

J. Cullen Greirson, Esq., Convener of the County of Zetland

Andrew Lindsay, Esq., Convener of the County of Sutherland

Dr Leslie MacKenzie, Medical Member, Local Government Board of Scotland

Dr J. L. McVail, Deputy Chairman of the Scottish Insurance Commission. He began his professional career in 1873. He initially worked in general practice but became associated with public health when he began to assist the medical officer of health for Kilmarnock, whom he ultimately succeeded. He then became the first medical officer of health for the counties of Stirling and Dumbarton in 1891, a position he held for over twenty years. His painstaking investigations, his lucid reports, and his wisdom in counsel displayed during the period of his appointment placed him in the front rank of public health officers. His reputation as a far-sighted and impartial investigator was so well established that when, in 1907, the Royal Commission on the Poor Laws and Relief of Distress wanted to make inquiries into the methods of administering relief, Dr McVail was chosen to make those inquiries. Dr McVail's attention was turned to vaccination by the study of the mortality statistics of Kilmarnock for the years 1728 to 1764 which revealed appalling evidence of the great prevalence of smallpox among children in the eighteenth century. This led him to make an extensive study of vaccination; he collated the results in a book entitled Vaccination Vindicated, the first edition of which appeared in 1889. It was almost immediately regarded as the chief authority on the subject. His knowledge of the subject was so extensive that his evidence before the Royal Commission on Vaccination lasted twelve days. When the National Insurance Act 1911 came into force Dr McVail was appointed Deputy Chairman of the Scottish National Insurance Commission, a position he held until, on the abolition of the Commission and the creation of the Scottish Board of Health, he became the medical officer concerned with health insurance until his retirement in 1922. It was whilst serving in this role that he was appointed a member of the Dewar committee. He was also a member of the Astor Committee on Tuberculosis.

Dr A. C. Miller, Medical Officer for the Parishes of Kilmallie and Kilmonivaig – Dr Alexander Cameron Miller (1861–1927) was born on 12th Aug 1861 – to Allan Miller & Mary Taylor – and raised in Fort William. He spoke Gaelic. He graduated MBCM and MD from Edinburgh. He first practised in Banff, soon moving to Fort William, Inverness-shire. He was Consultant Physician to Inverness-shire Sanatorium, Surgeon at the old Belford Hospital (1864–1965) in Fort William, and on the Highlands and Islands Consultative Council of the Scottish Board of Health. He wrote a chapter of the book Scottish Mothers and Children by W Leslie Mackenzie (1917). He was Medical Officer and Vaccinator for Ardgour and Kingairloch, Fort William Burgh and Kilmallie District, parochial Medical Officer of Health for Kilmallie, Ardgour, and Kilmonivaig, medical referee under the Workmen's Compensation and Teachers' Superannuation Acts, Missouri to the Post Office, and certifying factory surgeon. In World War I, he chaired the district medical board. He was Fellow of the Royal Society of Edinburgh and of Soc. of Antiquaries of Scotland, justice of the peace and a freemason. He was medical superintendent at Belford Hospital for 41 years and was a former President of the Caledonian Medical Association. He died, unmarried, at Craiglinnhe, Fort William on 31st Dec 1927.

Charles Orrock, Esq., Chamberlain of the Lews, on the behalf of the owners, the Mathesons

Dr John L. Robertson, born in 1854, was Senior Chief Inspector of Schools for Scotland. Educated at the General Assembly School in Stornoway, and attended Edinburgh University without attending secondary school. He graduated as Master of Arts after three years and later Bachelor of Laws, joining the inspectorate of schools. In 1888 he was appointed as acting Chief Inspector of Schools, a position he later succeeded to fill. In 1912 he was given an Honorary LL.D. by Edinburgh University and in 1919 he was awarded a C.B. As well as the Dewar Committee he served on Lord Pentland's Committee for the employment of Highland boys and girls and on the Craik Commission on teachers' salaries. Sir Henry Craik, M.P. considered him to be 'a landmark in the educational history of Scotland'. When he died in Inverness, six years after his retirement from the post, his popularity was clear in the extent of the activity surrounding his funeral; when his body was returned to Lewis the flags on the island were at half mast and all businesses were closed at noon. All schools throughout Lewis were closed and 'the senior boys of Nicholson Institute headed the funeral procession, which included the Lewis Pipe Band, the Brethren of the Masonic Lodge, the Provost, Magistrates and Councillors of Stornoway and members and officials of all the other public bodies'. In addition, 'there was a very large and representative attendance of the general public, including people from all parts of the island'. Sir George Macdonald, the Secretary of the Scottish Education Department, extolled his virtues and said 'Few men in our time have laid their native country under so deep an obligation as he has done'.

Marchioness of Tullibardine
