= John Hugh Gillis =

Canadian long distance walker (1884–1913)

John Hugh Gillis (January 2, 1884 – July 4, 1913) was the first person to walk across Canada, and became Canadian all-round champion of track and field, now called the decathlon.

A physical director of the Vancouver police, Gillis was famous as the "Western Giant". At Winnipeg 1909 he became Canadian all-round champion. He set a shot put record that stood for 34 years. He was just 42 points short in 7,000 of winning the North American all-round. A member of the 1912 Olympic team, he hoped to compete with Jim Thorpe but he had to read about it from a tuberculosis sanitorium. He died at North Sydney on July 4, 1913 at age 29.

In May 2006, he was inducted into the British Columbia Sports Hall of Fame.

== History ==
John Hugh Gillis was the son of cabinet maker Angus Hugh Gillis and his wife, Margaret Ann MacFarlane, who had moved from the Margaree Valley to North Sydney. After she died in 1904 Angus married again and moved to Glace Bay. John Hugh attended St. Francis Xavier College but dropped out after a year or two.

== Cross-continent walk ==
On a bet and a dare, on January 31, 1906 at the age of 22 he set out from North Sydney, Nova Scotia, with two others to walk to San Francisco and back within a year. They hiked on the railroad track, crossed central Maine in cold and blizzard and reached Montreal, Quebec. There they disagreed. Gillis, suffering from sore feet, went on alone towards Vancouver, British Columbia. Charles Jackman, retired from the Toronto lacrosse team, decided at Montreal to follow him. Jackman caught up with him near Ignace, Ontario. The two tall athletes, both 6 feet 4½ inches, walked 1,800 miles (2,700 km) together with many adventures and strode into Vancouver station to a waiting crowd at midnight September 24, 1906.

=== Documentation ===
Jackman kept a little diary of the daily happenings and took 250 pictures. That diary, the pictures that survived, and the newspaper stories about the walk led to a book, Transcontinental Pedestrians, published in October 2006 by Fitzhenry & Whiteside, of Toronto.

== Track and field sports ==
When they came back from Victoria, Charles and John shook hands as Charles took the train for Halifax and home. They would never see each other again. John H Gillis decided to stay in Vancouver because there was great interest in track and field sports. At the 1907 meet there he won the 120-yard hurdles, the high jump and the shot put. The Vancouver Police Force, attracted by his athletic prowess, inducted him as a physical director. He and another athlete in the police force, Duncan Gillis, probably a distant cousin, lived at 852 Cordova Street.

=== Physical director of the Vancouver Police Force ===
In the Vancouver meet of May 23, 1908, John was first nationally with a shot put of 40 feet 7 inches.

From The Winnipeg Tribune July 19, 1909:

As was expected the Toronto team made a big cleanup but they were, nevertheless, given a great surprise by the two Vancouver policemen who toyed with the weights and jumps in a manner that had the Olympic stars beaten. D. Gillis took the hammer throw and the 56 lb. weight while J.H. Gillis secured the shot put, discus, high jump and hop, step and jump, besides a number of seconds and thirds. They will make great men for the next Olympic team, and they are practically sure of places in the big events.

In Toronto, the Globe of July 28, 1909, page 9, featured a photograph of John H. Gillis, the "giant Vancouver policeman, who won the all-round championship of Canada at the C.A.A.U. annual championship meet at Winnipeg.

From The Citizen, Ottawa July 29, 1909:

The two Gillis boys proved great attractions and soon became great favourites with the crowd, the splendid work of the British Columbia athletes evoking great enthusiasm. To John H. Gillis goes the gold medal for the all round championship. On the basis of three points for a first, two for a second, and one for a third, John Gillis won no less than 21 points. He took first in the hop step and jump, the 16 pound shot put, the 220 yards hurdles, throwing discus, and in the running long and the running high jumps. He was second in the standing broad jumps.

Gillis is tall and wiry, with long slim legs and a beautiful chest. He was graceful in every move despite his great height and in view of his gilt edged work at yesterday's meet it is no wonder that he landed the Canadian championship in Winnipeg. Duncan Gillis is also a strong acquisition in the field of Canadian amateur athletes. He was seen at his best in the heavyweight acts.

Five thousand spectators crowded the Scarborough Beach Athletic Grounds to watch the twenty-seventh meet held by the Toronto Police on Saturday, July 31, 1909. The Globe on page 3 the following Monday reported that J.H. Gillis, the Western giant, had won the gold medal with 20 points, had come first in five events and second in two, having placed in all events in which he had taken part. Duncan Gillis won ten points.

Four days later on August 4 at the Hamilton meet John Gillis came first in the running high jump, the running broad jump and the pole vault and second in the 100-yard race. Duncan was first in the 16-pound hammer throw, the caber tossing and the 16-pound long throw and second in the 56-pound high throw.

At Brockton Point July 28, 1910 John Gillis won the all-round contest and Duncan came first in the 56-pound throw, the discus and the 16-pound hammer.

The North American all-round championship for 1910 was fought out at Marshall Field in Chicago on August 13 in a seesaw battle between F.C Thomson of Los Angeles, the favourite, and J.H. Gillis. Their rivalry gripped the crowd of 3,500, for the result was very close. Thomson scored 6.951 points and Gillis 6,909—just 42 points short. The winner of the third spot gained 6,120 points. This was a remarkable accomplishment for an athlete who had neither a trainer nor an advisor in attendance. He had not enough strength in the 16-pound shot and the 56-pound weight: otherwise he would have come first.

Before a crowd of 4,500 at the Toronto Police athletic meet August 17, Gillis cleaned up with 21 points, the nearest competitor winning 9 points. The Toronto Daily Star of August 18, page 13, had a three-column montage of Gillis in action.

Another athlete and competitor in John's career was Martin Sheridan, who came from County Mayo to the United States in 1897, became a New York policeman, won nine Olympic medals and won three U.S all-round competitions, forerunners of the decathlon. In the first all-round between Gillis and Sheridan, Gillis won four events and Sheridan won six. In their second all-round, certified by Thomas Flanagan of the M.A.A.U, Sheridan won only two and Gillis won eight.

== Health issues ==
On September 17, 1910, John H Gillis suddenly resigned his position as first-class constable with a salary of $1,200. He was feeling vaguely unwell, losing weight, and was frequently tired.

Announcing the all-round championship The Daily World of August 5, 1911, sports page, mentioned "Vancouver's star athlete" and added, "John had intended to train early for this year's championship but later abandoned the intention." He went to work for Customs but had no longer the energy to go out socially. Gradually he grew worse: coughing, low fever, cold sweat at night, poor appetite, wasted appearance. On December 9, 1911 Dr, Kennedy admitted him to the sanitarium at Tranquille, near Kamloops.

== Recognition ==
The Sydney Record of July 5, front page, remembered that he had walked across the continent. The Sydney Daily Post of the same date, page 5, remarked, "He was looked on as the most likely aspirant for the honors so long held by Martin Sheridan, but the disease which ultimately brought about his death fastened upon him and cut short his athletic career."

The Daily News-Advertiser of Vancouver July 7, 1913 on its sports page carried the headline "John H Gillis Passes Away in Nova Scotia" and the sub-head "Former Vancouver Athlete Succumbs to Tuberculosis After Long Illness—Won Many Trophies on Athletic Field".

The deceased young man was Vancouver's most successful point winner at all championship meetings until 1911, when he retired....During his athletic career he won numerous trophies and was one of the most popular athletes in the country.

The Inland Sentinel of Kamloops July 5, 1913 had a long item about him on its front page:

Thousands of friends and admirers throughout the wide world will hear with regret of the death of John H. Gillis, prince of Canadian athletes, which occurred at his Cape Breton home this morning.

Gillis. . . was of herculean build, and had a brilliant career in the field of sport and his reputation was known in every quarter of the globe. Mr. Patk. Hartney roundly declares, indeed, that Gillies was the finest all round athlete Canada ever produced...

Mr. Gillis was a man of college education and while his exploits made him the admired of all admirers, he always remained a quiet unobtrusive and amiable gentleman, whose personal qualities retained for him the esteem which his prowess evoked.

=== British Columbia Sports Hall of Fame ===
John Gillis was inducted in the British Columbia Sports Hall of Fame in May, 2006, as a pioneer athlete.
