= Christian Gray (poet) =

Scottish poet in the early nineteenth century

- Born: 1772; Aberdalgie, Perthshire
- Died: 1830; Aberdalgie, Perthshire
- Writing career
- Language: English, Scots

Christian Gray (1772 – circa 1830) was a Scottish poet. Blind from a young age, Gray was known as the "blind poet" and wrote in both Scots and English. She published two volumes of poems in a variety of genres, including political, religious, and autobiographical.

== Biography ==
Christian Gray was born by April 1772 in Aberdalgie, Perthshire. Her family had been farmers for generations; she was the eldest of two children who survived to adulthood.

Gray lost her eyesight in childhood after falling ill with smallpox. She had passages of the Bible and poetry read to her often, and she knitted while walking in nature. Her neighbors provided assistance after her parents died, and she lived in a cottage provided by the Earl of Kinnoull.

Scottish historian Peter Robert Drummond visited Gray around 1827 and featured a chapter on her in Perthshire in Bygone Days: One Hundred Biographical Essays; he writes that she lived "a number of years" after his visit.

== Writing ==
Gray wrote in both Scots and English on a range of topics, including marriage, slavery, religion, war, and her own blindness. Some of her poems were written in response to well-known Scots songs. She composed poems in her head and recited them from memory until a visitor would write them down for her, often the schoolmaster of Aberdalgie. Her poem "The Victims of War," published in 1811, describes a doomed pair: Julia follows her lover Alexis to war, where he is shot and killed, and Julia endures hardships in her return to England. Another poem, "Bessy Bell and Mary Gray, a Legendary Tale," reflects on Gray's intellectual and literary growth.

=== Bibliography ===
- Tales, Letters, and Other Pieces in Verse, etc. Oliver & Boyd. 1808.
- A New Selection of Miscellaneous Pieces in Verse. Printed for the author, by R. Morison. 1821.
