= John Dewar Sr. =

Scottish businessman (1805-1880)

John Dewar Sr
- Born: 6 January 1805
- Died: 22 January 1880 (aged 75)
- Burial place: Wellshill Cemetery, Perth, Scotland
- Occupation: Whisky distiller
- Spouse: Jane Gow (m. 1845)
- Children: 8, including John, Arthur and Thomas

John Dewar (6 January 1805 – 22 January 1880), often referred to as John Dewar Sr, was a Scottish whisky distiller and businessman best known as the founder of the Scotch whisky firm John Dewar & Sons. Starting from a wine and spirits shop in Perth in the mid-19th century, he was among the first merchants to sell blended Scotch whisky in branded glass bottles, laying the foundations for the Dewar's blend that his sons later turned into an international brand.

== Early life ==
Dewar was born on 6 January 1805 in the village of Dull, near Aberfeldy in Perthshire, and grew up on a family farm. After serving an apprenticeship as a joiner, he moved in his early twenties to Perth, where he found work in his uncle's wine and spirits wholesaling firm. By 1837 he had become a partner in the business, gaining experience in buying and selling wines and spirits in the local and regional market.

== Wine and spirits business ==
In 1846 Dewar left the family wholesale partnership and established his own wine and spirits shop on Perth's High Street, trading under his own name. He was an early adopter of branding practices in Scotch whisky, selling his product in glass bottles bearing his name instead of the ceramic containers that were then common, which helped distinguish his whisky in a competitive market.

His son John Alexander Dewar joined the firm in 1871 and became a partner in 1879, shortly before his father's death.

== Personal life ==
In 1845, Dewar married Jane Gow, with whom he had 8 children, John (1849–1852), Agnes (1850–1852), James Gow (1852–1922), Alexander (1854–1855), John Alexander (1856–1929), Charles (1858–1933), Arthur (1860–1917), and Thomas Robert (1864–1930).

On his death, Thomas and John took over the management of the business.

== Death ==
Dewar died in 1880, aged 74. He was interred in Perth's Wellshill Cemetery. His wife survived him by twenty years and was buried beside him.
