= Frank Sullivan (medical doctor) =

Scottish medical doctor

Frank Sullivan FRSE FRCGP is a Scottish medical doctor who works as a general practitioner (GP) and who is a medical researcher. He is Director of Research at the School of Medicine at University of St Andrews. He was the first Gordon F. Cheesbrough Research Chair in Family and Community Medicine at North York General Hospital, Canada. He was the director of the Scottish School of Primary Care from 2007 to 2014.

== Education ==
He studied medicine at the University of Glasgow. He then completed a PhD in Health Services Research.

== Academic career ==
He has worked as a GP since 1984 when he joined a practice in Blantyre, South Lanarkshire. He was appointed to a lecturer's post at the Glasgow in 1985.

He took up a new chair in Primary Care Research and Development at the University of Dundee in 1998. He was appointed as the Director of the Scottish School of Primary Care in 2007. He took up the chair of the UK Heads of department of Primary Care in 2010. The following year he chaired the RCGP's Research Paper of the Year Award panel.

In February 2014 he was appointed as the first Gordon F. Cheesbrough Research Chair in Family and Community Medicine at North York General Hospital, which was the first position of its kind in Canada.

In 2015 he gave the James Mackenzie Lecture for the Royal College of General Practitioners.

== Published research ==
As of 2026, Sullivan's research output includes more than 350 published articles. In 2009 he was awarded "Research Paper of the Year" at the BMJ Group awards.

== Honours ==
In 2011, he was elected a Fellow of the Royal Society of Edinburgh.
