= Thomas Dewar, 1st Baron Dewar =

Scottish distiller and politician

The Right Honourable The Lord Dewar
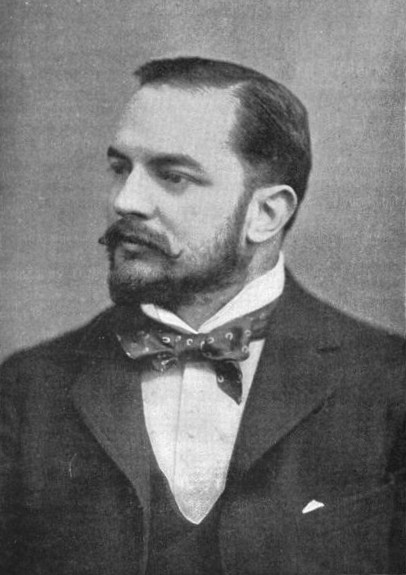
- Lord Dewar

Member of Parliament for St George, Tower Hamlets
- In office 1900–1906

Personal details
- Born: 6 January 1864 Perth, Scotland
- Died: 11 April 1930 (aged 66)
- Party: Conservative
- Parent: John Dewar, Sr. (father)
- Relatives: John Dewar (brother); Arthur Dewar (brother)
- Occupation: Businessman, whisky distiller

Thomas Robert Dewar, 1st Baron Dewar DL (6 January 1864 – 11 April 1930) was a Scottish whisky distiller who, along with his brother John Dewar, built their family company John Dewar & Sons into an international success. They blended their whisky to make it more appealing to the international palate and Dewar demonstrated particular skills in marketing, travelling the world to find new markets and promote his product, exploiting romantic images of Scotland and tartan in his advertising.

== Early life ==
Dewar was born in 1864 in Perth, Scotland. The son of John Dewar, Sr., he was exposed at a very young age to the spirit industry in Scotland as his father founded the John Dewar & Sons, Ltd. He earned his education in Perth, as well as in Edinburgh and he soon realised that farming was not his calling.

== Distillery ==
After his father's death Dewar worked with his brother John to continue and grow their family's brand. Gifted with a charisma, Dewar was able to expand his father's business on a global scale.

Leaving his brother in Scotland to run the business, Dewar set out to publicise their brand to the world. Visiting 26 countries over the course of two years, the Dewar's brand was put on the map as one of the premier Scotch whiskies available. Dewar kept a journal of his travels which were consolidated and published in the book titled, Ramble Round the Globe, published by Chatto and Windus in 1894. In 1923 Dewar purchased the Glen Ord Distillery and two years later the Dewar brothers took their company to join TheDistillers Company Ltd, both joining the board.

He is noted as a long-term resident at the Savoy Hotel in London.

== Political career ==
Dewar was a justice of the peace for Kent and a Lieutenant of the City of London, Sheriff of London in 1897, and then entered politics as the unsuccessful Conservative candidate at the Walthamstow by-election in 1897.

At the general election in October 1900 he was elected as the Member of Parliament for Tower Hamlets, St George, holding the seat until he stood down in 1906.

During this period, Dewar was noted for his hostility to "pauper immigration" and played an active part in campaigning for the legislation that became the Aliens Act 1905.

== Honours and arms ==
Dewar was included as a Knight Bachelor in the 1902 Coronation Honours List of King Edward VII, and was knighted by the King at Buckingham Palace on 18 December 1902. He was created a baronet, of Homestall Manor in the Parish of East Grinstead in the County of East Sussex, in the 1917 King's Birthday Honours List, and raised to the peerage as Baron Dewar, of Homestall in the County of Sussex, in 1919. However, as he never married the baronetcy and barony became extinct on his death, at Homestall, in April 1930, aged sixty-six, following which he was cremated at Golders Green Crematorium.

Coat of arms of Thomas Dewar, 1st Baron Dewar
| Crest Between two thistles leaved and slipped proper, a cock gules armed and spurred argent, and charged on the breast with cinquefoil or. Escutcheon Per saltire or and azure, a seax erect proper, surmounted by a saltire engrailed per saltire of the second and first between two cinquefoils in fesse also of the first. Supporters On a compartment of grass semée of thistles proper, on the dexter side a goat sable, and on the sinister side a greyhound proper, collared gules. Motto Gloria patri (Glory to the father) |

== Sporting interests ==
=== Horseracing ===
Thomas Dewar became involved in Thoroughbred horse racing as an owner and breeder. He is best known for two significant horses: Challenger and Cameronian.

Challenger, foaled 1927, whom Dewar bred and raced at age two but who then was sold to American interests after his death. The stallion went on to become the Leading sire in North America in 1939. Bred by Dewar and foaled in 1928, Cameronian won the 1931 Epsom Derby and 2,000 Guineas Stakes.

=== Sports prizes ===
Dewar created several Challenge Shields for various sports around the United Kingdom and abroad, as well as the Sheriff of London Charity Shield and the Dewar Cup Trophy in the United States for Association football.

For cycling he donated the Dewar Challenge Shield in 1901, a heavily embossed silver plaque depicting goddesses and allusions to Scotland to include thistles and a profile of a racing cyclist centrally mounted. It is inscribed "Theatrical Sports Five Miles Cycling Championship Shield" — "Presented by Sir Thomas Dewar MP — To be won Three Years in Succession". Mounted on a shaped wooden mount, it possesses 14 silver name plaques of winners between 1901 and 1928. The Lord Dewar Challenge Cup was also presented to the Serpentine Swimming Club in Hyde Park in 1925.

For shooting, Dewar presented a trophy for international Smallbore rifle competition as a Postal Match. The Dewar Match is a distributed shooting event held in various locations with the results mailed in to determine an aggregate winner. Dewar's marksmanship trophy is a large silver cup standing over two feet tall with two oversized handles and ornately decorated to the Society of Miniature Rifle Clubs (SMRC) of Great Britain. Engraved upon it, "International Post Trophy Match, Presented by Sir Thomas R. Dewar, Afterwards Lord Dewar, to the Society of Miniature Rifle Clubs For Annual Competition".

== Legacy ==
A Dewar Challenge Shield, donated by Dewar's granddaughter Alice Dewar, is competed for annually by three rowing clubs in Hammersmith, West London: Furnivall Sculling Club, Sons of the Thames and Auriol Kensington Rowing Club.

== See also ==
- The Dewarists

Parliament of the United Kingdom
| Preceded by Harry Marks | Member of Parliament for St George, Tower Hamlets; 1900–1906 | Succeeded by William Wedgwood Benn |
Peerage of the United Kingdom
| New creation | Baron Dewar; 1919–1930 | Extinct |
Baronetage of the United Kingdom
| New creation | Baronet (of Homestall Manor); 1917–1930 | Extinct |
