= Edinburgh South by-election =

Edinburgh South by-election may refer to:

- 1886 Edinburgh South by-elections
- 1899 Edinburgh South by-election
- 1909 Edinburgh South by-election
- 1910 Edinburgh South by-election
- 1917 Edinburgh South by-election
- 1920 Edinburgh South by-election
- 1957 Edinburgh South by-election
