= Minister of State for Creative Industries, Media and Online Safety =

British government position

United Kingdom Minister of State for Creative Industries, Media and Online Safety
- Royal Arms of His Majesty's Government

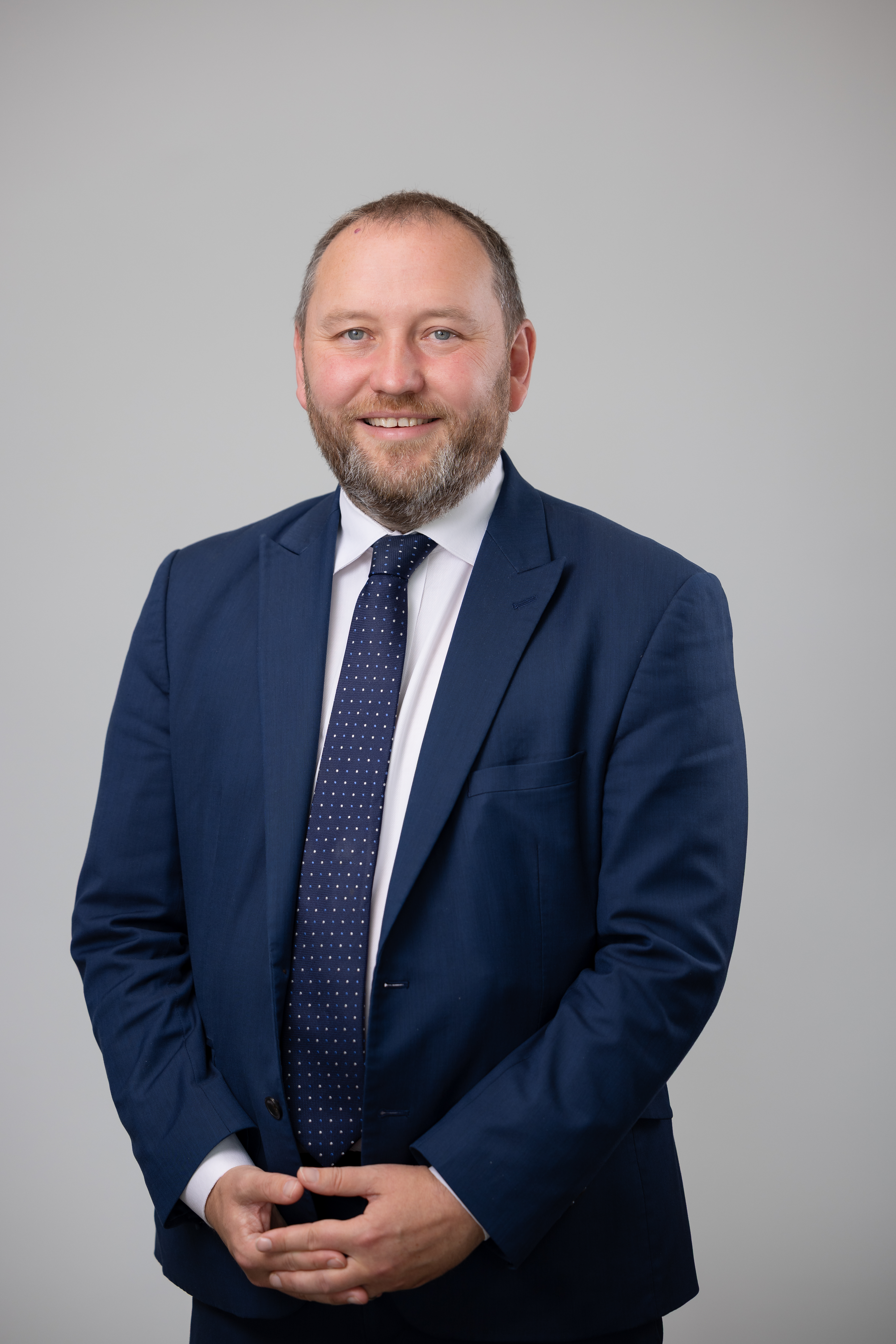
- Incumbent; Ian Murray since 6 September 2025
- Department for Digital, Culture, Media and Sport
- Style: Minister of State
- Nominator: Prime Minister
- Appointer: The Monarch (on the advice of the Prime Minister)
- Term length: At His Majesty's pleasure
- Formation: 8 July 2024
- Website: www.gov.uk/government/ministers/minister-of-state--210

The Minister of State for Creative Industries, Media and Online Safety is a mid-level position in the Department for Digital, Culture, Media and Sport in the British Government.

The role is currently held by Ian Murray; it was previously held by Chris Bryant, Julia Lopez, John Whittingdale and Matt Warman respectively.

Between 7 March 2023 and 20 July 2026, the officeholder concurrently held a ministerial role in the Department for Science, Innovation and Technology, covering the portfolio of Digital and Data.

== Responsibilities ==
The minister has responsibility of the following policy areas:

- Arts
- Creative Industries
- Media
- Cultural Diplomacy and Soft Power
- Gambling, Heritage, Libraries and Museums (in the Commons)

== List of ministers ==
| Minister | Took office | Left office | Political party | Ministry |
Minister of State for Media and Data
| John Whittingdale; MP for Maldon | 14 February 2020 | 10 September 2021 | Conservative | Johnson (II) |
Minister of State for Media, Data, and Digital Infrastructure
| Julia Lopez; MP for Hornchurch and Upminster | 16 September 2021 | 6 July 2022 | Conservative | Johnson (II) |
Minister of State for Digital, Culture, Media and Sport
| Matt Warman; MP for Boston and Skegness | 7 July 2022 | 7 September 2022 | Conservative | Johnson (II) |
Minister of State for Media, Data, and Digital Infrastructure
| Julia Lopez; MP for Hornchurch and Upminster | 7 September 2022 | 7 February 2023 | Conservative | Truss |
| Julia Lopez; MP for Hornchurch and Upminster | 7 September 2022 | 7 February 2023 | Conservative | Sunak |
Minister of State for Media, Tourism and Creative Industries also Minister of State for Data and Digital Infrastructure in the Department for Science, Innovation and Technology from March 2023
| Julia Lopez; MP for Hornchurch and Upminster | 7 February 2023 | 9 May 2023 | Conservative | Sunak |
| John Whittingdale (Note: In accordance with the Ministerial and other Maternity Allowances Act 2021, Whittingdale temporarily served during Lopez's maternity leave.); MP for Maldon | 9 May 2023 | 20 December 2023 | Conservative | Sunak |
| Julia Lopez; MP for Hornchurch and Upminster | 20 December 2023 | 5 July 2024 | Conservative | Sunak |
Minister of State for Creative Industries, Arts and Tourism also Minister of State for Data Protection and Telecoms in the Department for Science, Innovation and Technology
| Chris Bryant; MP for Rhondda and Ogmore | 8 July 2024 | 6 September 2025 | Labour | Starmer |
Minister of State for Creative Industries, Media and Arts also Minister of State for Digital Government and Data in the Department for Science, Innovation and Technology until July 2026
| Ian Murray; MP for Edinburgh South | 6 September 2025 | 20 July 2026 | Labour | Starmer |
Minister of State for Creative Industries, Media and Online Safety
| Ian Murray; MP for Edinburgh South | 21 July 2026 | Incumbent | Labour | Burnham |
