= 1910 Edinburgh South by-election =

UK parliamentary by-election

- 29 April 1910

Candidate	Lyell	Glyn
Party	Liberal	Conservative
Popular vote	8,694	6,367
Percentage	57.7%	42.3%
MP before election
Arthur Dewar
Liberal
Subsequent MP
Charles Henry Lyell
Liberal

The 1910 Edinburgh South by-election was a parliamentary by-election held for the UK House of Commons constituency of Edinburgh South in Scotland on 29 April 1910.

== Vacancy ==
The by-election was caused by the appointment of the sitting Liberal MP, Arthur Dewar KC, who was the Solicitor General for Scotland, as a Senator of the College of Justice.

== Electoral history ==
Dewar had first been elected as MP for Edinburgh South in a by-election in June 1899. He lost the seat narrowly at the general election of 1900 but won it back in 1906, holding it in January 1910.

General election January 1910: Edinburgh South
Party	Candidate	Votes	%	±%
Liberal	Arthur Dewar	10,235	56.4	−7.4
Conservative	Harold B Cox	7,901	43.6	+7.4
Majority		2,334	12.8	−14.8
Turnout		18,136	88.8	+5.4
Liberal hold		Swing	-7.4	

== Candidates ==
The Liberals first choice for the seat was Dr Edward Parrott. Parrott, a publisher and author, was chairman of the Edinburgh South Liberal Association and also of the Edinburgh United Liberal Committee. At a meeting on 11 April, the local executive of the Liberal Association met to consider who the candidate should be, assuming Dewar was to be appointed to the College of Justice. Parrott asked for 48 hours to think the offer over but turned it down and the committee instead turned to Charles Lyell a 34-year-old professional politician, as their preferred candidate. Lyell had been MP for East Dorset from 1904 to January 1910. During that time he served as Parliamentary Private Secretary to Sir Edward Grey, the Foreign Secretary. He switched seats in January 1910, leaving the marginal East Dorset to Freddie Guest (Guest had family connections in the county) and taking on instead the usually Unionist seat of Edinburgh West, which he failed to gain.

The Unionist candidate in the previous general election had been Harold Cox, an Edinburgh businessman but he ruled himself out as a possible candidate for the by-election on medical advice. The Unionists then turned to 25-year-old Ralph Campbell Glyn, the only son of the Bishop of Peterborough whose mother was the sister of the Duke of Argyll. Glyn had been the Liberal Unionist candidate in Elginshire and Nairnshire at the January 1910 election.

== Campaign ==
An early issue in the campaign was the question of House of Lords reform. This had been brought to a head by Lloyd George's People's Budget of 1909. Lloyd George's radical tax raising proposals and plans to finance social provisions such as old age pensions meant his budget was rejected by the landed majority in the House of Lords against the convention that the Lords would not reject financial bills. This sparked a constitutional crisis and provoked the January 1910 general election. The issue was therefore still high on the political agenda and Glyn made it the centrepiece of his adoption meeting on 20 April. He said he was in favour of reforming the House of Lords but could not bring himself to attack its recent actions. He said the best party to reform the Lords was what he described as the Constitutional party i.e. the Conservatives. Constitutional reform should not be rushed and the Tories said Glyn were the best placed to consider this matter as they may have been slow but had always been sure. This position was reinforced by the letter of support which Glyn received from the Conservative leader Arthur Balfour. In it, Balfour wrote that the present government desired a revolution, not he said against the House of Lords, but against the British people. In his letter Balfour contended that there were many evils associated with the reform of the Lords, including the postponement of the very social reforms which the Liberal government wished to implement. It is not in an atmosphere of revolutionary controversy, he wrote, that healthy legislation on such subjects can be secured.

Asquith's letter of support to Lyell was less colourful simply referring to the great constitutional struggle which the country and the party was engaged in and anticipating another clear Liberal win in the constituency.

== Result ==
Lyell held the seat for the Liberals with a majority of 2,327 votes over Glyn. This compared with an almost identical majority of 2,334 at the previous general election.

Edinburgh South by-election, 1910
Party	Candidate	Votes	%	±%
Liberal	Charles Henry Lyell	8,694	57.7	+1.3
Liberal Unionist	Ralph Glyn	6,367	42.3	−1.3
Majority		2,327	15.4	+2.6
Turnout		15,061	73.7	−15.1
Liberal hold		Swing	+1.3	

While turnout was down between the general election and by-election, the share of the poll each party received was broadly the same. It seems issues the electorate felt were important enough to vote for in January had not changed by April and neither did the Liberals suffer from voter impatience at being asked to turn out for what may have seemed like an unnecessary election, as sometimes happens when sitting MPs stand down close to general elections.

== Aftermath ==
The Liberal held the seat at the following General election.

General election December 1910: Edinburgh South
Party	Candidate	Votes	%	±%
Liberal	Charles Henry Lyell	9,576	54.5	−1.9
Conservative	Charles Murray	7,986	45.5	−1.9
Majority		1,590	9.0	−3.8
Turnout		17,562	84.2	−4.6
Liberal hold		Swing	-1.9	

Glyn was elected MP for Clackmannan and Eastern Stirlingshire in 1918.

== See also ==
- Lists of United Kingdom by-elections
- United Kingdom by-election records
- February 1886 Edinburgh South by-election
- 1899 Edinburgh South by-election
- 1917 Edinburgh South by-election
- 1957 Edinburgh South by-election
