= Andrew Wauchope =

British Army officer

Major-General Andrew Wauchope CB CMG
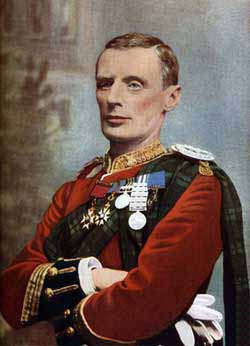
- Born: 5 July 1846; Niddrie Marischal, Scotland
- Died: 11 December 1899 (aged 53); Magersfontein, Cape Colony
- Burial place: Matjiesfontein cemetery
- Spouse(s): Elythea Ruth Erskine (first wife); Jane Muir (second wife)
- Military career
- Allegiance: United Kingdom
- Branch: British Army
- Rank: Major-General
- Unit: Black Watch
- Commands: 3rd (Highland) Brigade
- Conflicts: Battle of El Teb; Battle of Kirbekan; Battle of Belmont; Battle of Modder River; Battle of Magersfontein †
- Awards: CB; CMG

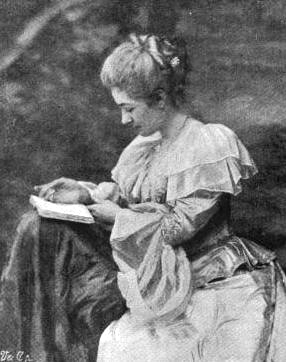
His second wife, Jane Wauchope, survived him

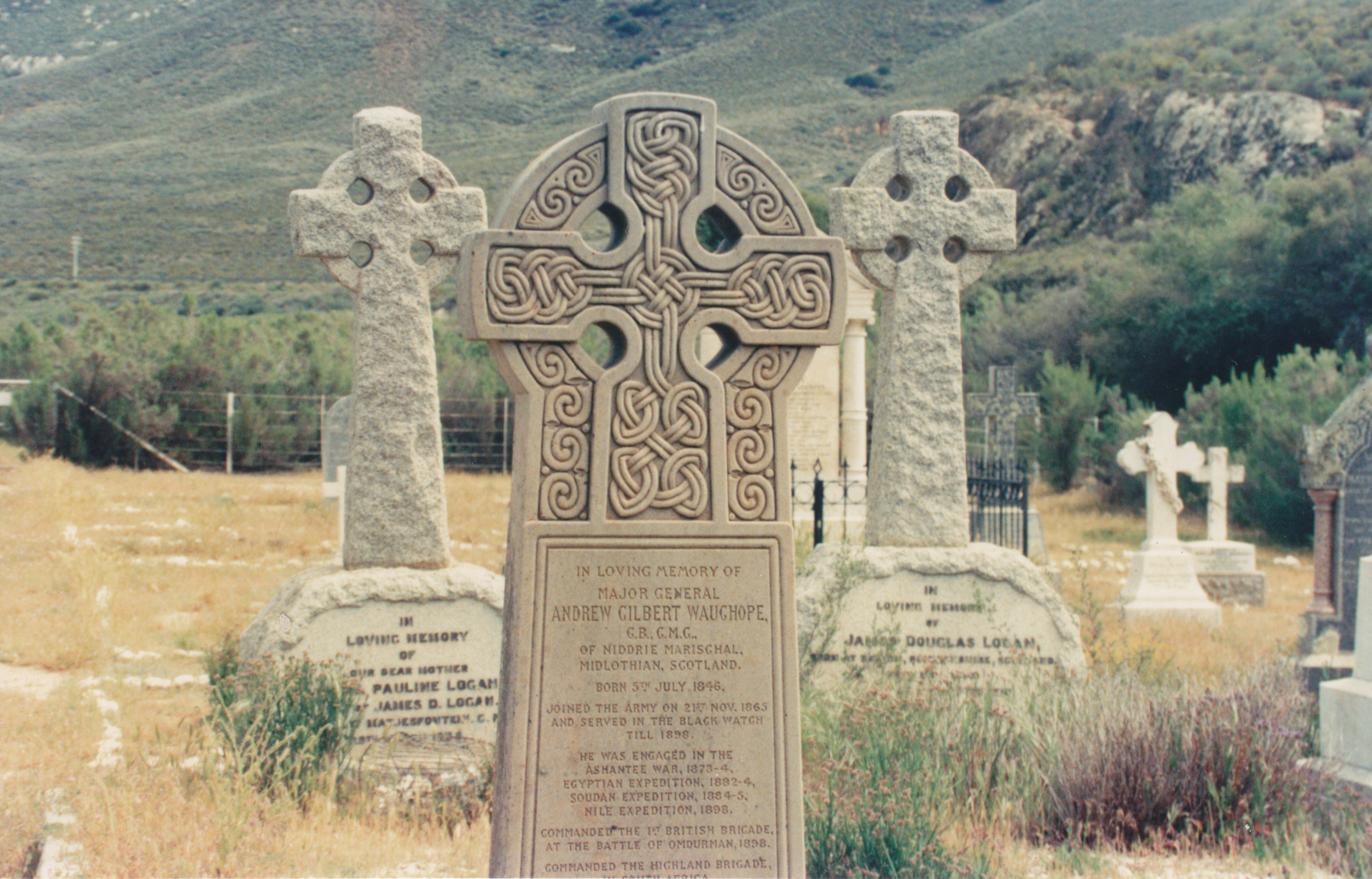
Wauchope's grave, Matjiesfontein

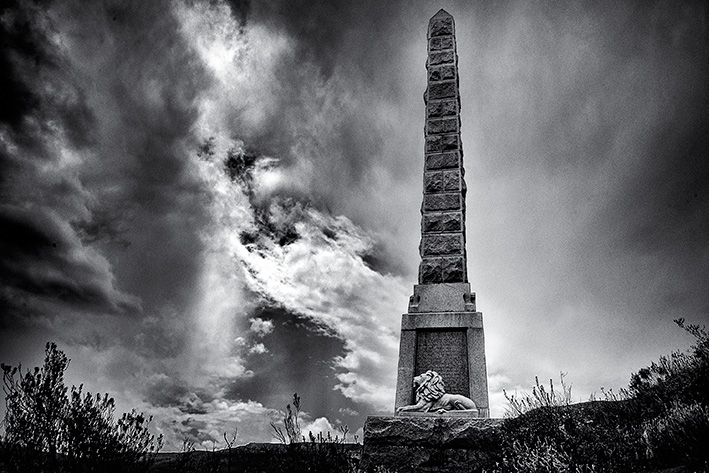
Memorial to Andrew Gilbert Wauchope at Memorial Cemetery, outside Matjiesfontein

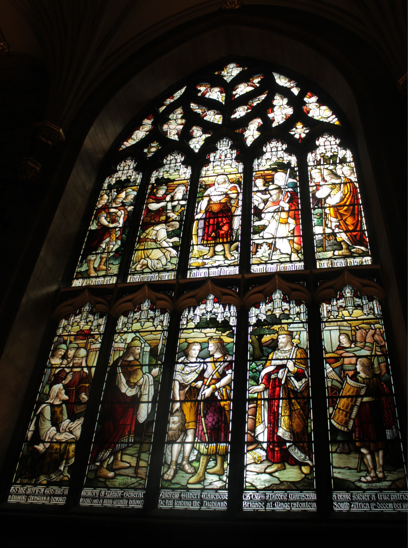
Memorial window to Andrew Gilbert Wauchope, St Giles' Cathedral

Major-General Andrew Gilbert Wauchope CB CMG (5 July 1846 – 11 December 1899) was a British Army officer who was killed while commanding a brigade at the Battle of Magersfontein during the Second Boer War.

== Biography ==
=== Early life ===
Andrew Gilbert Wauchope was the second son of Andrew Wauchope of Niddrie Marischal House, located just southeast of Edinburgh in Midlothian, Scotland, and Frances-Mary (née Lloyd), the daughter of Henry Lloyd, Esq., of County Tipperary, Ireland. He received his early education at Stubbington House School and, in 1859, was sent to HMS Britannia to train as a naval cadet. The following year, he was posted as a midshipman to St George. Unhappy with naval life, he obtained his discharge from the Navy on 3 July 1862, shortly before his eighteenth birthday.

=== Army career 1865-1873 ===
He resolved to enter the Army and purchased a second lieutenant's commission in the Black Watch in 1865. He was promoted to lieutenant in 1867 and served as an adjutant from 1870 to 1873. In 1873, he participated in the Second Anglo-Ashanti War, serving on special duty with a Hausa regiment. During this conflict, he was twice wounded and mentioned in despatches.

=== Cyprus 1878-1880 ===
In July 1878, the United Kingdom took control of Cyprus as a result of the Cyprus Convention, and Wauchope was appointed governor of the Paphos region. He returned to England in August 1880. He was promoted to captain in 1878 and was made a Companion of the Order of St Michael and St George (CMG) in 1880.

=== Transvaal and Egypt 1881-1885 ===
He served on the staff during the Transvaal War in 1881 and with his regiment in the 1882 Anglo-Egyptian War. That year, he married his first wife, Elythea Ruth Erskine; she died in childbirth in 1884, leaving him with twin sons. He fought in the Mahdist War in 1884, where he was severely wounded at the Battle of El Teb on 29 February and mentioned in despatches. He was promoted to major in March and received a brevet lieutenant-colonelcy in May. He then served on the Nile Expedition, where he was again severely wounded at the Battle of Kirbekan in February 1885.

=== Scotland ===
Following the expedition, he returned to Scotland to manage his family estates at Niddrie and Yetholm, which he had recently inherited. The coal mines at Niddrie were highly productive, and as a result, he became one of the richest men in Scotland. In 1893, he married his second wife, Jean Muir, the daughter of William Muir. She became the only woman residing at Edinburgh Castle, where her husband commanded the Black Watch. They had no children, and she survived him.

=== Politician 1892-1899 ===
A staunch Conservative, he was politically active and opposed Gladstone for the constituency of Midlothian in the 1892 election. Although he did not win, he reduced Gladstone's majority by over 80%. He opposed the coal strike of 1894 and the proposed eight-hour work limits for miners but was generally recognized by his workers as a generous employer; during the coal strike, he supported the families of the strikers. He again ran for Parliament at the 1899 Edinburgh South by-election in Edinburgh South in June 1899, losing to Arthur Dewar. At the local level, he was an elder of Liberton Kirk, a member of the local school board, the parish council, and the General Assembly of the Church of Scotland.

=== Sudan 1898 ===
He was promoted to colonel in 1888, made a Companion of the Order of the Bath (CB) in 1889, and given command of the 2nd Battalion of the Black Watch in 1894. In 1898, he commanded a brigade during the reconquest of Sudan, seeing action at the Battle of Atbara and the Battle of Omdurman. As a result of his service, he was promoted to major-general that same year.

=== Boer War 1899 ===
He was appointed to command the 3rd (Highland) Brigade in the South African War, which saw action at the Battle of Belmont and the Battle of Modder River as part of the force sent to relieve the Siege of Kimberley. Pushing further, they again encountered Boer forces at Magersfontein.

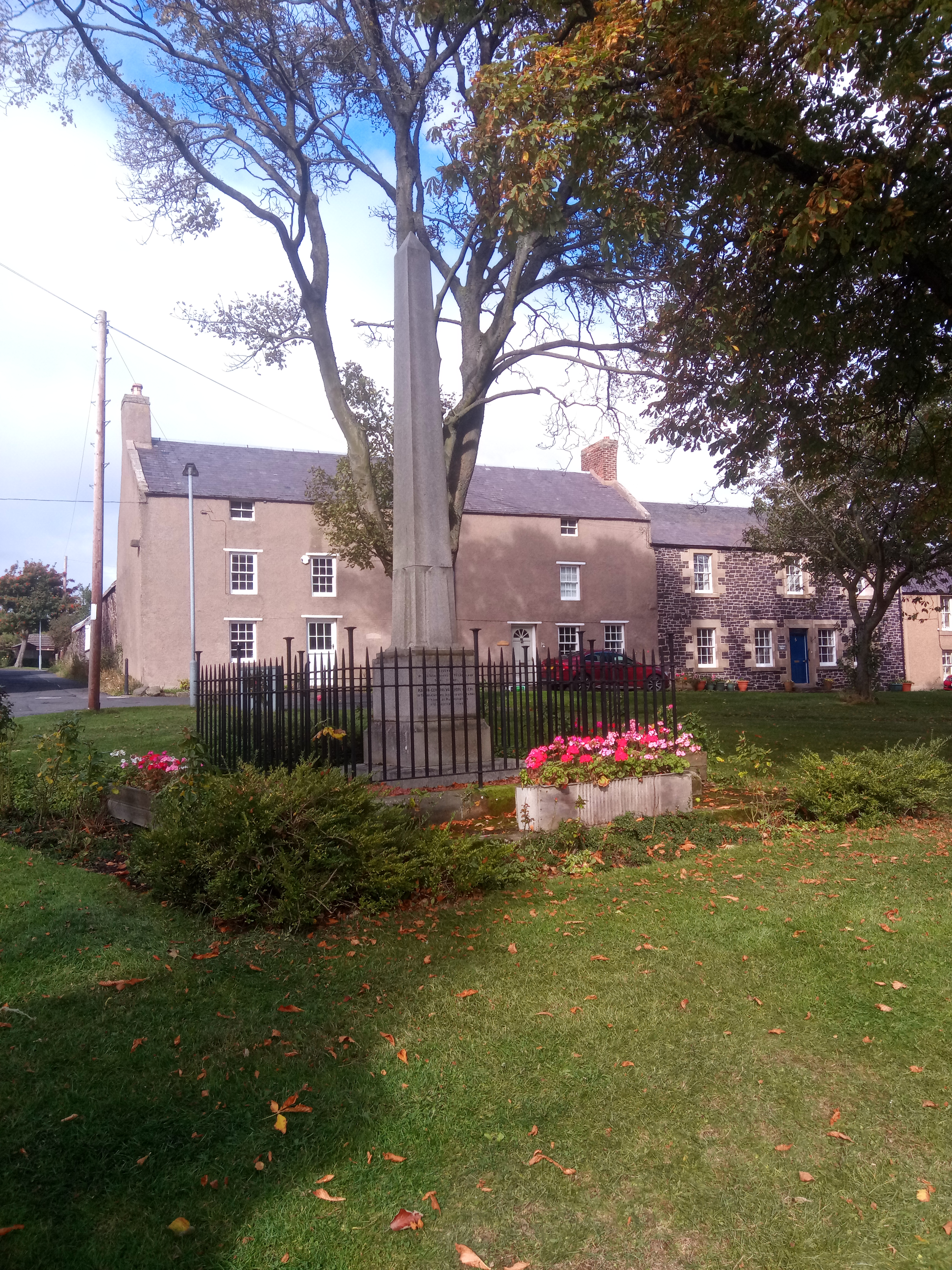
The Wauchope memorial in the centre of Town Yetholm

In the ensuing Battle of Magersfontein on 11 December 1899, the Highland Brigade was ordered to make a dawn attack on the Boer defenses. However, the force was spotted before it was prepared to attack, and faulty reconnaissance meant that the enemy positions were not properly located. The column came under heavy fire as it struggled to deploy for action. Wauchope was killed by rifle fire in the opening minutes of combat; the brigade was pinned down and went to ground. After Wauchope's death, the brigade was leaderless, and no one assumed command until late in the afternoon. Despite the support of the Guards Brigade, the brigade was routed in the early afternoon.

Wauchope's dying words are a subject of some dispute. Douglas' biography quotes them as "Don't blame me for this, lads." However, Arthur Conan Doyle wrote:

Rumour has placed words of reproach upon his dying lips, but his nature, both gentle and soldierly, forbids the supposition. "What a pity!" was the only utterance which a brother Highlander ascribes to him.

== Memorials ==
After Wauchope's death, a stained glass window was donated by the people of Liberton Kirk. The window is located just a few feet from where Wauchope always sat in the East Gallery. To date, this is the only stained glass window in the church. Another memorial, a granite obelisk, was erected in Yetholm, near his Roxburghshire estate, in September 1902.

He was also the subject of at least one poem, Wauchope! (To the memory of a gallant officer.) (1900), by Scottish Border poet and Australian bush balladeer Will H. Ogilvie (1869–1963), who had also grown up near the Yetholm area.

A significant stained glass window was also erected in St Giles' Cathedral in central Edinburgh. The window is located in the south-west portion of the church.

His wife, Jean, arranged for the creation of Wauchope Hall in Town Yetholm, which was opened in 1919. The hall was a conversion from a former church.

== Sources ==
- Carlyle, Edward Irving (1901). "Wauchope, Andrew Gilbert" . In Lee, Sidney (ed.). Dictionary of National Biography (1st supplement). London: Smith, Elder & Co.
- E. I. Carlyle, rev. Roger T. Stearn (2004). "Wauchope, Andrew Gilbert (1846–1899)". Oxford Dictionary of National Biography. Oxford Dictionary of National Biography (online ed.). Oxford University Press. doi:10.1093/ref:odnb/28897. (Subscription, Wikipedia Library access or UK public library membership required.)
