= Robert Cox (Scottish politician) =

Scottish gelatine and glue manufacturer and Liberal Unionist politician (1845 – 1899)

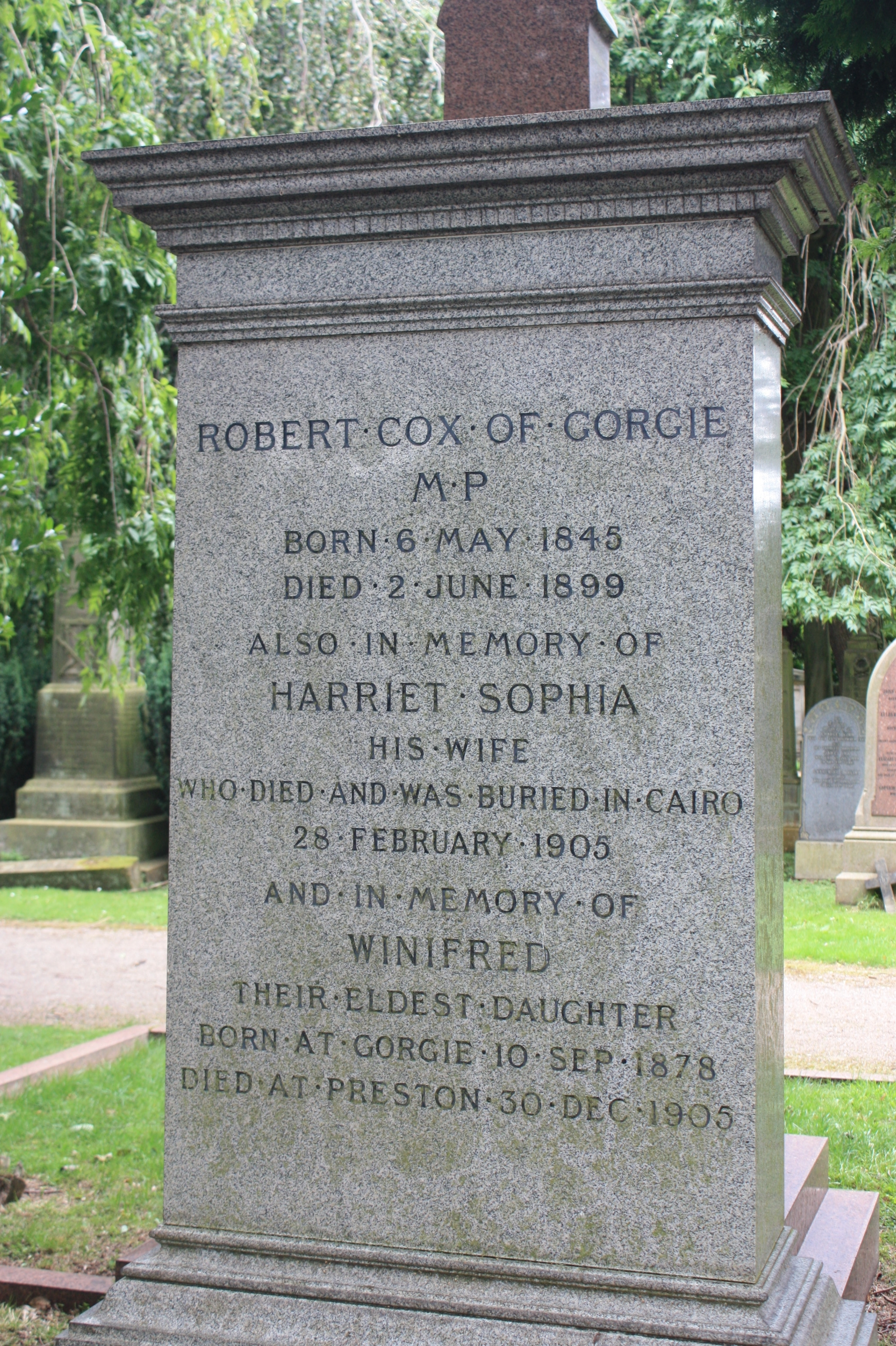
grave of Robert Cox MP, Dean Cemetery

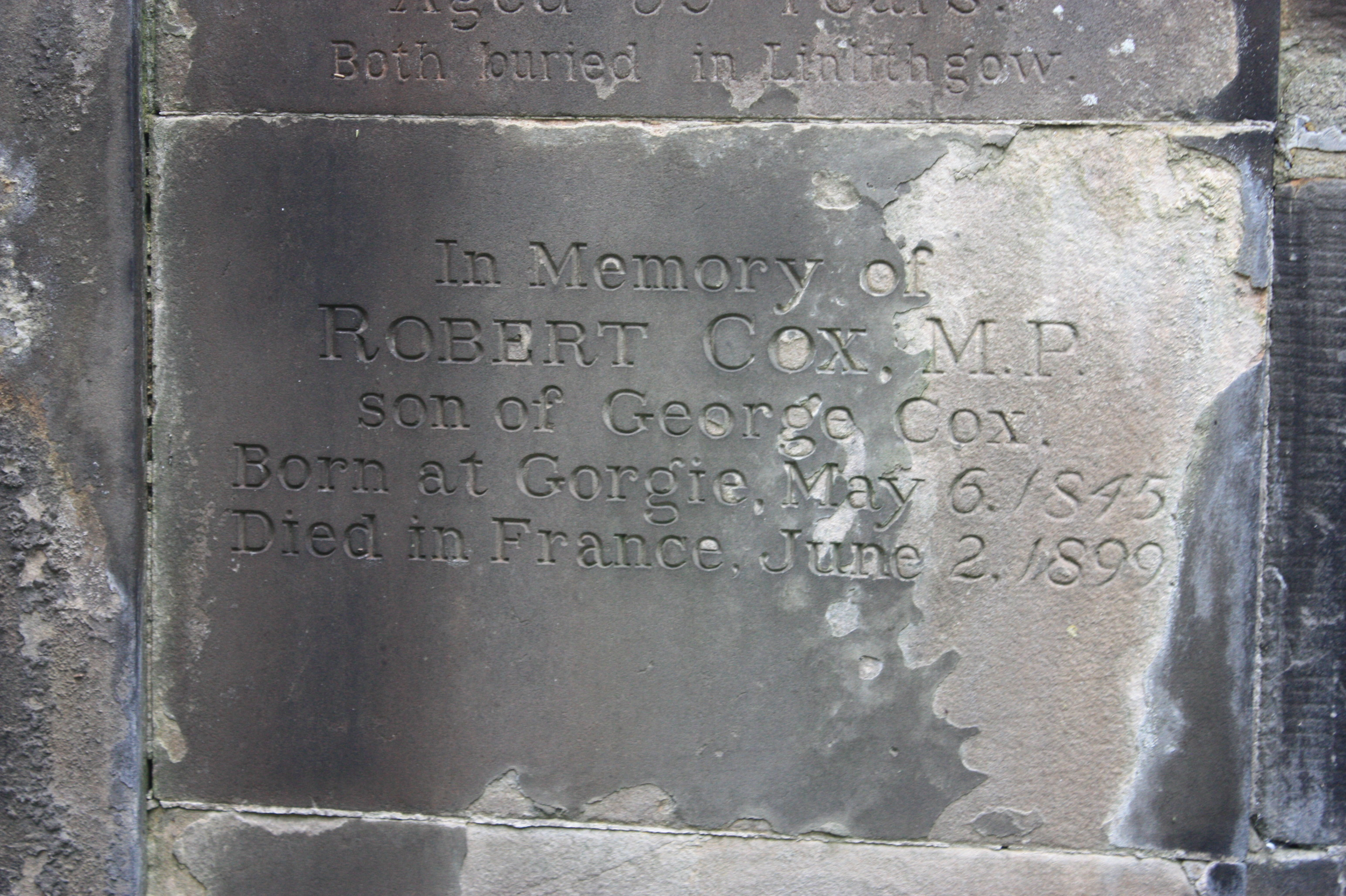
Memorial to Robert Cox MP, St Cuthbert's Churchyard, Edinburgh

Robert J. Cox FRSE (6 May 1845 – 2 June 1899) was a Scottish gelatine and glue manufacturer and Liberal Unionist politician.

== Family and education ==
Cox was the son of George Cox of Gorgie, a district of Edinburgh and his wife Isabella (née Craig), the daughter of Robert Craig, a surgeon from Peebles. He was educated at Loretto School, the University of St Andrews and the University of Edinburgh. In 1875, he married Harriet Sophia Bennett (1850-1905), the daughter of the eminent physician and physiologist Professor John Hughes Bennett of the Institute of Medicine at the University of Edinburgh. They had 6 children, Harold, Douglas, Rosalind, Winafried, Mina, Robert Ferdinand De Lesseps (composer and musician, who died in 1952).

== Career ==
From 1874, Cox was the sole partner of J & G Cox, Ltd gelatine and glue manufacturers of Edinburgh. He was later Chairman of the Madelvic Motor Carriage Company Ltd of Granton.

In 1885 he was living at 34 Drumsheugh Gardens in Edinburgh's West End.

== Politics ==
Cox took an interest in local politics. At one time or another he sat as a member of the Mid Lothian County Council, Edinburgh Parish Council (of which he was Chairman of the Landward Committee), Edinburgh Town Council and the School Board.

Cox first stood for Parliament at a by-election in the Kirkcaldy Burghs constituency on 11 March 1892. Cox was selected as the Unionist candidate for the seat, which had become vacant on the death of the sitting Liberal MP, Sir George Campbell. However Cox was unsuccessful, the seat being held for the Liberals by a majority of 1,036 votes, by J H Dalziel, a journalist and later newspaper proprietor.

Cox did not contest the 1892 general election but in June 1895 the Unionist Association of the East Edinburgh division approached him as a possible candidate. The Liberal MP for the seat, Robert Wallace was reported to have fallen foul of his local Liberal Association on the issue of Irish Home Rule and they had selected a Mr J Martin White to fight the seat instead. It was thought possible that Wallace would stand as an independent and create a three-cornered contest. In the end Wallace and the East Edinburgh Liberals must have mended their fences as Wallace stood again as a Liberal at the 1895 general election and White successfully contested Forfarshire in the Liberal interest.

Cox declined the offer to stand in Edinburgh East (or it was withdrawn) and instead was adopted as Liberal Unionist candidate for the Edinburgh South division. He narrowly defeated the sitting Liberal MP, Herbert Paul, turning a Liberal majority of 431 into a Unionist one of just 97.

== Other appointments and interests ==
Cox served as a Justice of the Peace for Mid Lothian and was sometime Deputy Lieutenant for the County of Edinburgh. He also served as President of the Scottish Rights of Way Association. Cox had a wide range of intellectual interests. He was particularly concerned with philosophy and astronomy. He was a Fellow of the Royal Society of Edinburgh, a Fellow of the Royal Scottish Society of Arts and Vice-President of the Edinburgh Philosophical Institution. He employed William Peck to run a private observatory at Murrayfield and later donated his telescopes to the City Observatory on Calton Hill. In 1899, Cox was elected a Fellow of the Society of Antiquaries of Scotland. Cox was also a member of the Royal Company of Archers, the ceremonial unit that served as the Sovereign's Bodyguard in Scotland.

== Death ==
Cox was in poor health towards the end of his life. He died at Aix-les-Bains on 2 June 1899, aged 54.

He is buried in Dean Cemetery in Edinburgh, in its north-east section not far from the entrance. He is also memorialised on his parents' grave in St Cuthbert's churchyard in the city centre.

Parliament of the United Kingdom
Preceded by Herbert Paul	Member of Parliament for Edinburgh South; 1895 – 1899	Succeeded by Arthur Dewar
