= Michael Hutchison (politician) =

Scottish politician (1914–1993)

Alan Michael Clark Hutchison (26 February 1914 – 21 March 1993) was a Scottish politician. He served as a Member of Parliament for the Unionist Party and the Scottish Conservatives.

He was the son of George Clark Hutchison MP and brother of Ian Clark Hutchison MP.

Hutchison was educated at Eton College and Trinity College, Cambridge. He became a barrister, called to the bar at Gray's Inn in 1937. He was political officer and assistant secretary to the government of Aden 1948–54.

Hutchison contested Motherwell in 1955 and was Member of Parliament for Edinburgh South from a 1957 by-election to 1979, preceding Michael Ancram.

Parliament of the United Kingdom
Preceded by William Darling	Member of Parliament for Edinburgh South; 1957–1979	Succeeded by Michael Ancram
