= 1920 Edinburgh South by-election =

UK parliamentary by-election

The 1920 Edinburgh South by-election was held on 9 April 1920. The by-election was held due to the incumbent Coalition Conservative MP, Charles Murray, being appointed Solicitor General for Scotland. It was retained by Murray.

By-election 9 April 1920: Edinburgh South
Party		Candidate	Votes	%	±%
C	Unionist	Charles Murray	11,176	57.7	−17.3
	Liberal	Daniel Holmes	8,177	42.3	+17.3
Majority			2,999	15.4	−34.6
Turnout			19,353	59.3	−2.6
	Unionist hold		Swing	-17.3	
C indicates candidate endorsed by the coalition government.
