= William Darling (politician) =

Scottish politician (1885–1962)

Sir William Young Darling CBE FRSE LLD MC
- Darling in 1947. Portrait by Walter Stoneman.

Member of Parliament for Edinburgh South
- In office 1945–1957
- Preceded by: Samuel Chapman
- Succeeded by: Michael Clark Hutchison
- Majority: 12,887 (35.03%)

Personal details
- Born: 8 May 1885 Carlisle, Cumberland, England
- Died: 4 February 1962 (aged 76)
- Resting place: Traquair Parish Churchyard
- Party: Unionist
- Spouse: Agnes Olive Simpson
- Relatives: The Baron Darling of Roulanish (great nephew)
- Education: James Gillespie’s School; Daniel Stewart’s College; Heriot-Watt College
- Alma mater: University of Edinburgh
- Profession: Politician, Banker, Soldier

Military service
- Allegiance: United Kingdom
- Branch/service: British Army
- Years of service: 1914–1922
- Rank: Lieutenant
- Unit: Black Watch; Royal Scots
- Battles/wars: First World War; Irish War of Independence
- Awards: Military Cross

Sir William Young Darling CBE FRSE LLD MC (8 May 1885 – 4 February 1962) was the Unionist Member of Parliament in the British House of Commons for the Edinburgh South constituency from 1945 to 1957. He was a director of the Royal Bank of Scotland from 1942 to 1957.

== Life ==
He was born in Carlisle, the second son of William Darling of Edinburgh. He was educated firstly at James Gillespie's School then Daniel Stewart's College and Heriot-Watt College. The University of Edinburgh later awarded him an honorary Doctor of Laws (LLD).

In the First World War he joined the Black Watch as a private in 1914 and then after receiving a commission he joined the Royal Scots in 1915 as a 2nd Lieutenant. He saw much action and was wounded five times. He was awarded the Military Cross with bar and was Mentioned in Dispatches. From 1920 to 1922 he served in Ireland during the Irish War of Independence. During this period, together with Hugh Pollard (1888–1966), he jointly printed the Weekly Summary: a synopsis of the war from a British perspective. On leaving the army he became Director of the family drapers firm.

He became a member of Edinburgh Corporation in 1933 and was city treasurer from 1937 to 1940. He was Lord Provost of Edinburgh from 1941 to 1944; National Government Candidate for West Lothian, 1937; and chairman, Scottish Council on Industry, from 1942 to 1946.

He was appointed CBE in 1923 and knighted in 1943. In the Second World War he was Chief Air Raid Warden for Edinburgh from 1939 to 1941.

He died on 4 February 1962. He is buried in Traquair Parish Churchyard.

== Publications ==
The first five books were published anonymously:

- The Private Papers of a Bankrupt Bookseller (1931)
- Hades! The Ladies!: Being Extracts from the Diary of a Draper, Charles Cavers, Esquire late of Bond Street London West (1933)
- The Old Mill: Being the Candid Chronicles of Penelope Potter (1934)
- Down but Not Out: Being the True Story of Peter Gogg (1935)
- The Bankrupt Bookseller Speaks Again (1938)

Published under his own name:

- Why I Believe in God (1944)

Published under the pseudonym "Timoleon":

- King's Cross to Waverley: A Discursive Diary Telling of Persons and Policies, Opinions and Occurrences in Days of War (1944)

Published under his own name:

- You and Your Neighbour: A Presentation of Local Government (1945)
- The Bankrupt Bookseller (omnibus edition) (1947)
- A Book of Days: A Dictionary of Dates, a Chronology of Circumstance, the Face of Time (1951)
- So it Looks to Me (1952) (autobiography)
- A Westminster Lad (1955) (poems)

== Family ==
He married Agnes Olive Simpson (1885–1962) in 1914.

He was the great uncle of Alistair Darling, an Edinburgh MP from 1987 to 2015 who held various ministerial and Cabinet posts in the Labour government from 1997 to 2010.

== Artistic recognition ==
His portrait (as Lord Provost of Edinburgh), by Herbert James Gunn is held by the City of Edinburgh Council.

Parliament of the United Kingdom
Preceded by Samuel Chapman	Member of Parliament for Edinburgh South; 1945–1957	Succeeded by Michael Hutchison
