= Ian Murray (Scottish politician) =

British politician (born 1976)

The Right Honourable Ian Murray MP
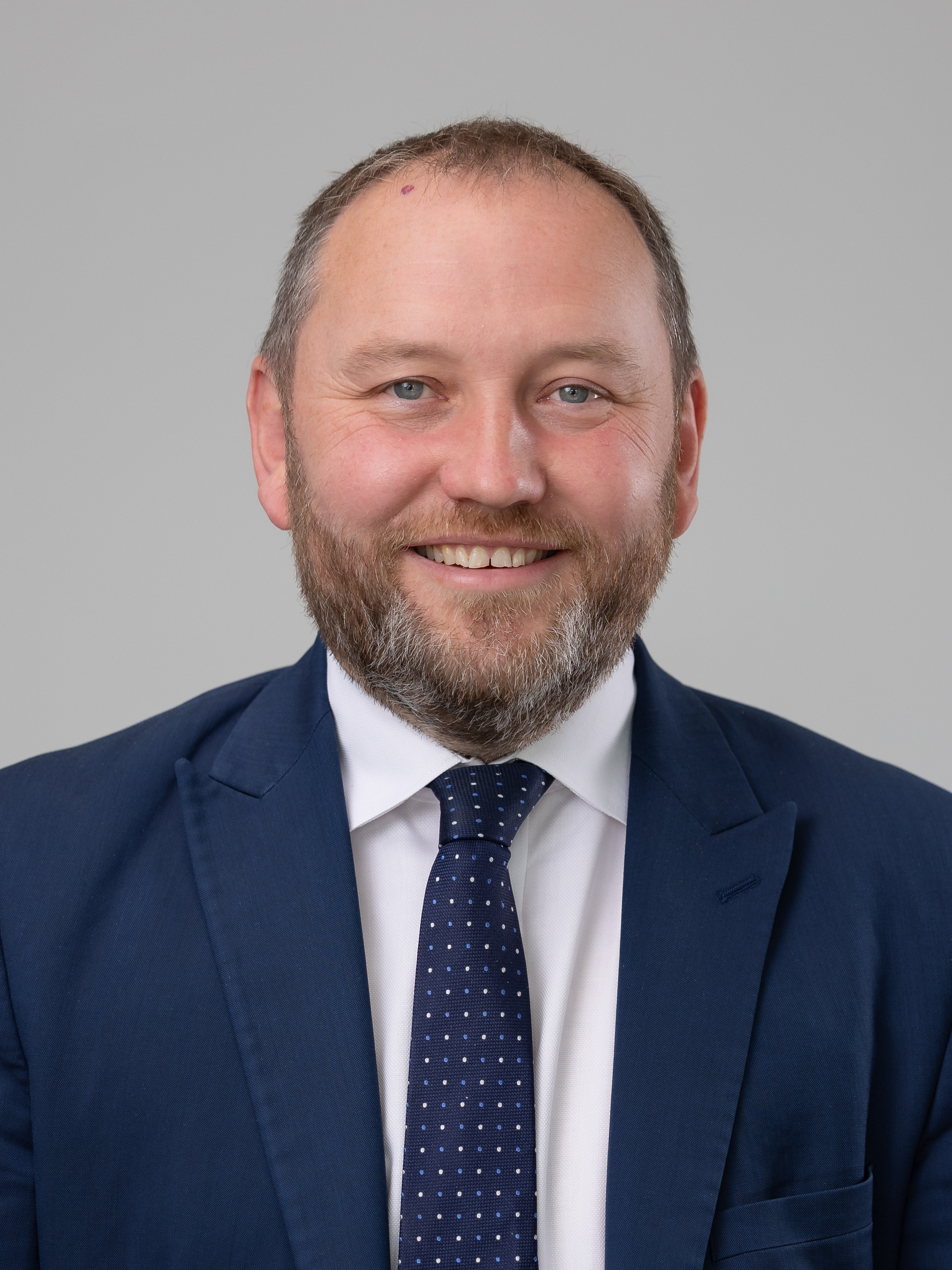
- Official portrait, 2025

Minister of State for Creative Industries, Media and Online Safety (Note: Minister of State for Creative Industries, Media and Arts until July 2026)
- Incumbent
- Assumed office 6 September 2025
- Prime Minister: Keir Starmer; Andy Burnham
- Preceded by: Chris Bryant

Minister of State for Digital Government and Data
- In office 6 September 2025 – 21 July 2026
- Prime Minister: Keir Starmer
- Preceded by: Chris Bryant
- Succeeded by: Stephanie Peacock (Digital Government)

Secretary of State for Scotland
- In office 5 July 2024 – 5 September 2025
- Prime Minister: Keir Starmer
- Preceded by: Alister Jack
- Succeeded by: Douglas Alexander
Shadow portfolios
Shadow Secretary of State for Scotland
In office 6 April 2020 – 5 July 2024
Leader	Keir Starmer
Preceded by	Tony Lloyd
Succeeded by	John Lamont
In office 11 May 2015 – 26 June 2016
Leader	Harriet Harman (acting); Jeremy Corbyn
Preceded by	Margaret Curran
Succeeded by	Dave Anderson
Shadow Minister for Trade and Investment
In office 7 October 2011 – 8 May 2015
Leader	Ed Miliband
Preceded by	Office established
Succeeded by	Stephen Doughty

Member of Parliament for Edinburgh South
- Incumbent
- Assumed office 6 May 2010
- Preceded by: Nigel Griffiths
- Majority: 17,251 (36.8%)

Personal details
- Born: 10 August 1976 (age 50) Edinburgh, Scotland
- Party: Labour
- Children: 2
- Education: University of Edinburgh (MA)
- Website: Official website

Ian Murray (born 10 August 1976) is a British politician who has served as Minister of State in the Department for Digital, Culture, Media and Sport since September 2025. He also served in the Department for Science, Innovation and Technology from September 2025 until its abolition in July 2026, having previously served as Secretary of State for Scotland from July 2024 to September 2025. A member of the Labour Party, he has been the Member of Parliament (MP) for Edinburgh South since 2010. He previously served as Shadow Secretary of State for Scotland from 2015 to 2016 and again from 2020 to 2024.

Murray previously served as a City of Edinburgh Councillor for the wards of Liberton and Liberton/Gilmerton from 2003 to 2010. Murray was the sole Labour Party MP representing a Scottish Constituency from 2015 to 2017 and from 2019 to 2023.

== Early life and career ==
Ian Murray was born on 10 August 1976 in Edinburgh, to a cooper father and shop assistant mother. He was brought up in the Wester Hailes area of Edinburgh, where he attended Dumbryden Primary School, then Wester Hailes Education Centre. Murray studied Social Policy and Law at the University of Edinburgh graduating with an M.A. Hons. While studying at university, he had a part-time job in a local fish & chip shop before setting up and running a pizza delivery service.

After graduation, Murray worked for Royal Blind in pensions management, before being head-hunted by an Edinburgh-based internet television station (Worldart.com) during the dot-com boom where he helped to build a new online TV station. Despite his efforts, the company ran out of funding and he was made redundant; he then founded his own event management business (100 mph Events Ltd). Murray also organised a student exchange programme in Nepal to fund school buildings and staff.

In 2003, Murray stood in the local elections for Liberton winning the seat for Labour at the age of 27; he later represented the larger Liberton/Gilmerton ward from 2007 to 2010.

== Parliamentary career ==
At the 2010 general election, Murray was elected as MP for Edinburgh South, winning the seat with 34.7% of the vote and a majority of 316. In 2011, he was appointed to the Official Opposition frontbench as Shadow Minister for Trade and Investment.

At the 2015 general election, Murray was re-elected as MP for Edinburgh South with an increased vote share of 39.1% and an increased majority of 2,637. He was the only Labour MP to be returned for a Scottish constituency.

He was appointed Shadow Secretary of State for Scotland on 11 May 2015 by acting Labour Party leader Harriet Harman. He was re-appointed to the same role by new leader Jeremy Corbyn in September 2015. At the snap 2017 general election, Murray was again re-elected with an increased vote share of 54.9% and an increased majority of 15,514.

Prior to the 2019 general election, Murray faced the threat of deselection when Unite the Union announced it would vote to trigger an open selection. Local members refused to back such a contest so it could not proceed. At the election Murray was again re-elected, with a decreased vote share of 47.7% and a decreased majority of 11,095. Following the election, he again became Labour's only MP in Scotland.

Murray was re-elected at the 2024 general election, with an increased vote share of 53.3% and an increased majority of 17,251. In 2024, Murray did not vote on a bill to allow assisted dying as he was on a trade trip. He had voted in favour of a similar bill in 2015.

== Shadow Cabinet (2015–2024) ==
In January 2016, Corbyn made his first frontbench reshuffle. Three shadow ministers resigned in protest and were criticised by Corbyn ally John McDonnell as being part of a "narrow right wing clique" aligned with the Blairite Progress group. Murray, a Progress member, was interviewed on the Sunday Politics Scotland programme on 10 January and criticised McDonnell, saying he should "ramp down the rhetoric".

On 26 June 2016, two days after the EU referendum, Murray resigned with other members of the Shadow Cabinet, citing a lack of confidence in Corbyn's leadership ability to win a general election. He then nominated Owen Smith in his failed leadership challenge against Corbyn. Following Corbyn's re-election as Labour leader with an increased majority, Murray said he would only return to the frontbench if Corbyn reinstated Shadow Cabinet elections and stopped using the threat of deselection to enforce loyalty. He later accused Corbyn of being "all over the place" on potential Labour cooperation with the SNP. His replacement as Shadow Scottish Secretary, Dave Anderson refused to rule out a deal with the SNP at Westminster.

On 7 January 2020, Murray announced that he would stand for election to be Deputy Leader of the Labour Party in the deputy leadership election. During the contest, he received the backing of former Prime Ministers Gordon Brown and Tony Blair. Murray finished in fourth place and was appointed as Shadow Secretary of State for Scotland by new party leader Keir Starmer.

Murray nominated Anas Sarwar in the 2021 Scottish Labour leadership election.

== Government (2024–present) ==
Following Labour's victory in the 2024 general election, Murray was appointed Secretary of State for Scotland by Prime Minister of the United Kingdom Keir Starmer. This mirrors his former position in the shadow cabinet. It was reported that Murray received a £5,200 donation from Sir Gordon Dalyell during the 2024 general election.

In 2024, Murray became the first serving Secretary of State to take paternity leave, following the birth of his second child.

In September 2025, Murray left the cabinet following a reshuffle. He returned to government as Minister of State jointly in the Department for Culture, Media and Sport and the Department for Science, Innovation and Technology.

In July 2026, he was appointed to the new government as Minister of State at the Department for Digital, Culture, Media and Sport by Andy Burnham.

== Political views ==
At the 2014 Scottish independence referendum, Murray campaigned against independence. He said that he encountered hostility from independence activists and reported that his office premises had been plastered with pro-independence "Yes" stickers, which were immediately removed. He is a member of the Fabian Society.

== Personal life ==
Murray supports Edinburgh-based football team Hearts and chaired Foundation of Hearts, the supporters' organisation which led the bid to rescue the club from administration. He stepped down in May 2015 to focus on his parliamentary duties and was replaced by Brian Cormack.

On 20 August 2020, Murray's partner Mariam gave birth to a daughter, Zola. In January 2025, Murray announced the birth of his second child, Lois. Murray was the first serving Secretary of State to take paternity leave.

Murray was sworn of the Privy Council on 10 July 2024, entitling him to be styled "The Right Honourable" for life.

== Notes ==
Parliament of the United Kingdom
Preceded by Nigel Griffiths	Member of Parliament for Edinburgh South; 2010–present	Incumbent
Political offices
Preceded by Margaret Curran	Shadow Secretary of State for Scotland; 2015–2016	Succeeded by Dave Anderson
Preceded by Tony Lloyd	Shadow Secretary of State for Scotland; 2020–2024	Succeeded by John Lamont
Preceded by Alister Jack	Secretary of State for Scotland; 2024–2025	Succeeded by Douglas Alexander
