= Samuel Chapman (British politician) =

Scottish businessman and politician (1859 - 1947)

Sir Samuel Chapman JP

Personal details
- Born: August 27, 1859 Glasgow, Scotland
- Died: April 29, 1947 (aged 87) Hove

Sir Samuel Chapman JP (27 August 1859 – 29 April 1947) was a Scottish businessman and Scottish Unionist Party politician from Perthshire.

Born in Glasgow, he unsuccessfully contested the Perth constituency in 1906 and January 1910, and the Greenock constituency in December 1910 and in 1918, but was elected as member of parliament (MP) for Edinburgh South at the 1922 general election (he was chosen as Unionist candidate for that seat over Katharine Stewart-Murray, Duchess of Atholl) and held the seat until he stepped down at the 1945 general election.

He was knighted in the 1920 New Year Honours, for "Valuable War work, especially in connection with the Perth and Perthshire Prisoners of War Fund; Public and Local services".

He died in Hove, aged 88.

== Sources ==
- Craig, F. W. S. (1983) [1969]. British parliamentary election results 1918-1949 (3rd ed.). Chichester: Parliamentary Research Services. ISBN 0-900178-06-X.

Parliament of the United Kingdom
Preceded by Charles David Murray	Member of Parliament for Edinburgh South; 1922–1945	Succeeded by William Darling
