= Charles Lyell (Liberal politician) =

British politician

Major Charles Lyell MP
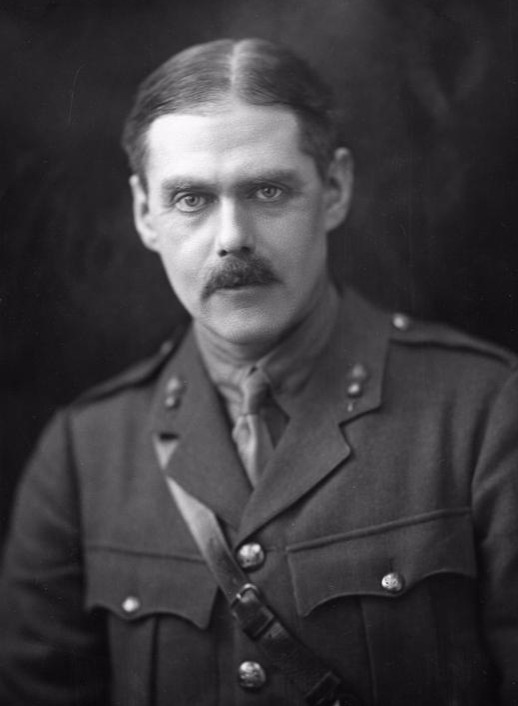

Member of Parliament for Edinburgh South
- In office 1910–1917
- Preceded by: Arthur Dewar
- Succeeded by: Edward Parrott
- Majority: 2,327 (15.4%)

Member of Parliament for East Dorset
- In office 1904–1910
- Preceded by: Humphrey Sturt
- Succeeded by: Freddie Guest
- Majority: 820 (7.4%)

Parliamentary Private Secretary to the Prime Minister
- In office 1911–1915
- Prime Minister: H. H. Asquith
- Preceded by: Geoffrey Howard
- Succeeded by: Sir John Barran

Personal details
- Born: Charles Henry Lyell; 18 May 1875
- Died: 18 October 1918 (aged 43) Washington D.C.
- Party: Liberal
- Spouse: Rosalind Margaret Watney (m. 1911)
- Children: 2
- Relatives: Leonard Lyell; Charles Lyell
- Education: Eton College
- Alma mater: New College, Oxford

Military service
- Allegiance: United Kingdom
- Branch/service: British Army
- Years of service: 1900–1908 and 1914–1918
- Rank: Lieutenant, Captain, Major
- Unit: Forfar and Kincardine Artillery; Highland Battery of the Fife Royal Garrison Artillery
- Battles/wars: First World War

Major Charles Henry Lyell (18 May 1875 – 18 October 1918) was a British politician and Liberal Member of Parliament who died in the First World War.

== Education and private life ==
Charles Henry Lyell in 1906

Lyell was born in 1875, the only son of Leonard Lyell, 1st Baron Lyell, and was educated at Eton and New College, Oxford. Whilst at Oxford he became a Freemason in the Apollo University Lodge, a Masonic lodge for students and former students of the university.

He married Rosalind Margaret Watney on 18 May 1911 at Cornbury Park, Oxfordshire. They had one son, Charles Anthony Lyell (later 2nd Baron Lyell) and one daughter, Margaret Laetitia.

== Political career ==
Lyell was elected to represent East Dorset in a 1904 by-election, and was appointed as Parliamentary Private Secretary to Sir Edward Grey, the Foreign Secretary, in 1906. He was re-elected at the 1906 general election, but failed to win election in the January 1910 general election, where he contested Edinburgh West. He was elected for Edinburgh South at a by-election in April, and won re-election in the December general election. He was appointed as the Parliamentary Private Secretary to H. H. Asquith, the Prime Minister, in February 1911, and stood down from the seat in May 1917.

== Military career ==
Lyell was commissioned as a lieutenant in the Forfar and Kincardine Artillery Militia in 1900, and served until 1908 when the Militia was dissolved under the Territorial and Reserve Forces Act 1907. He then served as the vice-chairman of the County Territorial Association for Forfarshire. On the outbreak of the First World War, he was gazetted as a captain in the Fife Royal Garrison Artillery, and in May 1915 made a major in the Highland Battery of the Fife RGA.

== Death ==
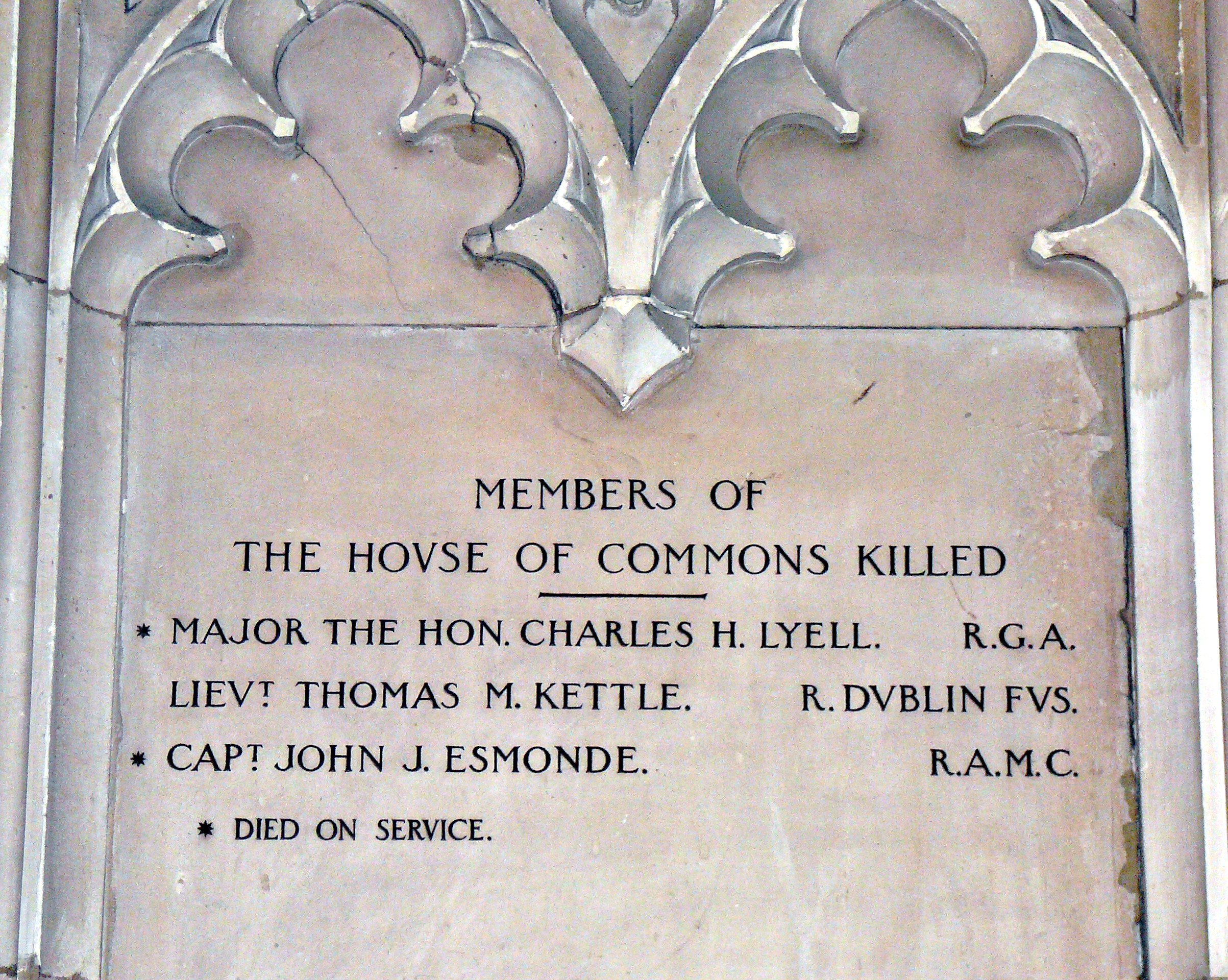
House of Commons commemoration of Lyell

Charles Henry Lyell died on 18 October 1918 of pneumonia during the global Spanish flu pandemic while serving as Assistant Military Attaché to the US, and was buried at Arlington National Cemetery. Lyell is commemorated on Panel 1 of the Parliamentary War Memorial in Westminster Hall, one of 22 MPs that died during the First World War to be named on that memorial. A further act of commemoration came with the unveiling in 1932 of a manuscript-style illuminated book of remembrance for the House of Commons, which includes a short biographical account of the life and death of Lyell.

== Notes ==
Parliament of the United Kingdom
Preceded by Humphrey Sturt	Member of Parliament for East Dorset; 1904 – January 1910	Succeeded by Freddie Guest
Preceded by Arthur Dewar	Member of Parliament for Edinburgh South; 1910 – 1917	Succeeded by Edward Parrott
Government offices
Preceded by Geoffrey Howard	Parliamentary Private Secretary to the Prime Minister; 1911–1915	Succeeded by Sir John Barran
