= Nigel Griffiths =

British politician

Deputy Leader of the House of Commons
- In office 10 May 2005 – 13 March 2007
- Prime Minister: Tony Blair
- Leader: Geoff Hoon; Jack Straw
- Preceded by: Phil Woolas
- Succeeded by: Paddy Tipping

Parliamentary Under-Secretary of State for Small Business (Note: Competition and Consumer Affairs from 1997 to 1998.)
- In office 11 June 2001 – 10 May 2005
- Prime Minister: Tony Blair
- Preceded by: Kim Howells
- Succeeded by: Barry Gardiner
- In office 5 May 1997 – 28 July 1998
- Prime Minister: Tony Blair
- Preceded by: John Taylor
- Succeeded by: Kim Howells

Member of Parliament for Edinburgh South
- In office 12 June 1987 – 12 April 2010
- Preceded by: Michael Ancram
- Succeeded by: Ian Murray

Personal details
- Born: 20 May 1955 (age 71) Glasgow, Scotland
- Party: Labour
- Spouse: Sally McLaughlin
- Education: University of Edinburgh

Nigel Griffiths (born 20 May 1955) is a British Labour Party politician, and former Member of Parliament (MP) for Edinburgh South from 1987 to 2010.

== Early life ==
Nigel Griffiths was educated at Hawick High School in the Scottish Borders before attending the University of Edinburgh where he was awarded an MA in 1977. He finished his education at the now Moray House School of Education in Edinburgh in 1978. He was president of the University of Edinburgh Labour Group in 1976, where he first met and supported Gordon Brown, who had recently served as the student-elected Rector of the University.

In 1978, he worked as a secretary to the Lothian Development Council, before becoming a welfare rights worker with a pressure group working on behalf of people with learning disabilities in 1979. He remained in this position until his election to Parliament.

He worked with Anita Roddick to establish The Big Issue in Scotland and set up the Wester Hailes Citizens Advice Bureau. He is a member of Amnesty International, Friends of the Earth, and The Ramblers.

== Political career ==
Griffiths joined the Labour Party in 1970 and was elected as a councillor on the City of Edinburgh Council in 1980, a position in which he remained until he became a member of the House of Commons. He also served as a member of the Edinburgh Health Council (1982–87). He was a member of the Edinburgh International Festival committee for three years from 1984 and was the chairman of the city council in 1986.

Griffiths was elected to parliament at the 1987 general election for Edinburgh South, when he ousted the sitting Conservative MP Michael Ancram by 1,859 votes and remained in the position until the 2010 general election. Griffiths tabled more than 1,000 questions to Conservative ministers in his first four months. He was made an Opposition Whip by Neil Kinnock in 1987, becoming a spokesman for eight years for the Department of Trade and Industry in 1989.

When Labour was elected in the 1997 general election, he became the Parliamentary Under Secretary of State at the Department of Trade and Industry, with responsibility for competition and consumer affairs. He was sacked by Tony Blair in his first reshuffle of 1998 after arguments with civil servants in the department. He spent the rest of the parliament as a member of both the procedure and the public accounts select committees. He returned to government following the 2001 general election with the same rank at the Department of Trade and Industry, this time with responsibility for small business.

In 2002 the Parliamentary Commissioner for Standards upheld complaints that Griffiths owned an office for which he was claiming expenses for rent of £10,000 a year.

Between 2005 and 2007, Griffiths served as Deputy Leader of the House of Commons, deputising for both Geoff Hoon and then Jack Straw. He resigned over the renewal of the British Trident system in March 2007.

In 2006, Nigel Griffiths has commented on the debate over veils stating "The justification I have heard is that some Muslim women feel 'comfortable' wearing the full veil, but it doesn't make others comfortable."

In March 2009, The News of the World alleged that Griffiths had an extramarital affair in his House of Commons office. He later admitted to this and apologised. He subsequently launched a legal action against the newspaper for invading his privacy and obtaining the material that supported the allegations "in an extremely underhand way".

In May 2009, The Daily Telegraph reported Griffiths had attempted to claim £3,600 for a television, DVD and digital radio to watch and listen to Scottish broadcasts. The claim was rejected by the Fees Office.

On 31 January 2010, Griffiths announced that he would stand down at the 2010 general election, and said that he would be taking up a job with an "international educational institution".

In late 2015 Griffiths became Scottish Co-ordinator of the Labour Leave campaign. In January 2016 he "stole a march on his old ally Gordon Brown, unveiling an anti-EU poster as the former PM was preparing to launch the party’s Scottish campaign for staying in." In the same month Griffiths helped to set up the cross-party Grassroots Out group.

== Publications ==
- Guide to Council Housing in Edinburgh by Nigel Griffiths, 1981
- Welfare Rights Survey by Nigel Griffiths, 1981
- Welfare Rights Guide by Nigel Griffiths, 1982
- Council Housing on the Point of Collapse by Nigel Griffiths, 1982
- Welfare Rights Guide by Nigel Griffiths, 1983
- Welfare Rights Guide by Nigel Griffiths, 1984
- Welfare Rights Guide by Nigel Griffiths, 1985
- Welfare Rights Guide by Nigel Griffiths, 1986
- Rights Guide for Mentally Handicapped People by Nigel Griffiths, 1988

Parliament of the United Kingdom
Preceded by Michael Ancram	Member of Parliament for Edinburgh South; 1987–2010	Succeeded by Ian Murray
