= 1909 Edinburgh South by-election =

UK parliamentary by-election

The 1909 Edinburgh South by-election was held on 4 March 1909. The by-election was held due to the incumbent Liberal MP, Arthur Dewar, being appointed Solicitor General for Scotland. It was retained by Dewar.

Edinburgh South by-election, 1909
Party	Candidate	Votes	%	±%
Liberal	Arthur Dewar	8,186	54.0	▼9.8
Conservative	Harold B Cox	6,965	46.0	▲9.8
Majority		1,221	8.0	▼19.6
Turnout		15,151	80.6	▼2.8
Liberal hold		Swing	▼9.8	
