= Arthur Dewar, Lord Dewar =

British politician and judge

The Right Honourable Lord Dewar
- Arthur Dewar

Senator of the College of Justice
- In office April 1910 – June 1917

Member of Parliament for Edinburgh South
- In office 1906 – April 1910

Solicitor General for Scotland
- In office February 1909 – 1910

Member of Parliament for Edinburgh South
- In office 1899–1900

Personal details
- Born: 14 March 1860; Perth, Scotland
- Died: 14 June 1917 (aged 57)
- Political party: Liberal
- Spouse: Letitia Bell (m. 1892)
- Children: 2
- Parent: John Dewar, Sr. (father)
- Relatives: Thomas Dewar (brother); John Dewar (brother)
- Education: University of Edinburgh

Arthur Dewar, Lord Dewar (14 March 1860 – 14 June 1917) was a British politician and judge who served as a Liberal Member of Parliament (MP) for Edinburgh South as well as Solicitor General for Scotland and later a Senator of the College of Justice.

== Life ==
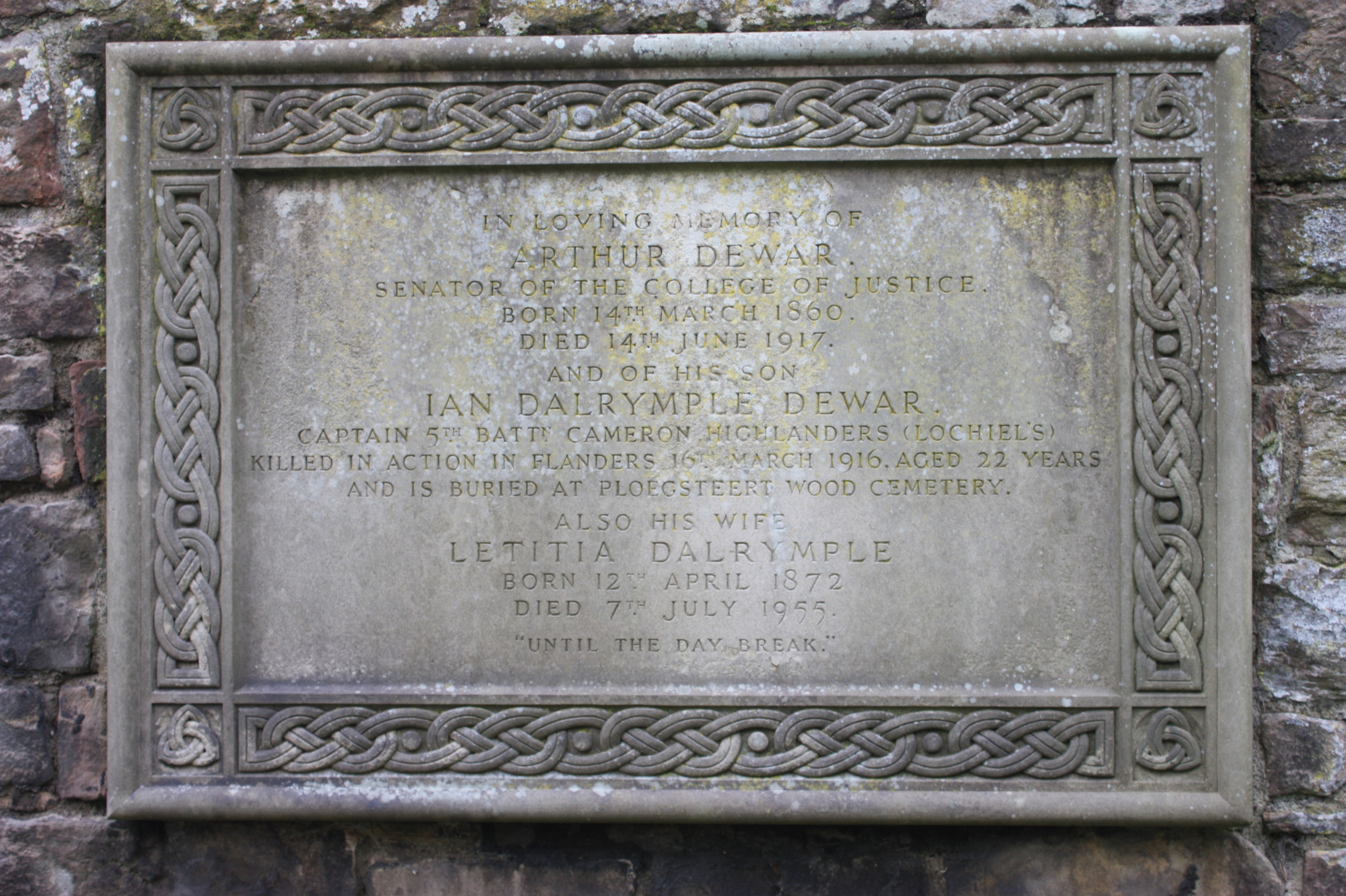
The grave of Arthur Dewar, Lord Dewar, Dean Cemetery

He was born in Perth, the fourth son of John Dewar, Sr. the distiller and founder of John Dewar & Sons. His brothers, Thomas and John, ran the family business.

He was educated at Perth Academy and then at the University of Edinburgh, graduating in 1882. He was admitted to the Scottish Bar in 1885, and in 1892 was appointed the Advocate-Depute for the Glasgow circuit, a minor governmental post, which he held until 1895 when the Conservative Party came into power.

In an 1899 by-election he was elected as the Member of Parliament for Edinburgh South, defeating Major-General A.G. Wauchope, but was defeated himself in the 1900 general election by Sir Andrew Agnew. He stood again in the 1906 general election, where he won the seat. He had been made King's Counsel in 1904, and served as Solicitor General for Scotland from February 1909 – 1910.

He was re-elected in the January 1910 general election, but resigned from the Commons in April that year when he was appointed a Senator of the College of Justice, replacing the deceased McLaren. He took the judicial title of Lord Dewar, and served in the post until his death.

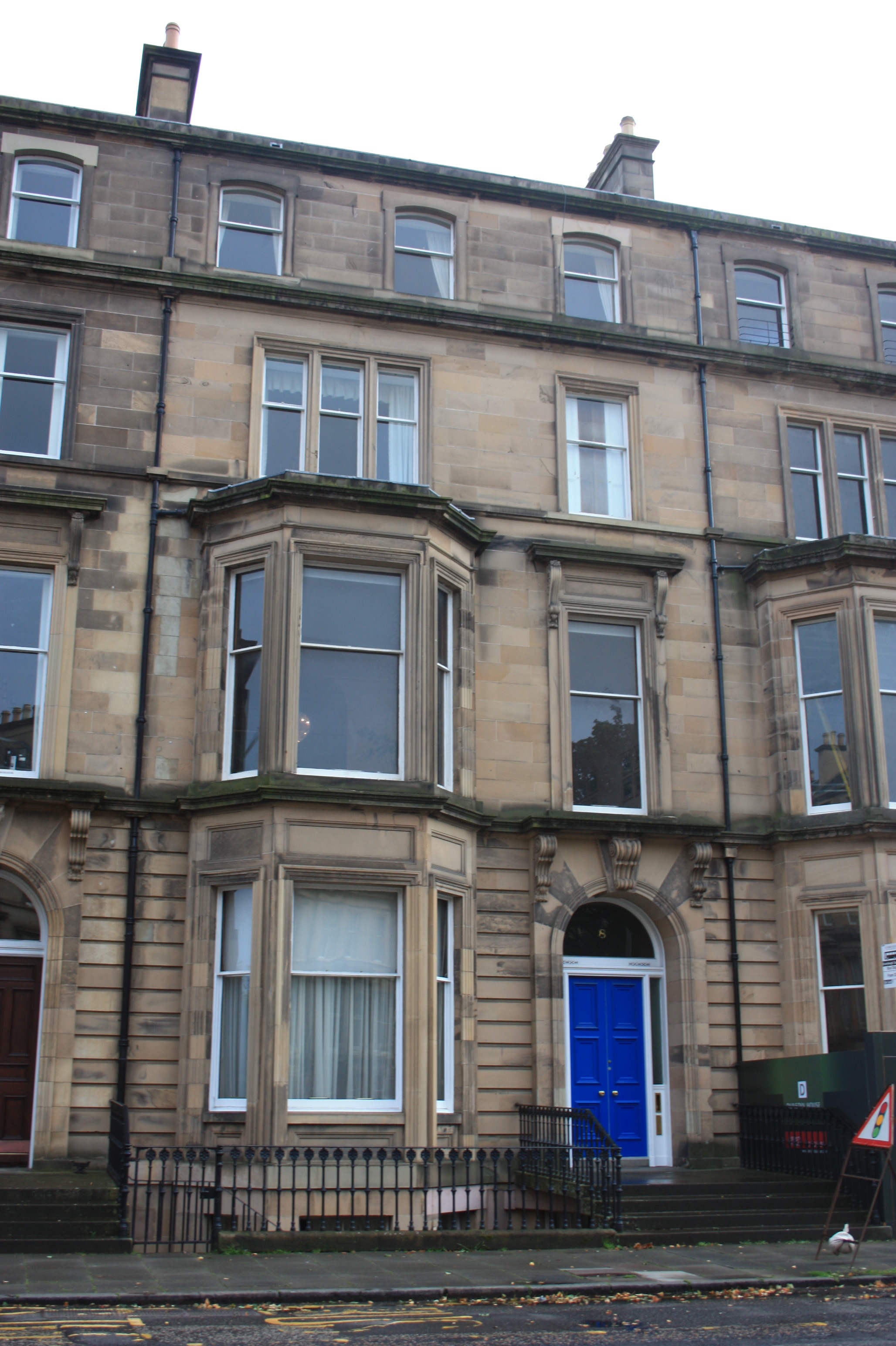
8 Drumsheugh Gardens, Edinburgh

He lived 8 Drumsheugh Gardens in Edinburgh's West End in an impressive Victorian townhouse by the Edinburgh architect John Lessels.

He is buried in the 20th century extension to Dean Cemetery in Edinburgh, against the northmost wall.

== Family ==
He married Letitia ("Lettie") Dalrymple Bell, daughter of Robert Bell of Clifton Hall, in 1892, with whom he had one son and one daughter.

His son, Ian Dalrymple Dewar, was killed during the First World War.

== Notes ==
Parliament of the United Kingdom
Preceded by Robert Cox	Member of Parliament for Edinburgh South; 1899–1900	Succeeded by Andrew Noel Agnew
Preceded by Andrew Noel Agnew	Member of Parliament for Edinburgh South; 1906–April 1910	Succeeded by Charles Henry Lyell
Legal offices
Preceded by Alexander Ure	Solicitor General for Scotland; 1909–1910	Succeeded by William Hunter
