= 1957 Edinburgh South by-election =

UK parliamentary by-election

The 1957 Edinburgh South by-election of 29 May 1957 was held after the resignation of Unionist Party MP William Darling.

The seat was safe, having been won for the Unionists by Darling at the 1955 general election by a majority of nearly 13,000 votes

== Result of the previous general election ==
General election 1955: Edinburgh South
Party	Candidate	Votes	%	±%
Unionist	William Darling	24,836	67.52	−5.06
Labour	James A. Forsyth	11,949	32.48	+5.06
Majority		12,887	35.04	−10.12
Turnout		36,785	77.24	−4.19
Unionist hold		Swing		

== Result of the by-election ==
The Unionist Party held the seat.

By-election 1957: Edinburgh South
Party	Candidate	Votes	%	±%
Unionist	Michael Hutchison	14,421	45.58	−21.94
Labour	James A. Forsyth	9,781	30.91	−1.57
Liberal	William Douglas-Home	7,439	23.51	New
Majority		4,640	14.67	−20.37
Turnout		31,641		
Unionist hold		Swing		

== See also ==
- February 1886 Edinburgh South by-election
- 1899 Edinburgh South by-election
- 1910 Edinburgh South by-election
- 1917 Edinburgh South by-election
