= Edward Parrott =

British politician

Sir James Edward Parrott (1 June 1863 – 5 April 1921) was a British teacher and author, who served as the Liberal Member of Parliament for Edinburgh South for 1917–1918.

== Life ==
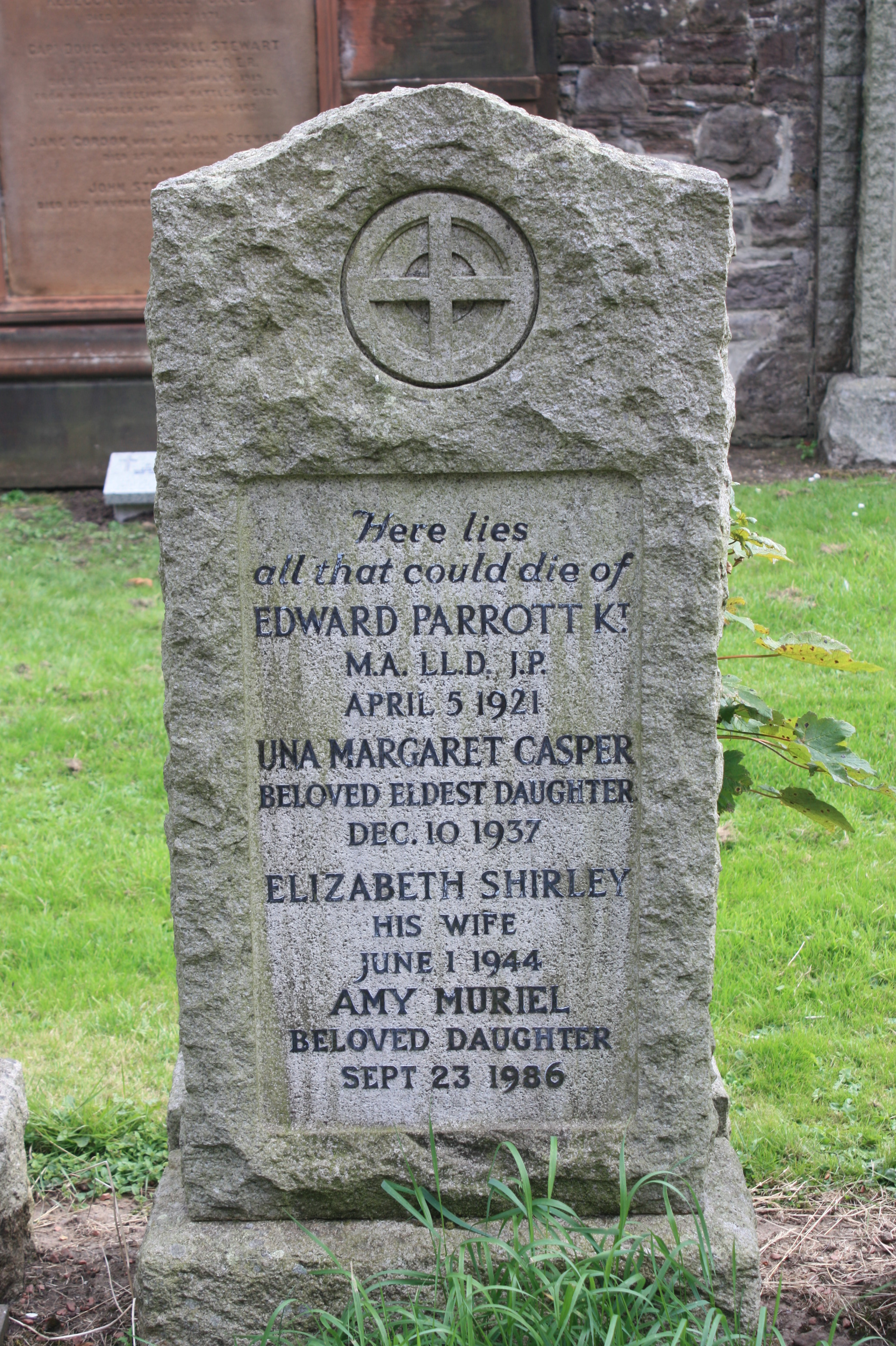
The grave of Sir Edward Parrott, Grange Cemetery, Edinburgh

He was born in Marple, Cheshire, the eldest son of a schoolteacher. He was educated at St. Paul's College, Cheltenham and then became an elementary schoolteacher, studying for a MA degree at Trinity College, Dublin at the same time. In 1891, he married Elizabeth Shirley, with whom he had three daughters; she later became the Inspectress of Schools in Liverpool. He worked in education in Sheffield and then Liverpool for several years, during which time he began to write schoolbooks; as a result of this work, he was appointed educational editor at Thomas Nelson & Sons in 1898, and moved to Edinburgh. In 1900, he was awarded the degree of LLD by Trinity College, Dublin, ranked at the head of the examination list.

He was elected chairman of the South Edinburgh Liberal Association in 1904 (until 1917), and the chair of Edinburgh United Liberal Committee in 1908 (until 1919). He was knighted in 1910 for services to the Liberal Party.

In 1917, the Member of Parliament for Edinburgh South, Charles Henry Lyell, stood down. Parrott was offered the candidacy by the local Liberal Association in April, and accepted it; it had previously been expected that the seat would be offered to Sir George Macrae. In the by-election on 12 May, he was returned unopposed. He did not contest the seat at the 1918 general election, and instead stood for election in Edinburgh West but lost to the elected Conservative. He remained loyal to H. H. Asquith in the post-war split of the Liberal Party, considering himself a "Gladstonian Liberal".

He was a Governor of Cheltenham Training College, and a Justice of the Peace for the county of city of Edinburgh. For his work with Belgian and Serbian refugees during the First World War, he received the Belgian Order of the Crown with Palms in Gold, and was an Officer of the Serbian Order of St. Sava.

He died in April 1921 aged 57 and is buried with his wife and daughters in Grange Cemetery in southern Edinburgh, facing north onto the southern path.

== Publications ==
His publications included various books on the First World War and a large number of schoolbooks, and he edited Funk and Wagnall's Standard Encyclopaedia and Nelson's New Age Encyclopaedia.

== Notes ==
Parliament of the United Kingdom
Preceded by Charles Henry Lyell	Member of Parliament for Edinburgh South; 1917 – 1918	Succeeded by Charles David Murray
