= Edinburgh South (UK Parliament constituency) =

Parliamentary constituency in the United Kingdom, 1885 onwards

Coordinates: 55°54′50″N 3°09′31″W

- Burgh constituency for the House of Commons
- Interactive map of boundaries from 2024
- Location within Scotland
- Subdivision: City of Edinburgh
- Electorate: 70,980 (March 2020)
- Major settlements: Liberton, Morningside, Colinton, Gilmerton

Current constituency
- Created: 1885
- Member of Parliament: Ian Murray (Labour)
- Created from: Edinburgh

Edinburgh South is a constituency of the House of Commons of the UK Parliament created in 1885. (Note: As with all Westminster seats which are extant it elects one Member of Parliament (MP) by the first past the post system of election.) The constituency has been held by Scottish Labour since 1987. The seat has been represented since 2010 by Ian Murray, who formerly served as Secretary of State for Scotland in the government of Keir Starmer between July 2024 and September 2025. Murray was the only Labour MP in Scotland to retain his seat at the 2015 and 2019 general elections.

Prior to the 2005 general election, the constituency had the same boundaries as the Edinburgh South Scottish Parliament constituency, now replaced by the Edinburgh Southern Scottish Parliament constituency.

== Constituency profile ==
The constituency covers the southern suburbs around the Braid Hills including Morningside, Comiston, Liberton and Gilmerton. This is a generally wealthy seat with a significant student population.

== History ==
Summary of results

A candidate fielded by the Labour Party has won the seat since 1987. Prior to that the political division for Westminster purposes voted for the Conservative and Unionist candidate, ahead of all other candidates by single preference, at each Westminster election from and including 1918. Back then, the electorates' single-most preferred candidate in simple voting was that of the Liberal Party, except in 1900 when a Liberal Unionist was returned. The 2015 result gave the seat the 23rd-smallest majority of Labour's 232 seats by percentage of majority. In the 2017 general election, Ian Murray received the highest voteshare of any Scottish candidate and was also one of only two constituencies in Scotland where the winning candidate received a majority of the votes cast (the other one being Berwickshire, Roxburgh and Selkirk).

Edinburgh South is one of three constituencies in Scotland to have never elected an MP from the Scottish National Party at any point in history, alongside Dumfriesshire, Clydesdale and Tweeddale; and Orkney and Shetland.

Recent opposition candidates' performance

At the 2015 general election three of the seven parties' candidates standing retained their deposits, their votes exceeding 5%. Those doing so and not winning were SNP – 33.8% of the vote, and Conservative – 17.5% of the vote. At this election, the SNP increased their share of the vote by over 26%, coming a close second to Murray.

The Liberal Democrat candidate of 2005 fell within 0.9% of a winning majority. The Liberal Democrats' swing nationally was −15.2% swing in 2015. The swing in this seat against the party was however −30.3% resulting in the loss of their deposit (Note: Since 1986 deposits are lost for a below 5% share of the vote, before which the threshold was 12.5%), a fate not sustained by either of the party's two formative parties in the seat since 1970.

Turnout

Turnout has ranged between 81.1% in 1950 and 57.7% in 2001.

2016 EU referendum

In the 2016 referendum of membership of the European Union, the constituency voted Remain by 77.8%. This was the tenth highest support for Remain for a constituency.

== Boundaries ==
1885–1918: The St. George, St. Cuthbert, and Newington municipal wards of the burgh of Edinburgh.

1918–1950: The Merchiston, Morningside, and Newington municipal wards of the county of the city of Edinburgh.

1950–1983: The Liberton, Morningside and Newington wards (as constituted by the Local Government (Scotland) (Edinburgh Wards) Order 1948, SI 1948/1138) of the county of the city of Edinburgh.

1983–1997: Electoral divisions 32 (Merchiston/Morningside), 33 (Sciennes/Marchmont), 34 (Prestonfield/Mayfield), 37 (Alnwickhill/Kaimes) and 38 (Inch/Gilmerton) of the City of Edinburgh.

1997–2005: Electoral divisions 32 (Merchiston/Morningside), 33 (Sciennes/Marchmont), 34 (Prestonfield/Mayfield), 36 (Alnwickhill/Kaimes) and 37 (Inch/Gilmerton) of the City of Edinburgh.

2005–2024: Under the Fifth Review of UK Parliament constituencies, the constituency boundaries were defined in accordance with the ward structure in place on 30 November 2004 and contained the City of Edinburgh wards of Merchiston, North Morningside/Grange, Marchmont, Sciennes, Newington, South Morningside, Fairmilehead, Alnwickhill, Kaimes, Moredun, and Gilmerton.

In 2005, prior to the general election, Edinburgh South was one of six covering the City of Edinburgh council area. Five were entirely within the city council area. One, Edinburgh East and Musselburgh, straddled the boundary with the East Lothian council area, to take in Musselburgh. For the 2005 election, the constituency was enlarged to include areas from the former Edinburgh Pentlands constituency, and became one of five constituencies covering the city area, all entirely within that area.

2024–present: Under the 2023 review of Westminster constituencies which came into effect for the 2024 general election, the constituency contains the following wards or part wards of the City of Edinburgh Council:

- A minority of Colinton/Fairmilehead ward, comprising the Fairmilehead district;
- nearly all of Morningside ward;
- the majority of Southside/Newington ward - excluding the Southside area to the north; and
- the whole of Liberton/Gilmerton ward.

As a result of the boundary review, the Prestonfield area of the Southside/Newington ward was transferred from Edinburgh East.

== Members of Parliament ==
Year	Member	Party
1885	Sir George Harrison	Liberal
1886 by-election	Hugh Childers	Liberal
1892	Herbert Paul	Liberal
1895	Robert Cox	Liberal Unionist
1899 by-election	Arthur Dewar	Liberal
1900	Sir Andrew Agnew	Liberal Unionist
1906	Arthur Dewar	Liberal
1910 by-election	Charles Lyell	Liberal
1917 by-election	Sir Edward Parrott	Liberal
1918	Charles David Murray	Unionist
1922	Samuel Chapman	Unionist
1945	William Darling	Unionist
1957 by-election	Michael Clark Hutchison	Unionist
1965	Michael Clark Hutchison	Conservative
1979	Michael Ancram	Conservative
1987	Nigel Griffiths	Labour
2010	Ian Murray	Labour

== Election results ==
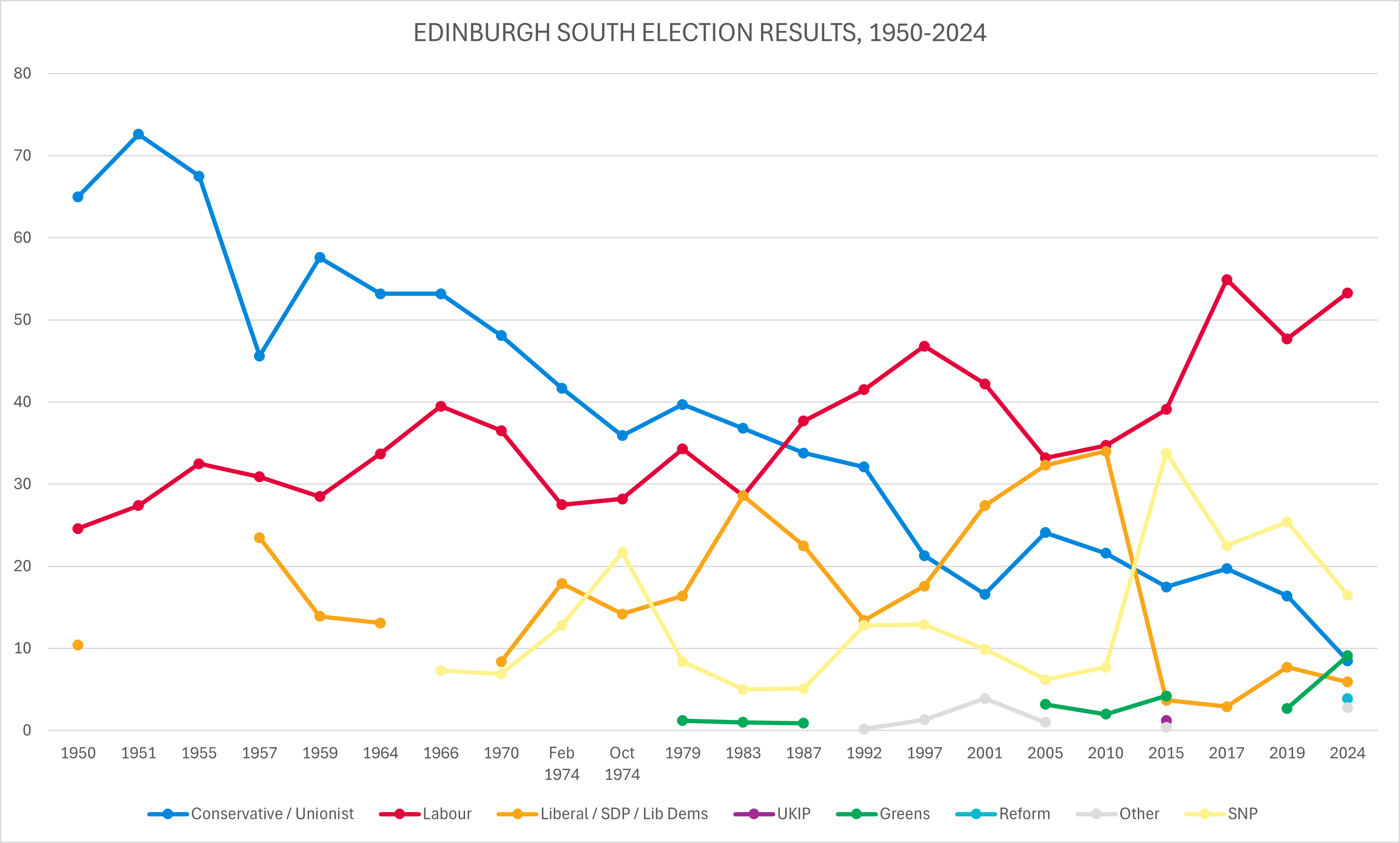
Election results 1950-2024

=== Elections in the 2020s ===
General election 2024: Edinburgh South
Party	Candidate	Votes	%	±%
Labour	Ian Murray	24,976	53.3	+7.1
SNP	Simita Kumar	7,725	16.5	−9.4
Green	Jo Phillips	4,270	9.1	+6.2
Conservative	Christopher Cowdy	4,001	8.5	−8.3
Liberal Democrats	Andy Williamson	2,746	5.9	−2.3
Reform	Cameron Rose	1,845	3.9	New
Independent	Alex Martin	466	1.0	New
Alba	Lynne Lyon	454	1.0	New
Scottish Family	Phil Holden	267	0.6	New
Independent	Mark Rowbotham	76	0.2	New
Majority		17,251	36.8	+14.5
Turnout		46,826	66.1	−8.6
Registered electors		70,838		
Labour hold		Swing	+7.2	

=== Elections in the 2010s ===
2019 notional result (Note: Estimate of the 2019 general election result as if the revised boundaries recommended under the 2023 boundary review were in place)
Party	Vote	%
Labour	24,508	46.2
SNP	13,713	25.9
Conservative	8,922	16.8
Liberal Democrats	4,344	8.2
Scottish Greens	1,542	2.9
Majority	10,795	20.4
Turnout	53,029	74.7
Electorate	70,980	

General election 2019: Edinburgh South
Party	Candidate	Votes	%	±%
Labour	Ian Murray	23,745	47.7	−7.2
SNP	Catriona MacDonald	12,650	25.4	+2.9
Conservative	Nick Cook	8,161	16.4	−3.3
Liberal Democrats	Alan Beal	3,819	7.7	+4.8
Green	Kate Nevens	1,357	2.7	New
Majority		11,095	22.3	−10.1
Turnout		49,732	75.1	+1.0
Labour hold		Swing	−5.1	

General election 2017: Edinburgh South
Party	Candidate	Votes	%	±%
Labour	Ian Murray	26,269	54.9	+15.8
SNP	Jim Eadie	10,755	22.5	−11.3
Conservative	Stephanie Smith	9,428	19.7	+2.2
Liberal Democrats	Alan Beal	1,388	2.9	−0.8
Majority		15,514	32.4	+27.1
Turnout		47,840	74.1	−0.8
Labour hold		Swing	+13.6	

General election 2015: Edinburgh South
Party	Candidate	Votes	%	±%
Labour	Ian Murray	19,293	39.1	+4.4
SNP	Neil Hay	16,656	33.8	+26.1
Conservative	Miles Briggs	8,626	17.5	−4.1
Green	Phyl Meyer	2,090	4.2	+2.2
Liberal Democrats	Pramod Subbaraman	1,823	3.7	−30.3
UKIP	Paul Marshall	601	1.2	New
Scottish Socialist	Colin Fox	197	0.4	New
Majority		2,637	5.3	+4.6
Turnout		49,286	74.9	+1.1
Labour hold		Swing	-10.9	

General election 2010: Edinburgh South
Party	Candidate	Votes	%	±%
Labour	Ian Murray	15,215	34.7	+1.5
Liberal Democrats	Fred Mackintosh	14,899	34.0	+1.7
Conservative	Neil Hudson	9,452	21.6	−2.5
SNP	Sandy Howat	3,354	7.7	+1.5
Green	Steve Burgess	881	2.0	−1.2
Majority		316	0.7	−0.2
Turnout		43,801	73.8	+3.9
Labour hold		Swing	-0.1	

=== Elections in the 2000s ===
General election 2005: Edinburgh South
Party	Candidate	Votes	%	±%
Labour	Nigel Griffiths	14,188	33.2	−6.1
Liberal Democrats	Marilyne MacLaren	13,783	32.3	+7.0
Conservative	Gavin Brown	10,291	24.1	+1.4
SNP	Graham Sutherland	2,635	6.2	−3.1
Green	Steve Burgess	1,387	3.2	New
Scottish Socialist	Morag Robertson	414	1.0	−1.2
Majority		405	0.9	−13.9
Turnout		42,698	69.9	+9.2
Labour hold		Swing	-6.5	

General election 2001: Edinburgh South
Party	Candidate	Votes	%	±%
Labour	Nigel Griffiths	15,671	42.2	−4.6
Liberal Democrats	Marilyne MacLaren	10,172	27.4	+9.8
Conservative	Gordon Buchan	6,172	16.6	−4.7
SNP	Heather Williams	3,683	9.9	−3.0
Scottish Socialist	Colin Fox	933	2.5	New
Legalise Cannabis	Margaret Hendry	535	1.4	New
Majority		5,499	14.8	−10.7
Turnout		37,166	57.7	−14.1
Labour hold		Swing	-7.2	

=== Elections in the 1990s ===
General election 1997: Edinburgh South
Party	Candidate	Votes	%	±%
Labour	Nigel Griffiths	20,993	46.8	+5.3
Conservative	Liz Smith	9,541	21.3	−10.8
Liberal Democrats	Mike Pringle	7,911	17.6	+4.2
SNP	John Hargreaves	5,791	12.9	+0.1
Referendum	Ian McLean	504	1.1	New
Natural Law	Bradley Dunn	98	0.2	0.0
Majority		11,452	25.5	+16.1
Turnout		44,838	71.8	−0.9
Labour hold		Swing	+8.1	

General election 1992: Edinburgh South
Party	Candidate	Votes	%	±%
Labour	Nigel Griffiths	18,485	41.5	+3.8
Conservative	Struan Stevenson	14,309	32.1	−1.7
Liberal Democrats	Bob McCreadie	5,961	13.4	−9.1
SNP	Roger Knox	5,727	12.8	+7.7
Natural Law	George Manclark	108	0.2	New
Majority		4,176	9.4	+5.6
Turnout		44,590	72.7	−5.0
Labour hold		Swing		

=== Elections in the 1980s ===
General election 1987: Edinburgh South
Party	Candidate	Votes	%	±%
Labour	Nigel Griffiths	18,211	37.7	+9.1
Conservative	Michael Ancram	16,352	33.8	−3.0
SDP	David Graham	10,900	22.5	−6.1
SNP	Catherina Moore	2,455	5.1	+0.1
Green	Ruth Clark	440	0.9	−0.1
Majority		1,859	3.8	N/A
Turnout		48,358	77.7	+6.0
Labour gain from Conservative		Swing	-6.0	

General election 1983: Edinburgh South
Party	Candidate	Votes	%	±%
Conservative	Michael Ancram	16,485	36.8	−6.3
SDP	John Godfrey	12,830	28.6	+12.2
Labour	Dr Robert McCreadie	12,824	28.6	−6.3
SNP	Neil MacCallum	2,256	5.0	−3.1
Ecology	Linda Hendry	450	1.0	−0.2
Majority		3,655	8.2	+2.8
Turnout		44,845	71.7	−5.6
Conservative hold		Swing		

=== Elections in the 1970s ===
General election 1979: Edinburgh South
Party	Candidate	Votes	%	±%
Conservative	Michael Ancram	17,986	39.74	+3.82
Labour	Gordon Brown	15,526	34.30	+6.12
Liberal	J.P. Bryan Lovell	7,400	16.35	+2.13
SNP	Robert Shirley	3,800	8.40	−13.29
Ecology	Stewart M. Biggar	552	1.22	New
Majority		2,460	5.43	−2.29
Turnout		45,264	77.30	+3.12
Conservative hold		Swing		

General election October 1974: Edinburgh South
Party	Candidate	Votes	%	±%
Conservative	Michael Hutchison	14,962	35.92	
Labour	C. Haddow	11,736	28.18	
SNP	Robert Shirley	9,034	21.69	+8.88
Liberal	Nathaniel L. Gordon	5,921	14.22	
Majority		3,226	7.74	
Turnout		41,653	74.18	
Conservative hold		Swing		

General election February 1974: Edinburgh South
Party	Candidate	Votes	%	±%
Conservative	Michael Hutchison	18,784	41.74	
Labour	T.J. Davies	12,403	27.54	
Liberal	Nathaniel L. Gordon	8,073	17.93	
SNP	Robert Shirley	5,770	12.81	
Majority		6,381	14.20	
Turnout		45,030	80.83	+6.84
Conservative hold		Swing		

General election 1970: Edinburgh South
Party	Candidate	Votes	%	±%
Conservative	Michael Hutchison	19,851	48.12	
Labour	John Henderson	15,071	36.53	
Liberal	Ronald H. Guild	3,469	8.41	New
SNP	David J. Stevenson	2,861	6.94	
Majority		4,780	11.59	
Turnout		41,252	73.99	
Conservative hold		Swing		

=== Elections in the 1960s ===
General election 1966: Edinburgh South
Party	Candidate	Votes	%	±%
Conservative	Michael Hutchison	20,820	53.16	−0.01
Labour	James W. Kerr	15,487	39.54	+5.82
SNP	H. McLean Robertson	2,856	7.29	New
Majority		5,333	13.62	−5.83
Turnout		39,163	77.63	−2.69
Conservative hold		Swing		

General election 1964: Edinburgh South
Party	Candidate	Votes	%	±%
Unionist	Michael Hutchison	21,375	53.17	
Labour	James W. Kerr	13,555	33.72	
Liberal	Ronald H. Guild	5,272	13.11	
Majority		7,820	19.45	
Turnout		40,202	80.32	
Unionist hold		Swing		

=== Elections in the 1950s ===
General election 1959: Edinburgh South
Party	Candidate	Votes	%	±%
Unionist	Michael Hutchison	22,799	57.59	−9.93
Labour	Alex D. Reid	11,285	28.51	−3.97
Liberal	William Douglas-Home	5,505	13.91	N/A
Majority		11,514	29.08	−5.95
Turnout		39,589	81.18	+3.94
Unionist hold		Swing		

1957 by-election: Edinburgh South
Party	Candidate	Votes	%	±%
Unionist	Michael Hutchison	14,421	45.58	−21.94
Labour	James A. Forsyth	9,781	30.91	−1.57
Liberal	William Douglas-Home	7,439	23.51	New
Majority		4,640	14.67	−20.37
Turnout		31,641		
Unionist hold		Swing		

General election 1955: Edinburgh South
Party	Candidate	Votes	%	±%
Unionist	William Darling	24,836	67.52	−5.06
Labour	James A. Forsyth	11,949	32.48	+5.06
Majority		12,887	35.04	−10.12
Turnout		36,785	77.24	−4.19
Unionist hold		Swing		

General election 1951: Edinburgh South
Party	Candidate	Votes	%	±%
Unionist	William Darling	25,545	72.58	+7.57
Labour	James A. Forsyth	10,030	27.42	+2.85
Majority		16,515	45.16	+4.73
Turnout		35,575	81.43	−0.89
Unionist hold		Swing		

General election 1950: Edinburgh South
Party	Candidate	Votes	%	±%
Unionist	William Darling	23,081	65.01	
Labour	William Earsman	8,725	24.57	
Liberal	Lionel Daiches	3,699	10.42	New
Majority		14,356	40.44	
Turnout		35,505	82.14	
Unionist hold		Swing		

=== Election in the 1940s ===
General election 1945: Edinburgh South
Party	Candidate	Votes	%	±%
Unionist	William Darling	23,652	70.77	−13.78
Labour	William Earsman	9,767	29.23	+13.78
Majority		13,885	41.54	−25.56
Turnout		33,419	66.50	−1.06
Unionist hold		Swing		

=== Elections in the 1930s ===
General election 1935: Edinburgh South
Party	Candidate	Votes	%	±%
Unionist	Samuel Chapman	27,254	83.55	N/A
Labour	Barbara Woodburn	5,365	16.45	New
Majority		21,889	67.10	N/A
Turnout		32,619	67.56	N/A
Unionist hold		Swing	N/A	

General election 1931: Edinburgh South
Party	Candidate	Votes	%	±%
Unionist	Samuel Chapman	Unopposed	N/A	N/A
Unionist hold				

=== Elections in the 1920s ===
General election 1929: Edinburgh South
Party	Candidate	Votes	%	±%
Unionist	Samuel Chapman	19,541	56.7	−7.7
Liberal	Arthur Pillans Laurie	9,849	28.6	−7.0
Labour	Arthur Woodburn	5,050	14.7	New
Majority		9,692	28.1	−0.7
Turnout		34,440	75.2	+1.6
Registered electors		45,794		
Unionist hold		Swing	−0.4	

General election 1924: Edinburgh South
Party	Candidate	Votes	%	±%
Unionist	Samuel Chapman	15,854	64.4	+8.7
Liberal	David Cleghorn Thomson	8,777	35.6	−8.7
Majority		7,077	28.8	+17.4
Turnout		24,631	73.6	+3.4
Registered electors		33,447		
Unionist hold		Swing	+8.7	

General election 1923: Edinburgh South
Party	Candidate	Votes	%	±%
Unionist	Samuel Chapman	12,804	55.7	−11.0
Liberal	William Hope	10,194	44.3	+11.0
Majority		2,610	11.4	−22.0
Turnout		22,998	70.2	+1.0
Registered electors		32,745		
Unionist hold		Swing	−11.0	

General election 1922: Edinburgh South
Party	Candidate	Votes	%	±%
Unionist	Samuel Chapman	14,843	66.7	−8.3
Liberal	Catherine Alderton	7,408	33.3	+8.3
Majority		7,435	33.4	−16.6
Turnout		22,251	69.2	+7.5
Registered electors		32,152		
Unionist hold		Swing	−8.3	

1920 by-election: Edinburgh South
Party	Candidate	Votes	%	±%
Coalition Unionist	Charles Murray	11,176	57.7	−17.3
Liberal	Daniel Holmes	8,177	42.3	+17.3
Majority		2,999	15.4	−34.6
Turnout		19,353	59.3	−2.6
Registered electors		32,656		
Unionist hold		Swing	−17.3	

=== Elections in the 1910s ===
General election 1918: Edinburgh South
Party		Candidate	Votes	%	±%
C	Unionist	Charles Murray	14,874	75.0	+29.5
	Liberal	David Caird	4,966	25.0	−29.5
Majority			9,908	50.0	N/A
Turnout			19,840	61.7	−22.5
Registered electors			32,087		
	Unionist gain from Liberal		Swing	+29.5	
C indicates candidate endorsed by the coalition government.

1917 by-election: Edinburgh South
Party	Candidate	Votes	%	±%
Liberal	Edward Parrott	Unopposed		
Liberal hold				

General election December 1910: Edinburgh South
Party	Candidate	Votes	%	±%
Liberal	Charles Henry Lyell	9,576	54.5	−1.9
Conservative	Charles Murray	7,986	45.5	+1.9
Majority		1,590	9.0	−3.8
Turnout		17,562	84.2	−4.6
Registered electors		20,868		
Liberal hold		Swing	−1.9	

1910 by-election: Edinburgh South
Party	Candidate	Votes	%	±%
Liberal	Charles Henry Lyell	8,694	57.7	+1.3
Liberal Unionist	Ralph Glyn	6,367	42.3	−1.3
Majority		2,327	15.4	+2.6
Turnout		15,061	73.7	−15.1
Registered electors		20,433		
Liberal hold		Swing	+1.3	

General election January 1910: Edinburgh South
Party	Candidate	Votes	%	±%
Liberal	Arthur Dewar	10,235	56.4	−7.4
Liberal Unionist	Harold B Cox	7,901	43.6	+7.4
Majority		2,334	12.8	−14.8
Turnout		18,136	88.8	+5.4
Registered electors		20,433		
Liberal hold		Swing	−7.4	

=== Elections in the 1900s ===
1909 by-election: Edinburgh South
Party	Candidate	Votes	%	±%
Liberal	Arthur Dewar	8,185	54.0	−9.8
Liberal Unionist	Harold B Cox	6,964	46.0	+9.8
Majority		1,221	8.0	−19.6
Turnout		15,149	80.6	−2.8
Registered electors		18,789		
Liberal hold		Swing	−9.8	

Arthur Dewar

General election 1906: Edinburgh South
Party	Candidate	Votes	%	±%
Liberal	Arthur Dewar	8,945	63.8	+14.3
Liberal Unionist	William C. Smith	5,085	36.2	−14.3
Majority		3,860	27.6	N/A
Turnout		14,030	83.4	+6.2
Registered electors		16,832		
Liberal gain from Liberal Unionist		Swing	+14.3	

General election 1900: Edinburgh South
Party	Candidate	Votes	%	±%
Liberal Unionist	Andrew Agnew	5,766	50.5	0.0
Liberal	Arthur Dewar	5,655	49.5	0.0
Majority		111	1.0	0.0
Turnout		11,421	77.2	−.1.7
Registered electors		14,794		
Liberal Unionist hold		Swing	0.0	

=== Elections in the 1890s ===
1899 by-election: Edinburgh South
Party	Candidate	Votes	%	±%
Liberal	Arthur Dewar	5,820	53.8	+4.3
Conservative	Andrew Wauchope	4,989	46.2	−4.3
Majority		831	7.6	N/A
Turnout		10,809	77.8	−1.1
Registered electors		13,891		
Liberal gain from Liberal Unionist		Swing	+4.3	

General election 1895: Edinburgh South
Party	Candidate	Votes	%	±%
Liberal Unionist	Robert Cox	4,802	50.5	+2.9
Liberal	Herbert Paul	4,705	49.5	−2.9
Majority		97	1.0	N/A
Turnout		9,507	78.9	−4.0
Registered electors		12,053		
Liberal Unionist gain from Liberal		Swing	+2.9	

Herbert Paul

General election 1892: Edinburgh South
Party	Candidate	Votes	%	±%
Liberal	Herbert Paul	4,692	52.4	−10.9
Liberal Unionist	Lewis MacIver	4,261	47.6	+10.9
Majority		431	4.8	−21.8
Turnout		8,953	82.9	+14.7
Registered electors		10,799		
Liberal hold		Swing	−10.9	

=== Elections in the 1880s ===
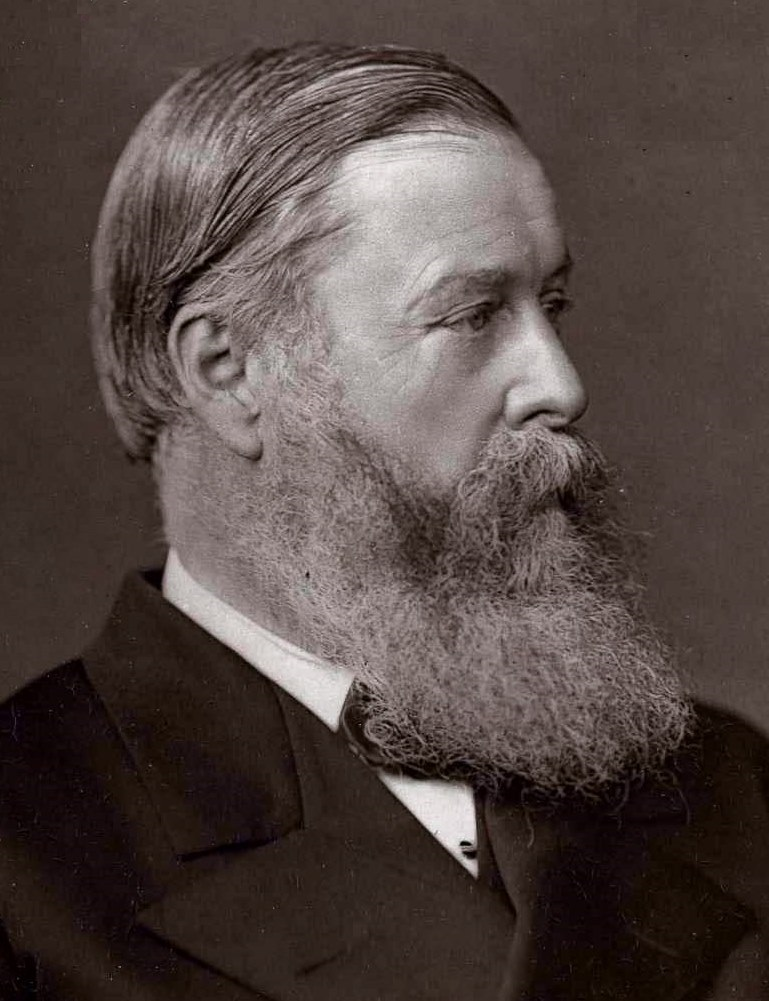
Hugh Childers

General election 1886: Edinburgh South
Party	Candidate	Votes	%	±%
Liberal	Hugh Childers	3,778	63.3	+23.1
Liberal Unionist	Robert Purvis	2,191	36.7	New
Majority		1,587	26.6	N/A
Turnout		5,969	68.2	−13.4
Registered electors		8,754		
Liberal gain from Independent Liberal		Swing		

1886 by-election: Edinburgh South
Party	Candidate	Votes	%	±%
Liberal	Hugh Childers	Unopposed		
Liberal gain from Independent Liberal				

- Caused by Childers' appointment as Home Secretary.

1886 by-election: Edinburgh South
Party	Candidate	Votes	%	±%
Liberal	Hugh Childers	4,029	70.0	+29.8
Conservative	Walter George Hepburne-Scott, 9th Lord Polwarth	1,730	30.0	New
Majority		2,299	40.0	N/A
Turnout		5,759	65.8	−15.8
Registered electors		8,754		
Liberal gain from Independent Liberal		Swing		

- Caused by Harrison's death.

General election 1885: Edinburgh South
Party	Candidate	Votes	%	±%
Independent Liberal	George Harrison	4,273	59.8	
Liberal	Thomas Raleigh	2,874	40.2	
Majority		1,399	19.6	
Turnout		7,147	81.6	
Registered electors		8,754		
Independent Liberal win (new seat)				

== Referendum results ==
=== 2016 European Union membership referendum ===
Constituency	Leave votes	Remain votes	Leave %	Remain %
Edinburgh South	10,549	37,069	22.2%	77.8%

=== 2014 Scottish independence referendum ===
Constituency	No votes	Yes votes	No %	Yes %
Edinburgh South	38,298	20,340	65.3%	34.7%

== See also ==
- Politics of Edinburgh
