= 1886 Edinburgh South by-elections =

UK parliamentary by-election

The 1886 Edinburgh South by-elections were two parliamentary by-elections held for the UK House of Commons constituency of Edinburgh South in the Scottish capital in January and February 1886.

It was the latest occurrence of two by-elections in the same constituency in the same year until the 1990 Bootle by-elections.

== Vacancy ==
Under the provisions of the Succession to the Crown Act 1707 and a number of subsequent Acts, MPs appointed to certain ministerial and legal offices were at this time required to seek re-election. The by-election in Edinburgh South was caused by the appointment of the sitting Liberal MP, Hugh Childers as Home Secretary.

== Candidates ==
Childers had been the MP for Edinburgh South for just a few days when he had to resign to seek re-election. He had won the seat on 29 January 1886 in a by-election occasioned by the death of Sir George Harrison who had been elected as an Independent Liberal at the 1885 general election. At the by-election, Childers beat his Conservative challenger, Walter George Hepburne-Scott, 9th Lord Polwarth, taking 70% of the poll. Before being selected for Edinburgh South, Childers had been MP for Pontefract in the West Riding of Yorkshire since 1860 but had lost the seat narrowly at the 1885 general election.

Childers also had a distinguished government career behind him by 1886 having been, amongst other posts he held, First Lord of the Admiralty, Secretary of State for War and Chancellor of the Exchequer in previous Liberal administrations.

The writ for the by-election was moved in Parliament on 4 February by Arnold Morley, who went on to be the new government’s Chief Whip, along with a number of writs for other seats involving newly appointed ministers in Gladstone's third administration. These included Gladstone himself, Joseph Chamberlain, Vernon Harcourt and Henry Campbell-Bannerman amongst others.

Having been so roundly beaten so recently in the constituency, the Tories did not wish to contest Childers’ appointment to the government and there being no other nominations, Childers was returned unopposed.

== January result ==
1886 by-election: Edinburgh South
| Party | Candidate | Votes | % | ±% |
|---|---|---|---|---|
| Liberal | Hugh Childers | 4,029 | 70.0 | +29.8 |
| Conservative | Walter George Hepburne-Scott, 9th Lord Polwarth | 1,730 | 30.0 | New |
| Majority | | 2,299 | 40.0 | N/A |
| Turnout | | 5,759 | 65.8 | −15.8 |
| Registered electors | | 8,754 | | |
| Liberal gain from Independent Liberal | | Swing | ' | |

== February result ==
Edinburgh South by-election, 9 February 1886
| Party | Candidate | Votes | % | ±% |
|---|---|---|---|---|
| Liberal | Hugh Childers | Unopposed | N/A | N/A |
| Liberal hold | | | | |

== See also ==
- 1899 Edinburgh South by-election
- 1910 Edinburgh South by-election
- 1917 Edinburgh South by-election
- 1957 Edinburgh South by-election
- List of United Kingdom by-elections
- United Kingdom by-election records
