= 1917 Edinburgh South by-election =

1917 UK parliamentary by-election

The 1917 Edinburgh South by-election was a parliamentary by-election held for the UK House of Commons constituency of Edinburgh South in Scotland on 12 May 1917.

== Vacancy ==
The by-election was caused by the resignation of the sitting Liberal MP, Charles Henry Lyell. Lyell, who was formerly MP for East Dorset from 1904 to 1910, had been MP for Edinburgh South since winning the seat in a by-election in April 1910. He was a serving member of the armed forces during the Great War, having joined the Fife Royal Garrison Artillery on the outbreak of war. He was on active service until 1917 when he was appointed Military Attaché to the USA.

== Candidates ==
It was widely believed that the seat was marked out for Sir George McCrae, former MP for Edinburgh East. The Chief Liberal Whip of the Coalition government, Neil Primrose was standing down and if a seat could be found for him the position was to be offered to McCrae. However, on 19 April 1917, the executive committee of South Edinburgh Liberals selected Sir Edward Parrott, the chairman of their Association and of the Edinburgh United Liberal Committee, as their candidate. Parrott was described as a Gladstonian Liberal of the old school with a loyalty to Mr Asquith but his selection ahead of the government's preferred choice was not challenged by the prime minister.

There was no history of any parties representing the Labour movement intervening in any Edinburgh seats since their creation for the 1885 general election. So it was not surprising that the Labour Party honoured the wartime electoral truce and failed to stand a candidate. The Conservatives, as partners in the wartime coalition, also declined to stand.

== Result ==
There being no other candidates putting themselves forward Parrott was returned unopposed. Parrott held the seat just over a year until the 1918 general election. His loyalty to Asquith caused him to stand as an Independent Liberal in Edinburgh West in 1918 but he lost to a Coalition Conservative in a three cornered contest with Labour. The Edinburgh South seat also went to a Coalition Conservative.

Edinburgh South by-election, 1917
Party	Candidate	Votes	%	±%
Liberal	Edward Parrott	Unopposed	N/A	N/A
Liberal hold				

== See also ==
- List of United Kingdom by-elections
- United Kingdom by-election records
- February 1886 Edinburgh South by-election
- 1899 Edinburgh South by-election
- 1910 Edinburgh South by-election
- 1957 Edinburgh South by-election
