= Charles Murray, Lord Murray =

Scottish politician (1866–1936)

Charles Murray CMG, PC, DL, FRSE
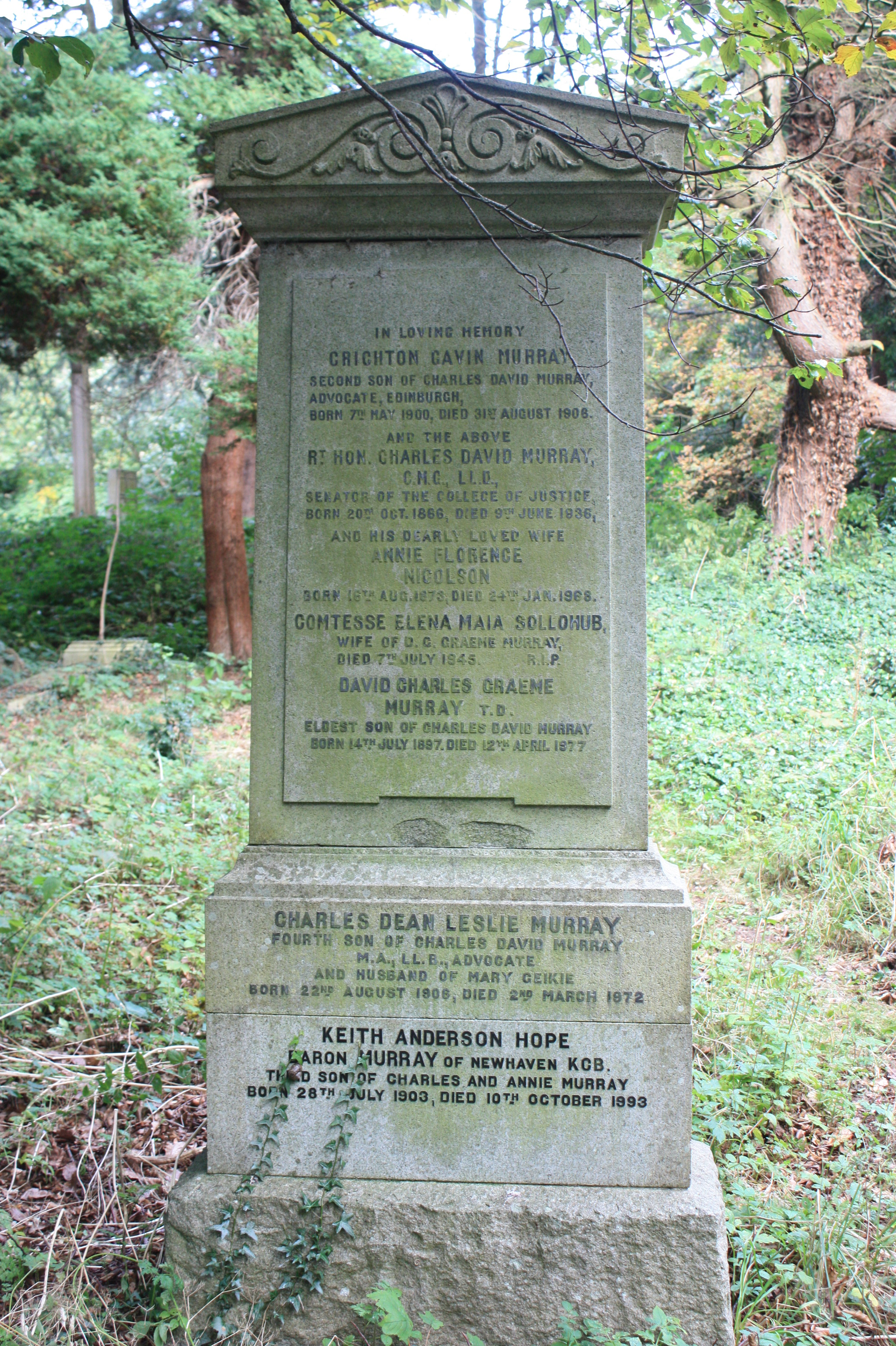
- The grave of Charles Murray, Lord Murray, Warriston Cemetery

Lord Advocate
- In office March–October 1922

Solicitor General for Scotland
- In office 1920–1922

Member of Parliament for Edinburgh South
- In office 1918-1922

Sheriff of Renfrewshire and Buteshire
- In office 1918

Personal details
- Born: 20 October 1866; London, England
- Died: 9 June 1936 (aged 69); Edinburgh, Scotland
- Political party: Scottish Tory
- Spouse: Annie Nicolson (m. 1896)
- Children: 4, including Keith
- Education: University of Edinburgh
- Military career
- Allegiance: United Kingdom
- Service / branch: Royal Engineers
- Rank: Major
- Awards: Order of St Michael and St George

Charles David Murray, Lord Murray, CMG, PC, DL, FRSE (20 October 1866 – 9 June 1936) was a Scottish Tory politician, lawyer and judge. He became Lord Advocate in 1922.

== Life ==
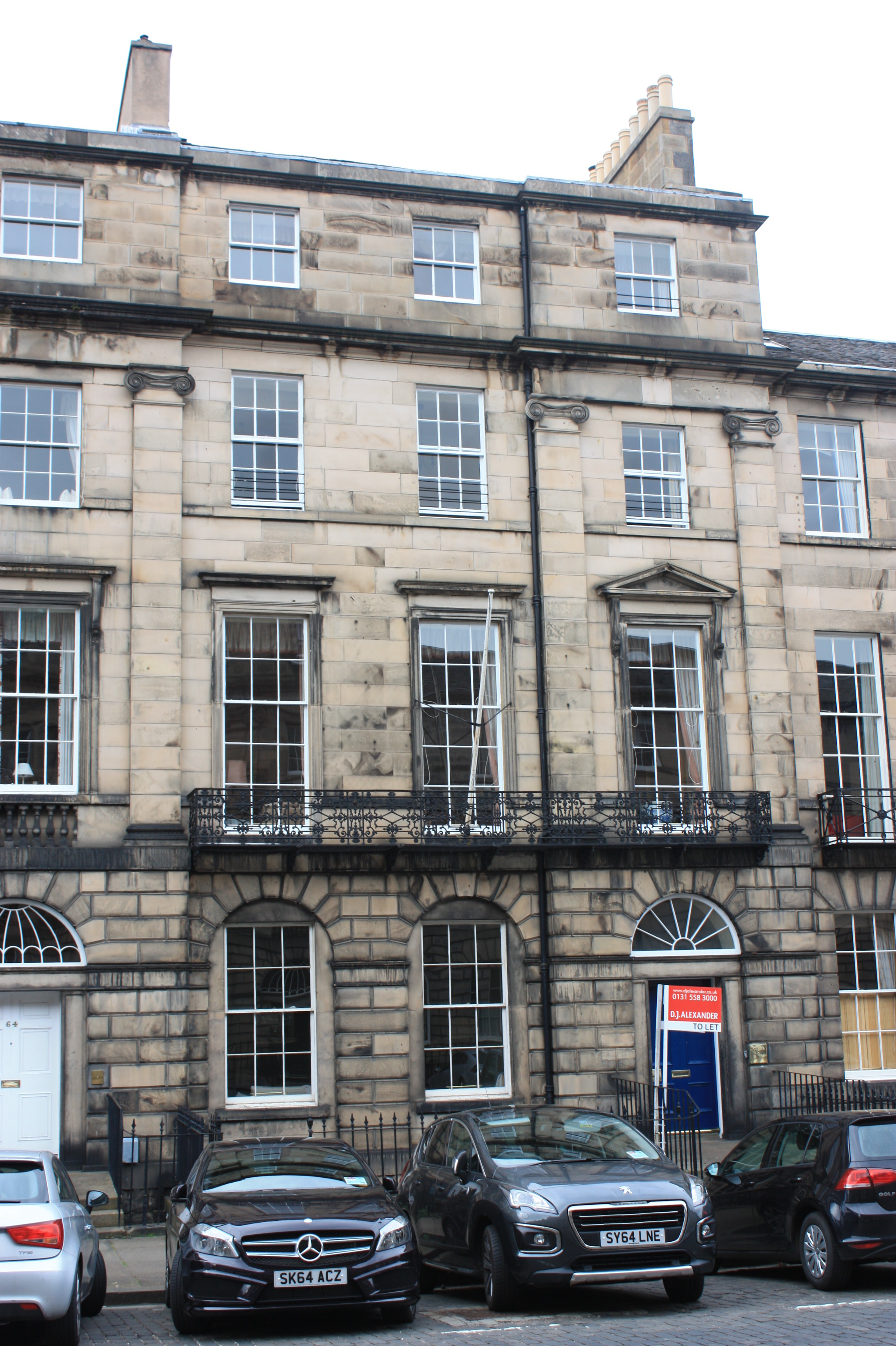
62 Great King Street, Edinburgh

He was born in London the son of David William Murray, a merchant.

Murray was educated at Edinburgh Academy and then studied law at the University of Edinburgh, was admitted as an advocate in 1889 and appointed a King's Counsel in 1909. He was a Major in the Fourth Division of the Royal Engineers (Volunteers), resigning in 1907. He was on the War Office staff from 1915 to 1917, and was appointed a temporary Lieutenant Colonel and Director of National Service for Scotland in 1917. He was appointed a Companion of the Order of St Michael and St George (Military Division) in 1918. He became Sheriff of Renfrewshire and Buteshire in 1918, and was awarded an LLD by the University of Edinburgh in 1919.

Murray was an unsuccessful parliamentary candidate in Edinburgh South in 1910, but was elected for the seat in December 1918, holding it until October 1922. He was Dean of the Faculty of Advocates from 1919 to 1920, and was appointed Solicitor General for Scotland in March 1920. He was sworn of the Privy Council and promoted to Lord Advocate in March 1922, holding office until October of that year. He was then raised to the bench with the judicial title Lord Murray, where he served until his death in 1936.

In 1923 he was elected a Fellow of the Royal Society of Edinburgh. His proposers were Francis Gibson Baily, James Hartley Ashworth, Sir Francis Grant Ogilvie, Sir Edmund Taylor Whittaker and William A.P. Tait.

In later life he is listed as living at 62 Great King Street in Edinburgh's New Town, a large and impressive Georgian townhouse.

He became a deputy lieutenant of Fife in 1922.

He died in Edinburgh on 9 June 1936 and is buried in the central roundel in Warriston Cemetery.

== Family ==
In 1896 he was married to Annie Florence Nicolson (1873–1968), and together they had four sons. Their eldest son, David Charles Graeme Murray, married the Comtesse Elena Maia Sollohub. Their second son, Crichton Gavin Murray died while a child, their third son, Keith Anderson Hope Murray (1903–1993), became Baron Murray of Newhaven, and his youngest son, Charles Dean Leslie Murray (1906–1972) was an advocate.

Parliament of the United Kingdom
Preceded by Edward Parrott	Member of Parliament for Edinburgh South; 1918–1922	Succeeded by Samuel Chapman
Legal offices
Preceded by Thomas Brash Morison	Solicitor General for Scotland; 1920–1922	Succeeded by Andrew Constable
Preceded by Thomas Brash Morison	Lord Advocate; March–October 1922	Succeeded by William Watson
