= Magersfontein =

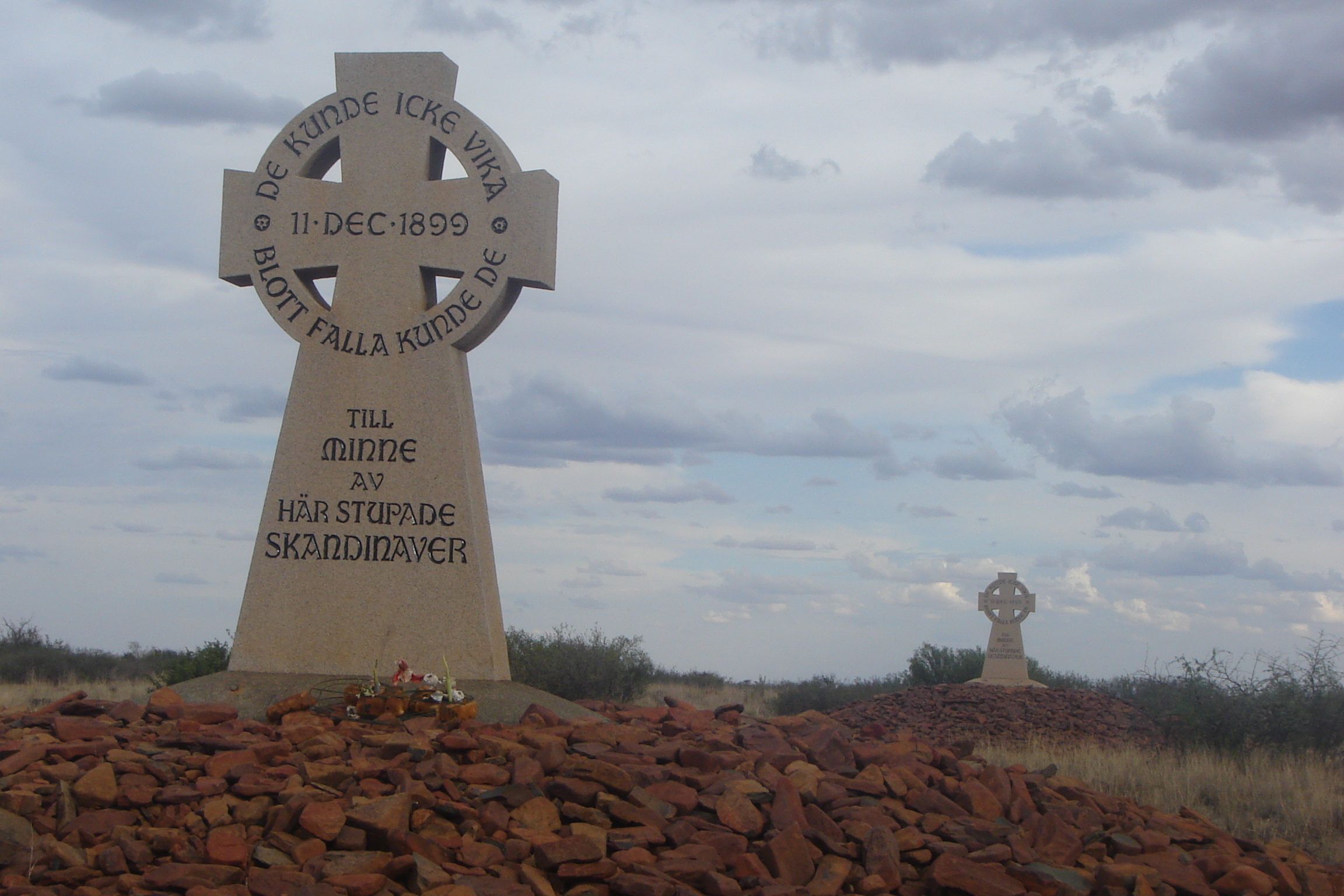
Memorial at Magersfontein to fallen Scandinavian soldiers from the Battle of Magersfontein

The Magersfontein (Note: Misspelt "Maaghersfontein" in some British texts) (/ˈmɑːxərsfɒnteɪn/ MAHKH-ərs-fon-tayn) battlefield is a site of the Battle of Magersfontein (11 December 1899), part of the Second Boer War in South Africa. The battlefield is located at 28°58′23″S 24°41′53.76″E south of Kimberley, Northern Cape Province, South Africa and can be reached either via the airport road (31.5 km), or by national road via the Modder River (47.5 km).
