= Craigellachie distillery =

Whisky distillery in Moray, Scotland, UK

Coordinates: 57°29′19″N 03°11′05″W

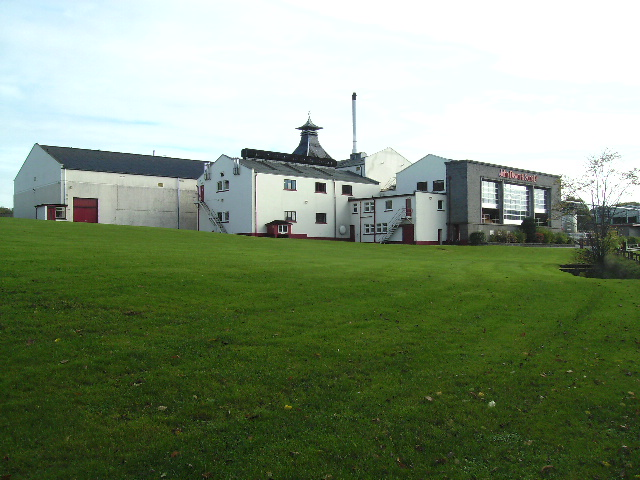

Region: Speyside
- Location: Craigellachie, Moray, Banffshire
- Owner: John Dewar & Sons (Bacardi)
- Founded: 1891
- Status: Operational
- Water source: Local
- No. of stills: 2 wash stills 2 spirit stills
- Capacity: 4,000,000 litres of alcohol per annum

Craigellachie
- Type: Single malt
- ABV: 43%

Craigellachie distillery (/kreɪɡˈɛləxi/) is a single malt Scotch whisky distillery in the village of Craigellachie at the centre of the Speyside whisky producing area of Scotland. The name Craigellachie means 'rocky hill' and refers to the cliff that overlooks the Spey across from The Macallan distillery.

John Dewar & Sons, Ltd operates the distillery. Dewar's also controls Royal Brackla, Aberfeldy, Aultmore, and Macduff.

== History ==
The Craigellachie distillery was built in 1891 by Craigellachie Distillery Co. Limited, a group of blenders and merchants led by Alexander Edward. Two years later, it was incorporated as a limited company, and in 1896, it was reconstructed as Craigellachie-Glenlivet Distillery Ltd.

During the years that followed, ownership passed to Peter Mackie (in 1916), the Distillery Company Limited (in 1927), and SMD (in 1930). The transfer to SMD marked the beginning of a period of stability for Craigellachie; apart from a reconstruction in 1964-65 during which the number of pot stills was doubled, relatively little happened at the distillery.

In 1998, it was sold to John Dewar & Sons.

In March 1998, Diageo sold John Dewar & Sons to Bacardi.

In 2014, a 13-year-old, 17-year-old, a travel retail exclusive 19-year-old, and a limited 23-year-old were released as part of the Dewar & Sons' Last Great Malts of Scotland. From 2023 the core range consists of the 13-year-old, a 13-year-old finished in Bas Armagnac-casks, a 17-year-old and the 23-year-old.

During its history, the distillery has released only a handful of official bottlings. The distillery's product is currently primarily used for Dewar's blended whisky.
