= Bacardi =

Alcoholic beverage company

Bacardi Limited
- Type: Private
- Industry: Drink industry
- Founded: 4 February 1862; 164 years ago Santiago de Cuba
- Founder: Facundo Bacardí Massó
- Headquarters: Hamilton, Bermuda
- Key people: Facundo L. Bacardi (chairman); Mahesh Madhavan (CEO)
- Products: Bacardí rum, Grey Goose vodka, Patrón tequila, Dewar's blended Scotch whisky, Bombay Sapphire gin, Martini & Rossi vermouth and sparkling wines, Eristoff vodka, Cazadores tequila, Angel's Envy bourbon and more
- Website: bacardilimited.com

Bacardi Limited (/bəˈkɑːrdi/ bə-KAR-dee, Spanish: [bakaɾˈði], Catalan: [bəkəɾˈði]) is the largest privately held, family-owned spirits company in the world. Originally known for its Bacardí brand of white rum, it now has a portfolio of more than 200 brands and labels. Founded in Cuba in 1862 by Facundo Bacardí i Massó, a Spanish businessman born in Sitges, Bacardi Limited has been family-owned for seven generations, and employs more than 8,000 people with sales in approximately 170 countries. Bacardi Limited is the group of companies as a whole and includes Bacardi International Limited.

Bacardi Limited is headquartered in Hamilton, Bermuda, and has a board of directors led by the original founder's great-great-grandson, Facundo L. Bacardí, the board's chairman. The company's Cathedral of Rum in Puerto Rico, the largest rum distillery in the world, produces 85% of Bacardi rum worldwide, while the remaining 15% originates from distilleries in Mexico and India.

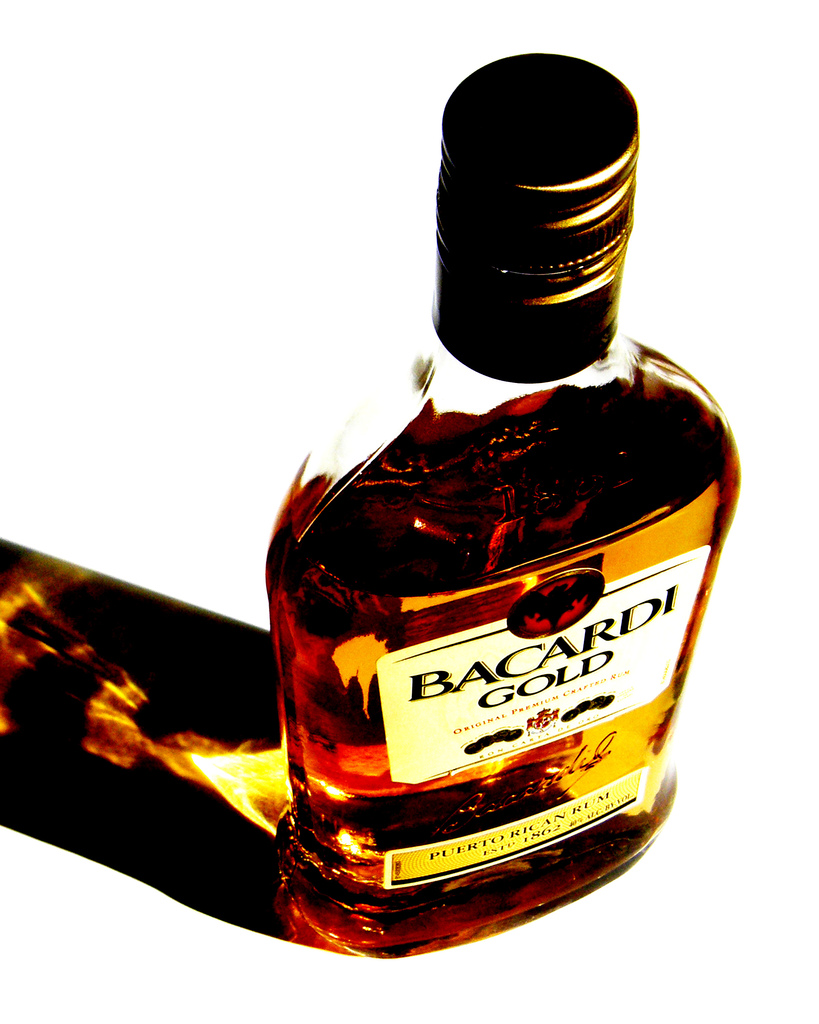
Bacardi rum

== History ==
=== Early history ===
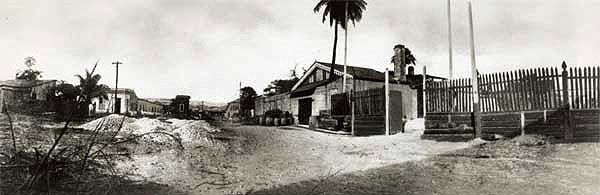
The original Bacardi distillery in Santiago de Cuba

Facundo Bacardí Massó, a Spanish wine merchant, was born in Sitges, Catalonia, Spain, on October 16, 1814, and immigrated to Santiago, Cuba, in 1830. At the time, rum was cheaply made and not considered a refined drink, and rarely sold in upmarket taverns or purchased by the growing emerging middle class on the island. Facundo began attempting to "tame" rum by isolating a proprietary strain of yeast harvested from local sugar cane still used in Bacardí production today. This yeast gives Bacardí rum its flavour profile. After experimenting with several techniques for close to ten years, Facundo pioneered charcoal rum filtration, which removed impurities from his rum. Facundo then created two separate distillates that he could blend together, balancing a variety of flavors: Aguardiente (a robust, flavorful distillate) and Redestillado (a refined, delicate distillate). Once Facundo achieved the perfect balance of flavors by marrying the two distillates together, he purposefully aged the rum in white oak barrels to develop subtle flavors and characteristics while mellowing out those that were unwanted. The final product was the first clear, light-bodied, and mixable "white" rum in the world.

Moving from the experimental stage to a more commercial endeavour as local sales began to grow, Facundo and his brother José purchased a Santiago de Cuba distillery on February 4, 1862, which housed a still made of copper and cast iron. In the rafters of this building lived fruit bats– the inspiration for the Bacardi bat logo. It was the idea of Doña Amalia, Facundo's wife, to adopt the bat to the rum bottle when she recognized its symbolism of family unity, good health, and good fortune to her husband's homeland of Spain. This logo was pragmatic considering the high illiteracy rate in the 19th century, enabling customers to easily identify the product.

The 1880s and 1890s were turbulent times for Cuba and the company. Emilio Bacardí, Don Facundo's eldest son, known for his forward thinking in both his professional and personal life and a passionate advocate for Cuban Independence was imprisoned twice for having fought in the rebel army against Spain in the Cuban War of Independence.

Emilio's brothers, Facundo and José, and their brother-in-law Enrique 'Henri' Schueg, remained in Cuba with the difficult task of sustaining the company during a period of war. With Don Facundo's passing in 1886, Doña Amalia sought refuge by exile in Kingston, Jamaica. At the end of the Cuban War of Independence during the US occupation of Cuba, "The Original Cuba Libre" and the Daiquiri cocktails were both created, with the then Cuban based Bacardí rum.

In 1901, following the Spanish-American War, Emilio Bacardí was elected mayor of Santiago. During his time in public office, Emilio established schools and hospitals, completed municipal projects such as the famous Padre Pico Street and the Bacardi Dam, financed the creation of parks, and decorated the city of Santiago with monuments and sculptures. In 1912, Emilio and his wife travelled to Egypt, where he purchased a mummy (still on display) for the future Emilio Bacardi Moreau Municipal Museum in Santiago de Cuba. In Santiago, his brother Facundo M. Bacardí continued to manage the company along with Schueg, who began the company's international expansion by opening bottling plants in Barcelona (1910) and New York City (1916). The New York plant was soon shut down due to Prohibition, yet during this time Cuba became a hotspot for US tourists, kicking off a period of rapid growth for the Bacardi company and the onset of cocktail culture in America.

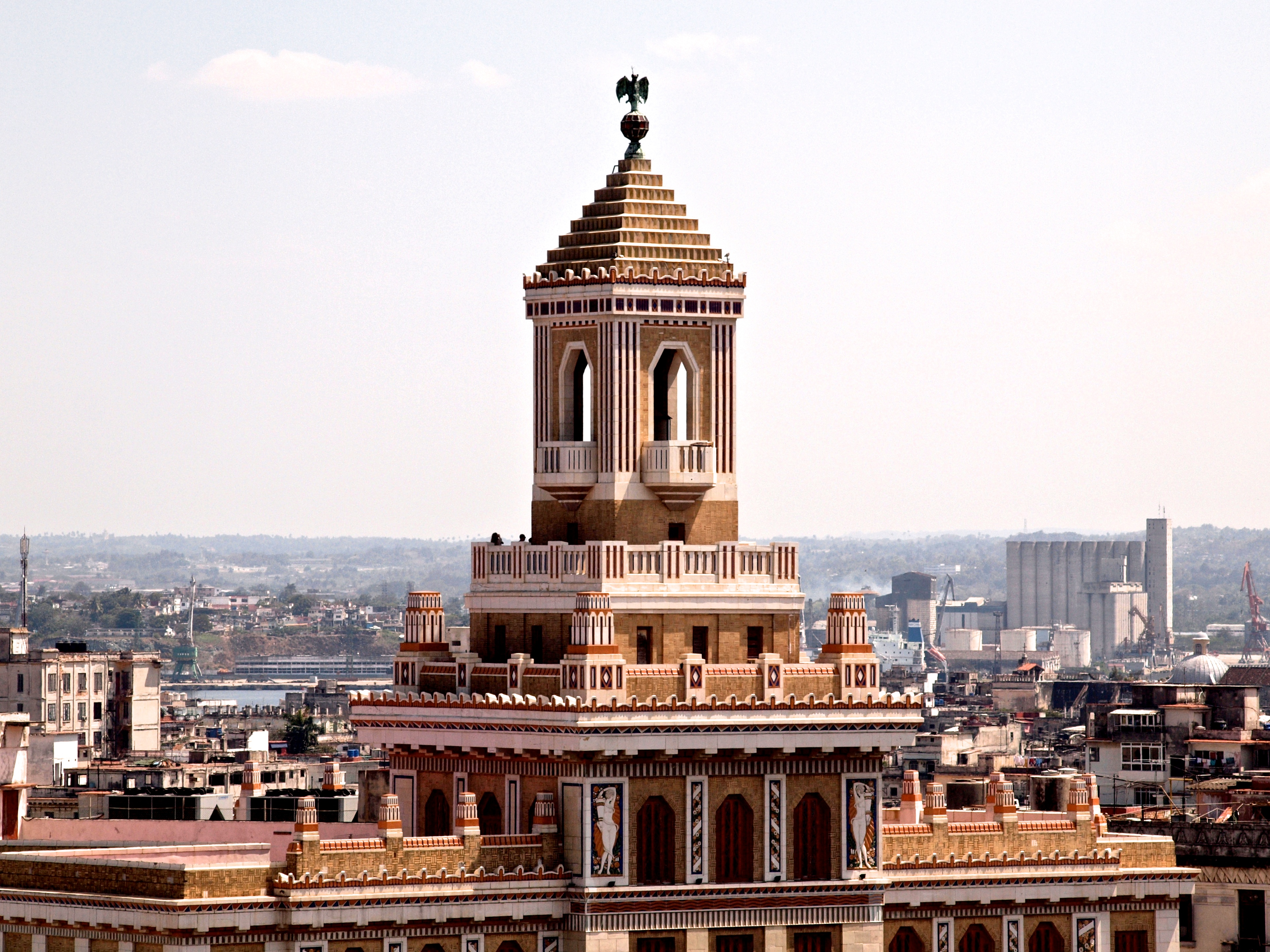
The Bacardi Building in Havana was constructed in 1930 but abandoned when the company fled Cuba following the Cuban Revolution in 1959

In 1922, the family completed the expansion and renovation of the original distillery in Santiago, increasing the site's rum production capacity. In 1930 Schueg oversaw the construction and opening of Edificio Bacardí in Havana, regarded as one of the finest Art Deco buildings in Latin America, as the third generation of the Bacardí family entered the business. In 1927, Bacardi ventured outside the realm of spirits for the first time, with the introduction of an authentic Cuban Malt beer: Hatuey beer.

Bacardi's success in transitioning into an international brand and company was due mostly to Schueg, who branded Cuba as "The home of rum", and Bacardí as "The king of rums and the rum of Kings". Expansion began overseas, first to Mexico in 1931, where architects Ludwig Mies Van Der Rohe and Felix Candela designed office buildings and a bottling plant in Mexico City during the 1950s. The building complex was added to the tentative list of UNESCO's World Heritage Site list on 20 November 2001. In 1936, Bacardi began producing rum on U.S. territory in Puerto Rico after Prohibition which enabled the company to sell rum tariff-free in the United States. The company later expanded to the United States in 1944 with the opening of Bacardi Imports, Inc. in Manhattan, New York City.

During World War II, the company was led by Schueg's son-in-law, José "Pepin" Bosch. Pepin founded Bacardi Imports in New York City and became Cuba's Minister of the Treasury in 1949.

=== Cuban Revolution ===
During the Cuban Revolution in 1959, the Bacardí family (and hence the company) supported and aided the rebels. However, after the triumph of the revolutionaries, and turn to communism, the family maintained a fierce opposition to Fidel Castro's policies in Cuba in the 1960s. In his book, Bacardi and the Long Fight for Cuba, Tom Gjelten describes how the Bacardí family and the company left Cuba in exile after the Cuban government confiscated the company's Cuban assets without compensation on 14 October 1960, particularly nationalizing and banning all private property on the island as well as all bank accounts. However, due to concerns over the previous Cuban leader, Fulgencio Batista, the company had started foreign branches a few years before the revolution; the company moved the ownership of its trademarks, assets and proprietary formulas out of the country to the Bahamas prior to the revolution and already produced Bacardí rum at other distillery sites in Puerto Rico and Mexico. This helped the company survive after the Cuban government confiscated all Bacardí assets without compensation.

In 1965, over 100 years after the company was established in Cuba, Bacardi established new roots and found a new home with global headquarters in Hamilton, Bermuda. In February 2019, Bacardi's CEO, Mahesh Madhavan, stated that Bacardí's global headquarters would remain in Bermuda for the next "500 years" and that "Bermuda is our home now."

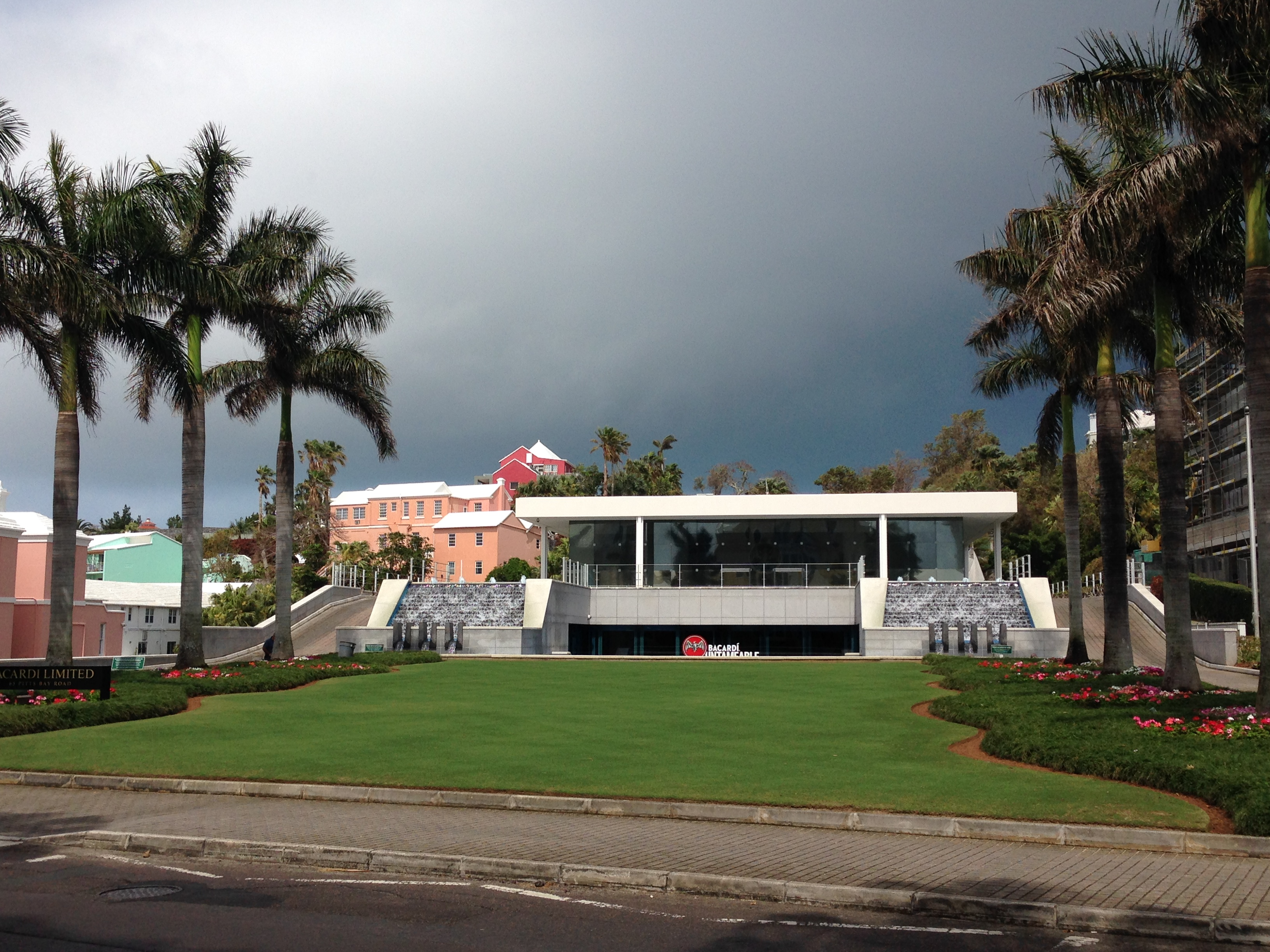
Bacardi Building, Bermuda; location of Bacardi's world headquarters

In 1999, Otto Reich, a lobbyist in Washington on behalf of Bacardí, drafted section 211 of the Omnibus Consolidated and Emergency Appropriations Act, FY1999, a bill that became known as the Bacardi Act. Section 211 denied trademark protection to products of Cuban businesses expropriated after the Cuban revolution, a provision sought by Bacardí. The act was aimed primarily at the Havana Club brand in the US. The brand was created by the José Arechabala S.A. and nationalised without compensation in the Cuban revolution, the Arechabala family left Cuba and stopped producing rum. They, therefore, allowed the US trademark registration for "Havana Club" to lapse in 1973. Taking advantage of the lapse, the Cuban government registered the mark in the US in 1976. This new law was drafted to invalidate the trademark registration. Section 211 has been challenged unsuccessfully by the Cuban government and the European Union in US courts. It was ruled illegal by the World Trade Organization (WTO) in 2001 and 2002. The US Congress has yet to re-examine the matter. The Cuban government assigned the brand to Pernod Ricard in 1993.

Bacardi rekindled the story of the Arechabala family and Havana Club in the United States when it launched the AMPARO Experience in 2018, an immersive play experience based in Miami, the city with the highest population of Cuban exiles. AMPARO "is the story of the family's entire history being erased and their heritage 'stolen'" according to playwright Vanessa Garcia.

=== Bacardi in the United States ===
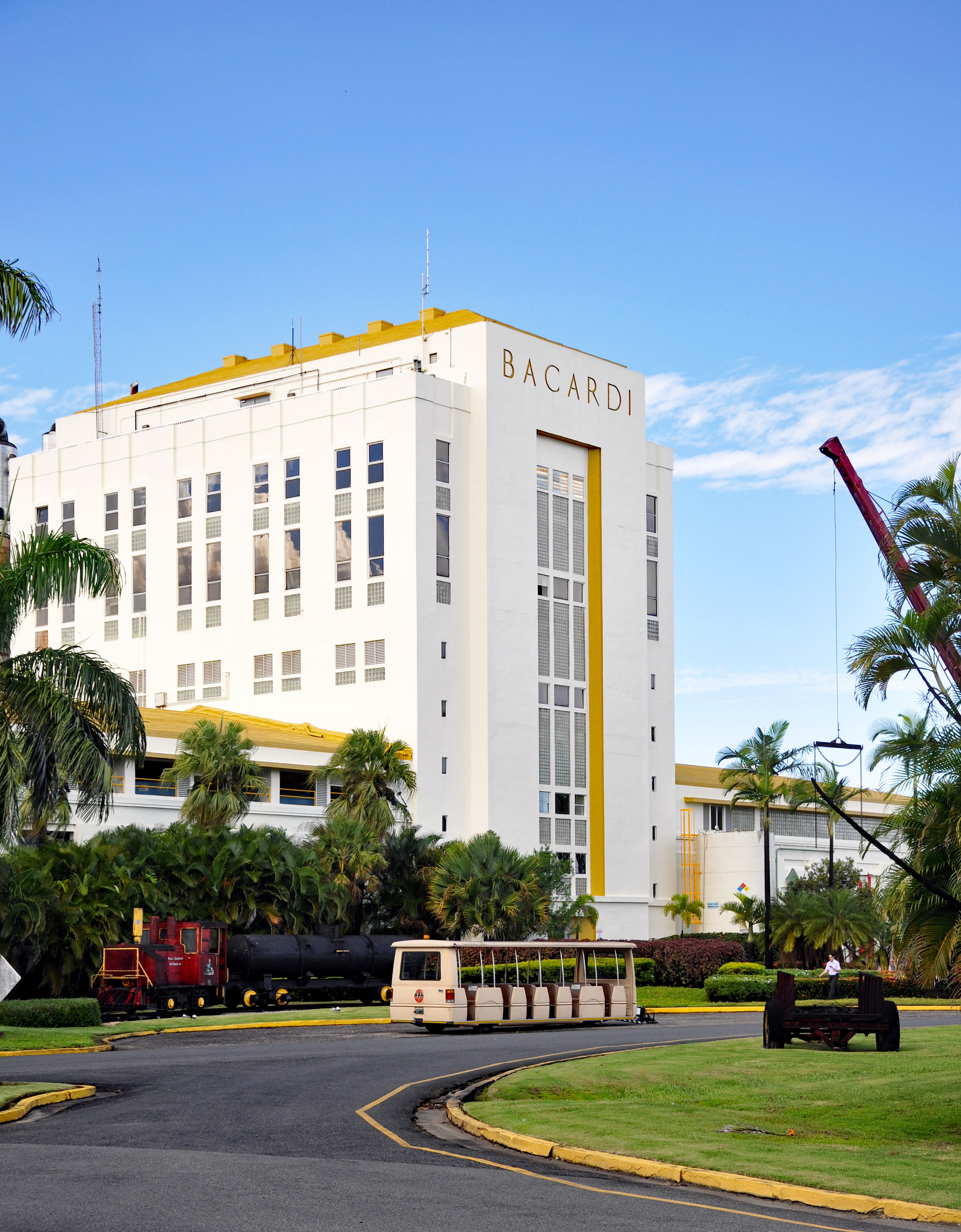
The "Cathedral of Rum" at the Bacardi distillery in Cataño, Puerto Rico, near San Juan

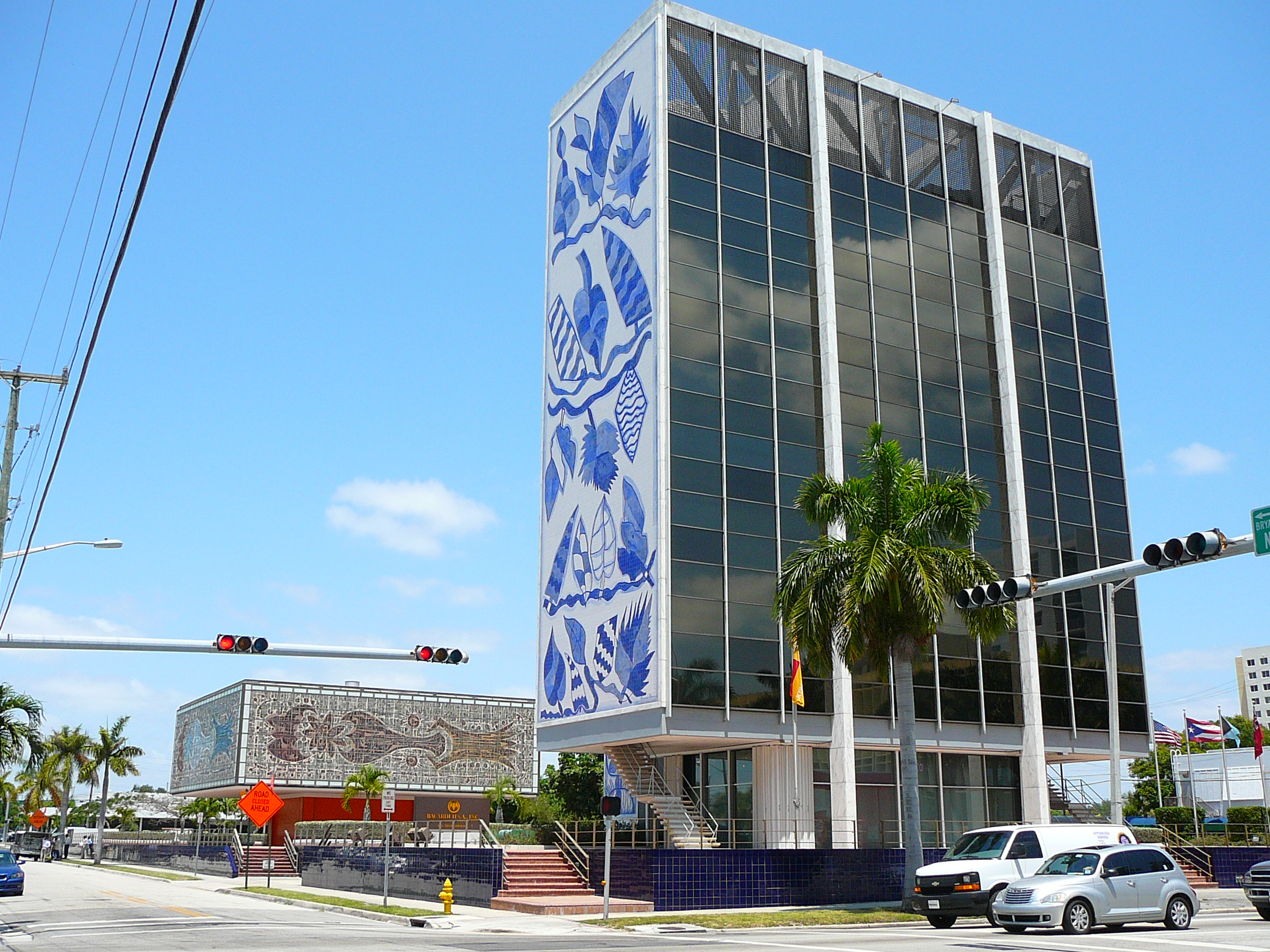
Bacardi's former U.S. headquarters in Miami. In 2006, the company moved to Coral Gables, Florida.

In 1964, Bacardi opened new US offices in Miami, Florida. Exiled Cuban architect Enrique Gutierrez created a hurricane-proof building using a system of steel cables and pulleys that allowed the building to move slightly in the event of a strong shock. The steel cables are anchored into the bedrock and extend through marble-covered shafts up to the top floor, where they are led over large pulleys. Outside, on both sides of the eight-story building, more than 28,000 tiles painted and fired by Brazilian artist Francisco Brennand, depicting abstract blue flowers, were placed on the walls according to the artist's exact specifications.

In 1973, the company commissioned the square building in the plaza. Architect Ignacio Carrera-Justiz used cantilevered construction, a style invented by Frank Lloyd Wright. Wright observed how well trees with taproots withstood hurricane-force winds. The building, raised 47 feet (14 m) off the ground around a central core, features four massive walls made of sections of inch-thick hammered glass mural tapestries designed and manufactured in France. The striking design of the annex, affectionately known as the 'Jewel Box' building, came from a painting by German artist Johannes M. Dietz.

In 2006, Bacardi USA leased a 15-story headquarters complex in Coral Gables, Florida. At the time, Bacardi had employees in seven buildings across Miami-Dade County, Florida.

Bacardi vacated its former headquarters buildings on Biscayne Boulevard in Midtown Miami. The building currently serves as the headquarters of the National YoungArts Foundation. Miami citizens began a campaign to label the buildings as "historic". The Bacardi Buildings Complex has been a locally protected historic resource since Oct. 6, 2009, when it was designated by unanimous decision by the Historic and Environmental Preservation Board.

In 2007 Chad Oppenheim, the head of Oppenheim Architecture + Design, described the Bacardi buildings as "elegant, with a Modernist [look combined with] a local flavour". In April 2009, University of Miami professor of architecture Allan Schulman said "Miami's brand is its identity as a tropical city. The Bacardi buildings are exactly the sort that resonate with our consciousness of what Miami is about."

The American headquarters is in Coral Gables, Florida.

=== Bacardi and Cuba today ===
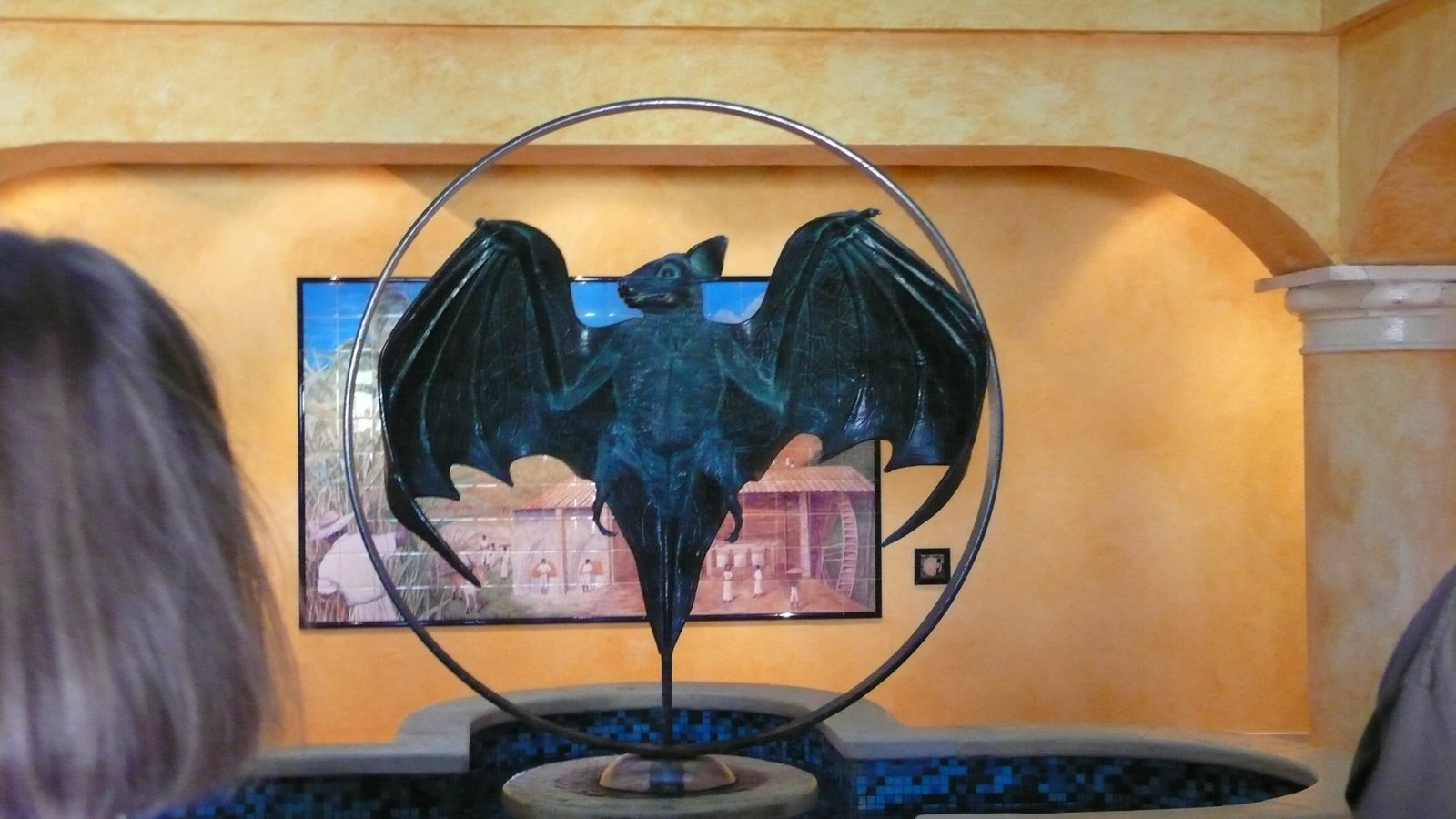
Bacardi Bat in the Bacardi Building in Cataño, Puerto Rico

Bacardi drinks are not easily found in Cuba today. The main brand of rum in Cuba is Havana Club, produced by a company that was confiscated and nationalized by the government following the revolution. Bacardi later bought the brand from the original owners, the Arechabala family. In partnership with the French company Pernod Ricard, the Cuban government sells its Havana Club products internationally, except in the United States and its territories. Bacardi created the Real Havana Club rum based on the original recipe from the Arechabala family, manufactures it in Puerto Rico, and sells it in the United States. Bacardi continues to fight in the courts, attempting to legalize their Havana Club trademark outside the United States.

=== Acquisitions ===
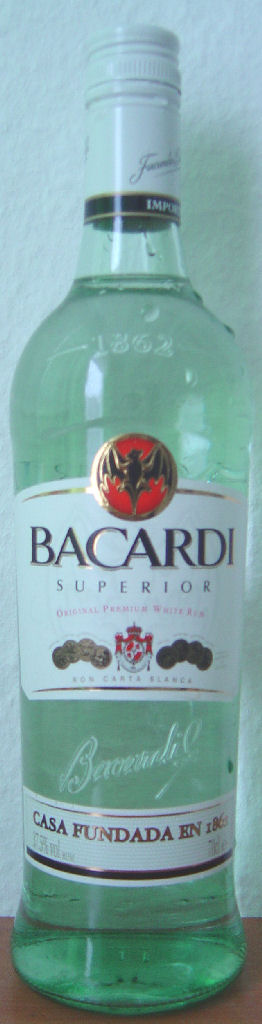
Bacardi Superior

Bacardi Limited has made numerous acquisitions to diversify away from the eponymous Bacardí rum brand.

In 1984, Bacardi purchased Lloyd's Electronics, an American consumer electronics company, for approximately US$12 million. The acquisition was structured as a strategic expansion for Bacardi into the United States consumer electronics market and a diversification of its interests beyond beverages. Earlier in the decade, Bacardi's had purchased Willmark Electronics of Puerto Rico, which had an existing procurement relationship with Lloyd's. Bacardi sold off Lloyd's in 1986.

In 1993, Bacardi merged with Martini & Rossi, the Italian producer of Martini vermouth and sparkling wines, creating the Bacardi-Martini group. Other associated brands include the Real Havana Club, Drambuie Scotch whisky liqueur, DiSaronno Amaretto, Eristoff vodka, Cazadores Tequila, B&B and Bénédictine liqueurs.

In 1998, Bacardi company acquired John Dewar & Sons, Ltd and Bombay Sapphire from Diageo for $2 billion.

In 2004, Bacardi purchased Grey Goose, a French-made vodka, from Sidney Frank for $2 billion.

In 2006 Bacardi purchased New Zealand vodka brand 42 Below.

In 2018, Bacardi purchased tequila manufacturer Patrón Spirits Company for $5.1 billion.

In 2023, Bacardi acquired the super-premium mezcal brand, Ilegal Mezcal.

In December 2023, Bacardi took majority control of Irish whiskey producer Teeling.

== Brands ==
Bacardi beverage brands include:

- Beer: Hatuey
- Cachaça: Leblon
- Cognac: Baron Otard, D'USSÉ
- Gin: Bombay Sapphire, Bosford Rose, Oxley
- Liqueur: Bénédictine, Cedlila, Get, Martini Spirito, Patrón Citrónge, St-Germain
- Mezcal: Ilegal
- Rum: Bacardí, Banks, Castillo, Facundo, Havana Club (USA only), Pyrat, Santa Teresa, Single Cane Estate
- Sparkling wine: Martini Alta Langa, Martini Asti, Martini Grandi Augur, Martini Magici Istanti, Martini Prosecco, Martini Riserva di Montellera, Martini Rosé
- Tequila: Camino Real, Cazadores, Corzo, Patrón
- Vermouth: Martini, Noilly Prat
- Vodka: Eristoff, Grey Goose, Russian Prince, Ultimat Vodka, 42 Below
- American whiskey: Angel's Envy, Stillhouse
- Irish whiskey: Teeling
- Scotch whisky:
  - Single malt Scotch whisky: Aberfeldy, Aultmore, Craigellachie, Deveron, Royal Brackla
  - Blended Scotch whisky: Dewar's, William Lawson's

== Main brand ==
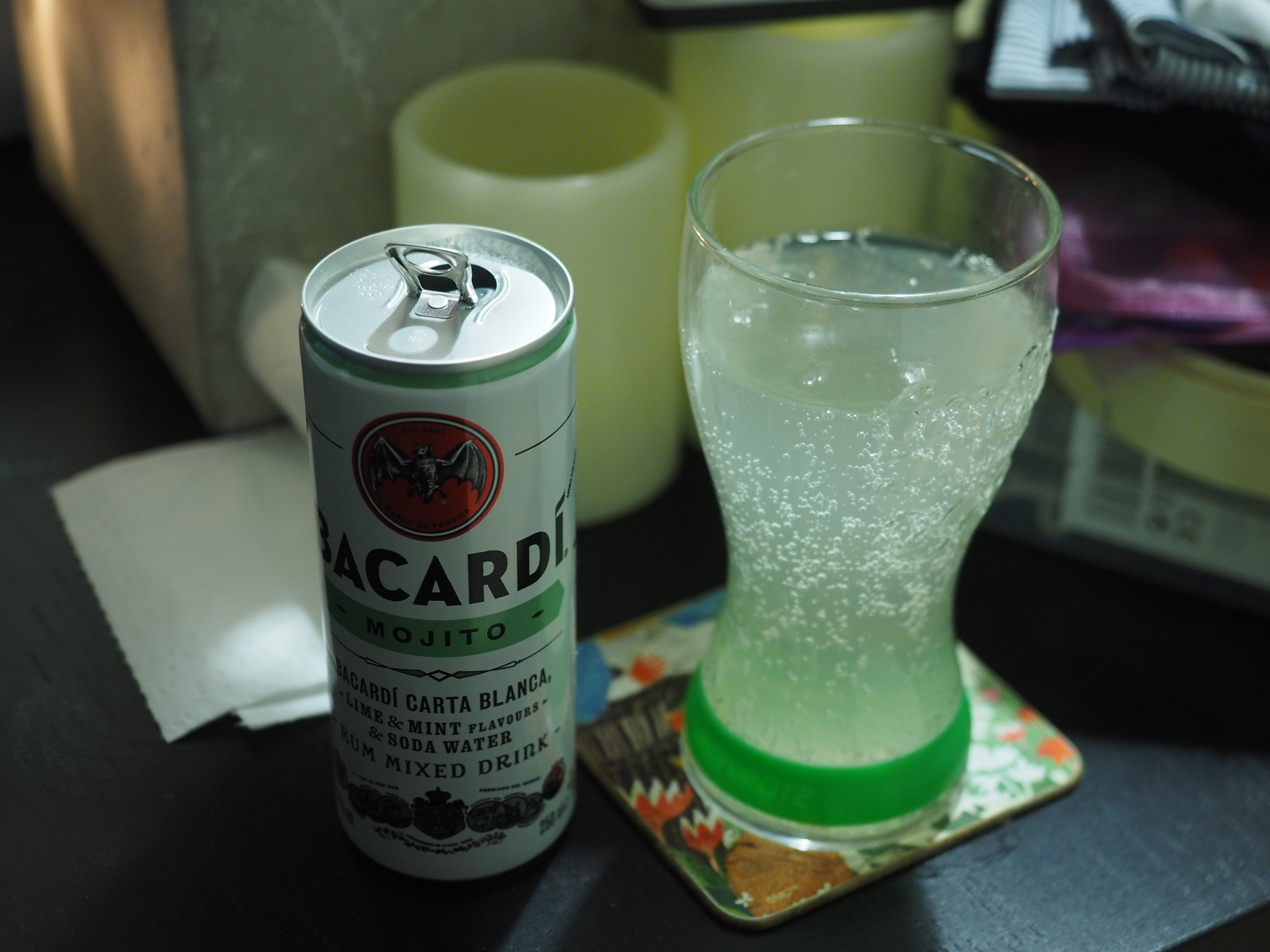
Bacardi Mojito

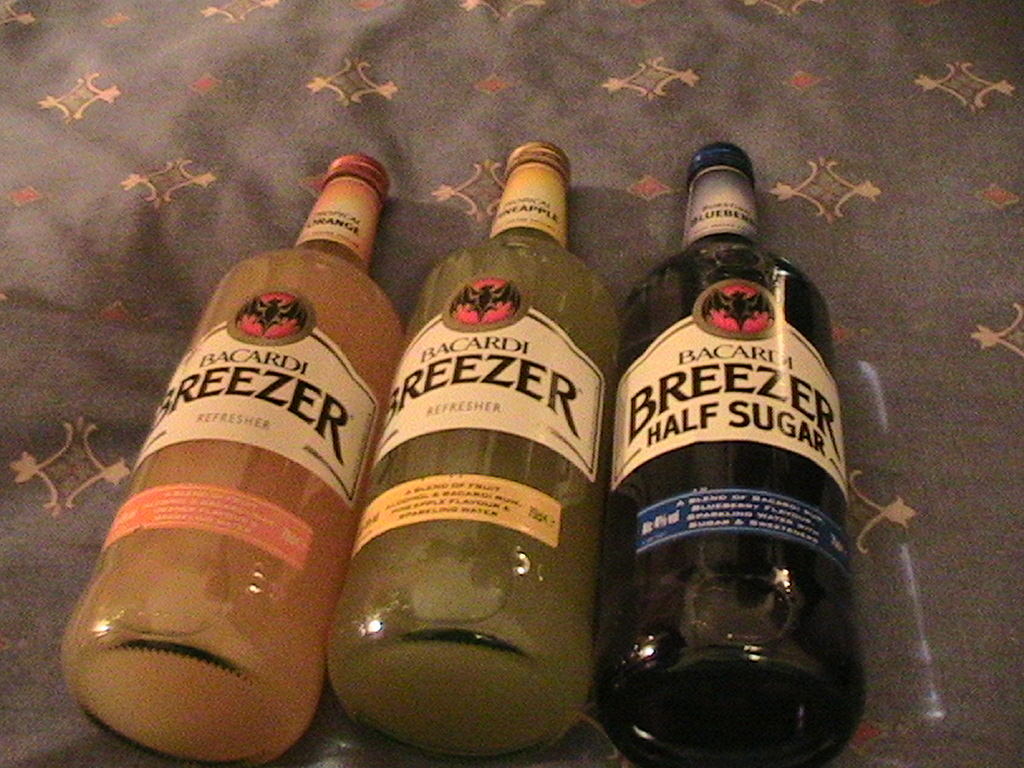
Bacardi Breezers, Orange, Pineapple and Blueberry

- Bacardi Superior
- Bacardi 8
- Bacardi Gran Reserva
- Bacardi Dark Rum
- Bacardi White Rum
- Bacardi Spiced Rum
- Bacardi Gold Rum
- Bacardi 151
- Bacardi Gold
- Bacardi Mojito
- Bacardi Breezer
- Bacardi Apple
- Bacardi Lemon
- Bacardi Carta Blanca

== Awards ==
Bacardí rums have been entered for a number of international spirits ratings awards. Several Bacardí spirits have performed notably well. In 2020, Bacardí Superior, Bacardí Gold, Bacardí Black, Bacardí Añejo Cuatro were each awarded a gold medal by the International Quality Institute Monde Selection. In addition, both Bacardí Reserva Ocho and Bacardí Gran Reserva Diez were awarded the top honor of Grand Gold quality award.

== Hemingway connection ==
Ernest Hemingway lived in Cuba from 1939 until shortly after the Cuban Revolution. He lived at Finca Vigía, in the small town of San Francisco de Paula, located very close to Bacardi's Modelo Brewery for Hatuey Beer in Cotorro, Havana.

In 1954, Compañía Ron Bacardi S.A. threw Hemingway a party when he was awarded the Nobel Prize in Literature – soon after the publication of his novel The Old Man and the Sea (1952) – in which he honored the company by mentioning its Hatuey beer. Hemingway also mentioned Bacardí and Hatuey in his novels To Have and Have Not (1937) and For Whom the Bell Tolls (1940). Guillermo Cabrera Infante wrote an account of the festivities for the periodical Ciclón, titled "El Viejo y la Marca" ("The Old Man and the Brand", a play on "El Viejo y el Mar", the book's Spanish title). In his account he described how "on one side there was a wooden stage with two streamers – Hatuey beer and Bacardi rum – on each end and a Cuban flag in the middle. Next to the stage was a bar, at which people crowded, ordering daiquiris and beer, all free." A sign at the event read "Bacardi rum welcomes the author of The Old Man and the Sea".

In his article "The Old Man and the Daiquiri", Wayne Curtis writes about how Hemingway's "home bar also held a bottle of Bacardí rum". Hemingway wrote in Islands in the Stream, "...this frozen daiquirí, so well beaten as it is, looks like the sea where the wave falls away from the bow of a ship when she is doing thirty knots."

== Mishaps ==
=== Death of Day Davis ===
On August 16, 2012 temporary worker Lawrence Daquan "Day" Davis was crushed to death when a faulty palletizer he was cleaning was activated. It was his first day on the job at the Jacksonville, Florida Bacardi Bottling facility. No lockout/tagout procedures had been implemented. An Occupational Safety and Health Administration (OSHA) investigation found 12 safety violations, and Bacardi was fined $192,000, but reached an agreement where it paid $110,000.

=== Russian invasion of Ukraine ===
When Russia invaded Ukraine, Bacardi claimed that it would halt all exports to Russia and freeze investment and advertising programs, but from June 2022 through June 2023 the company imported $169 million worth of products and tripled its profits, and through the summer of 2023 it increased its business in Russia and sought new employees for its Russian branch. When this gained international media attention, the pledge disappeared from their company website. On August 10, 2023, Ukrainian authorities added Bacardi to their list of International Sponsors of War.

== See also ==
- Lubee Bat Conservancy, an organization in Gainesville, Florida, founded by Facundo's great-grandson Luis
