= Mismo =

Cuban alcoholic beverage

- Type: Cocktail
- Ingredients: Bacardi rum, carbonated water
- Base spirit: Rum
- Served: Straight up: chilled, without ice

A mismo is an alcoholic beverage based on Bacardi rum and seltzer. In 1899, Santiago was swept by a craze for a new drink called mismo. It arose when a group of Cubans and Americans met at the Cosmopolitan Club, and one experimenting Cuban ordered a seltzer rum. The next Cuban ordered Lo mismo, which means "the same" in Spanish. The Americans, eager to explore the novel idea, also ordered Lo mismo, and found it to their liking; the next day, they returned and ordered it again. The same bartender was on duty, and served it straight away. "It spread with remarkable rapidity," reported the New York Tribune, "until now every barkeeper in Santiago knows what you are after when you ask for a 'mismo'. In fact, you rarely ever hear Barcadi rum and seltzer spoken of in any other way now."

It continued to be a popular drink in Cuba during and after Prohibition.
