= William Lawson's =

Scotch whisky brand

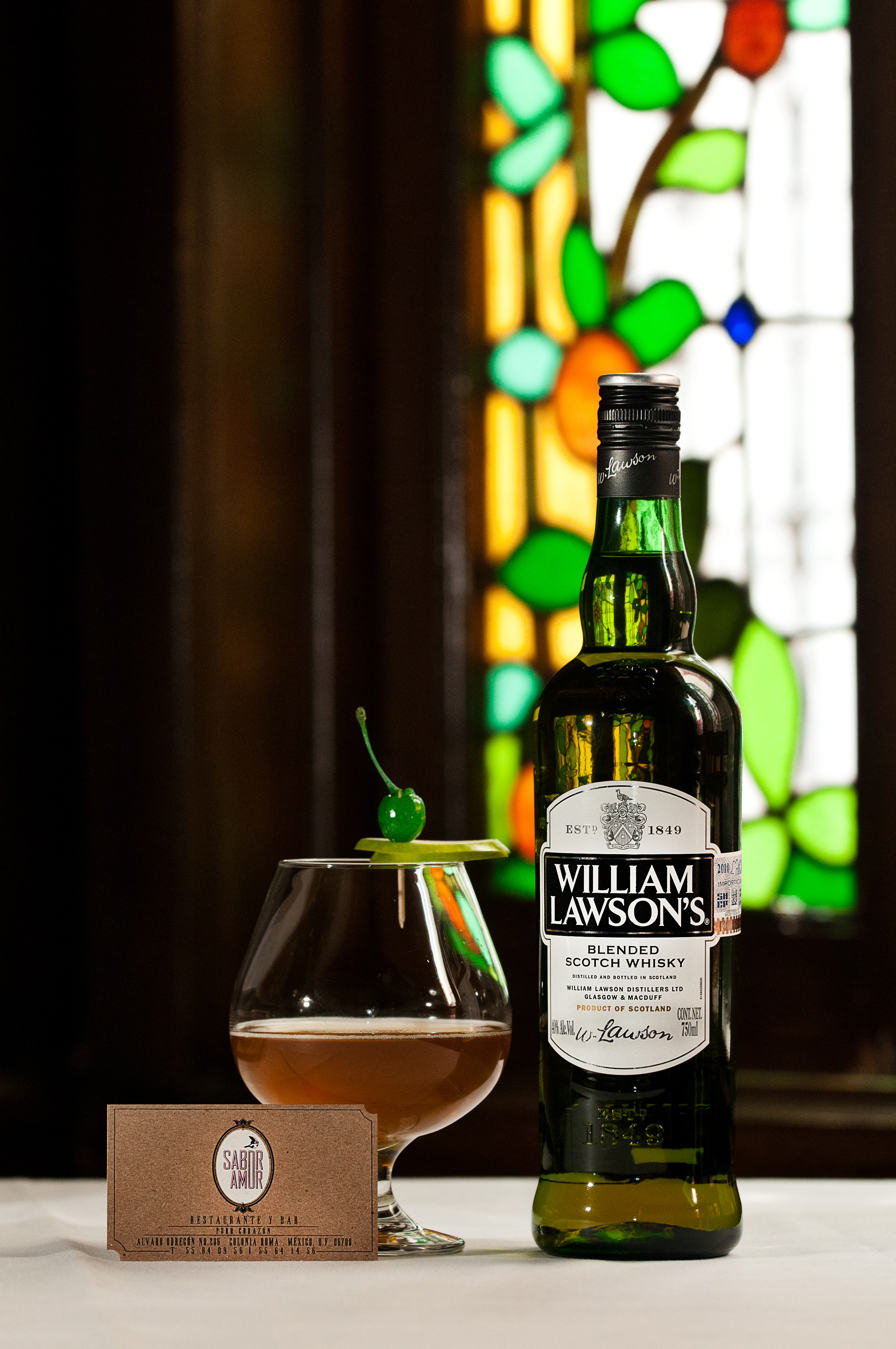
- Type: Blended Scotch whisky
- Manufacturer: John Dewar & Sons (Bacardi)
- Origin: Scotland
- Introduced: 1849
- Alcohol by volume: 40%
- Website: William Lawson's

William Lawson's is a blended Scotch whisky brand created in 1849. William Lawson's parent company, John Dewar & Sons, Ltd. is owned by Bacardi Ltd.

== History ==
William Lawson's was created in 1849 by William Lawson, a Scottish immigrant who moved to Ireland. In 1889, the brand name "W Lawson & Co" was registered by William Lawson while working as an export manager at E&J Burke in Dublin.

In 1953, Clan Munro Whisky Ltd acquired the Lawson's trademark and renamed it William Lawson's to avoid confusion with another blend.

It has been distilled and blended in the Macduff distillery alongside the Glen Deveron single malt whisky since the distillery was acquired by William Lawson Distillers Ltd in 1972.

In 1993, Bacardi acquired Martini & Rossi, which included the William Lawson's brand.

The brand is the world's 6th best-selling Scotch whisky with sales of 3.4 million cases in 2021. The brand has the best sales in France, Portugal, Spain and Mexico.
