= Eristoff =

Brand of vodka

- Manufacturer: Bacardi
- Origin: Georgia
- Introduced: 1806
- Related products: List of vodkas
- Website: www.eristoff.com

Eristoff Vodka (pronounced air-wrist-off; Georgian: Georgian: ერისთავი, transliterated Eristavi) is a brand of vodka that originated in Georgia and was first created for Prince Eristavi of Duchy of Racha in 1806. Eristoff vodka is triple distilled and then charcoal filtered, a technique first established in 18th century Russia.

The Eristoff logo of a wolf howling at a crescent moon represents the Persian name for Georgia, Gorjestan, meaning "land of the wolf".

== History ==
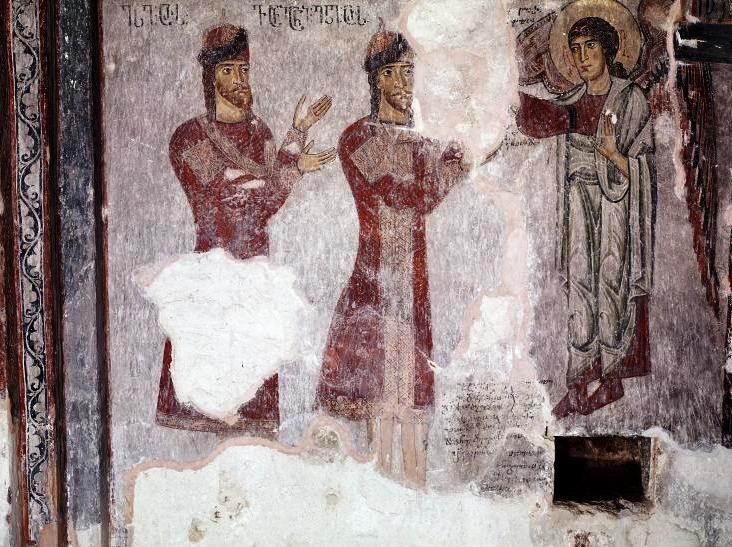
Eristavs of Duchy of Racha

The original Georgian version of the name, Eristoff or Eristov, was Eristavi (ერისთავი). The title means ‘head of the nation’ but translates more accurately as ‘head of a military force’. By the 19th century, five noble families, each representing a different part of Georgia, were using the name Eristhavi. Prince Ivane Eristoff, who first created Eristoff vodka in 1806, was from the northwest province of Racha.

After Ivane’s great-grandson, Prince Alexander Constantine Eristoff, moved from Georgia to Saint Petersburg, he went on to eventually reach the rank of Colonel in the Imperial Guard.

After the Soviet takeover, the Eristovs left Georgia. One Eristavi from America served as the new Jersey state treasurer. Descendants resumed bottling in Milan under licence to Martini & Rossi during the 1960s.

After Martini & Rossi merged with Bacardi in 1993, Eristoff joined the group’s global portfolio and switched large-scale production to Bacardi-Martini’s facility in Beaucaire, France.

== Flavours ==
Eristoff is available in five flavours:

- Eristoff Red: sloe berry flavour (Domi wodka)
- Eristoff Black: wild berry flavour
- Eristoff Pink: wild strawberry flavour
- Eristoff Lime: lime flavour
- Eristoff Blue: raspberry and pineapple flavour

== Land of the Wolf ==
"Land of the Wolf" is the new global advertising campaign for Eristoff. The campaign, which includes a 60-second cinema advertisement, takes its inspiration from legends and folklore that surround the wolf.

== Accolades ==
The Eristoff flagship (unflavored) vodka was given Eristoff scores of 90–94 in the years between 2011 and 2014 by the Beverage Testing Institute. As of September 2014, Proof66 listed Eristoff among its Top 20 vodkas.

== See also ==
- Nemiroff
- Absolut Vodka
