= John Dewar & Sons =

Alcoholic beverages company

John Dewar & Sons, Ltd.
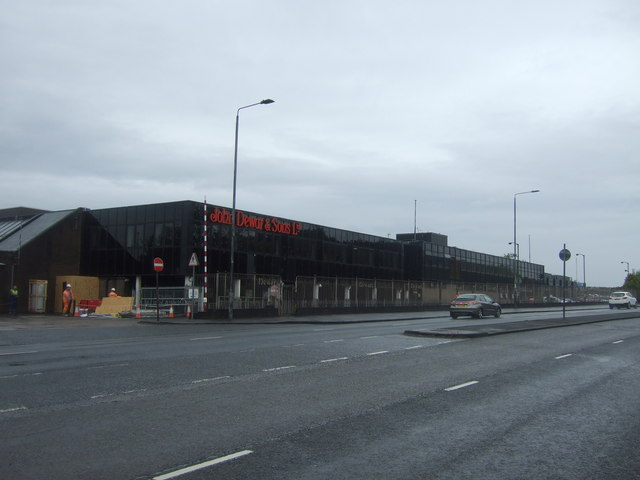
- Company type: Public
- Industry: Drink industry
- Founded: 1846
- Fate: Acquired
- Headquarters: Perth, Scotland
- Products: Scotch whisky
- Parent: Bacardi Limited

John Dewar & Sons, Ltd. is a Scottish company that distills Scotch whisky. It is a subsidiary of Bacardi.

== History ==
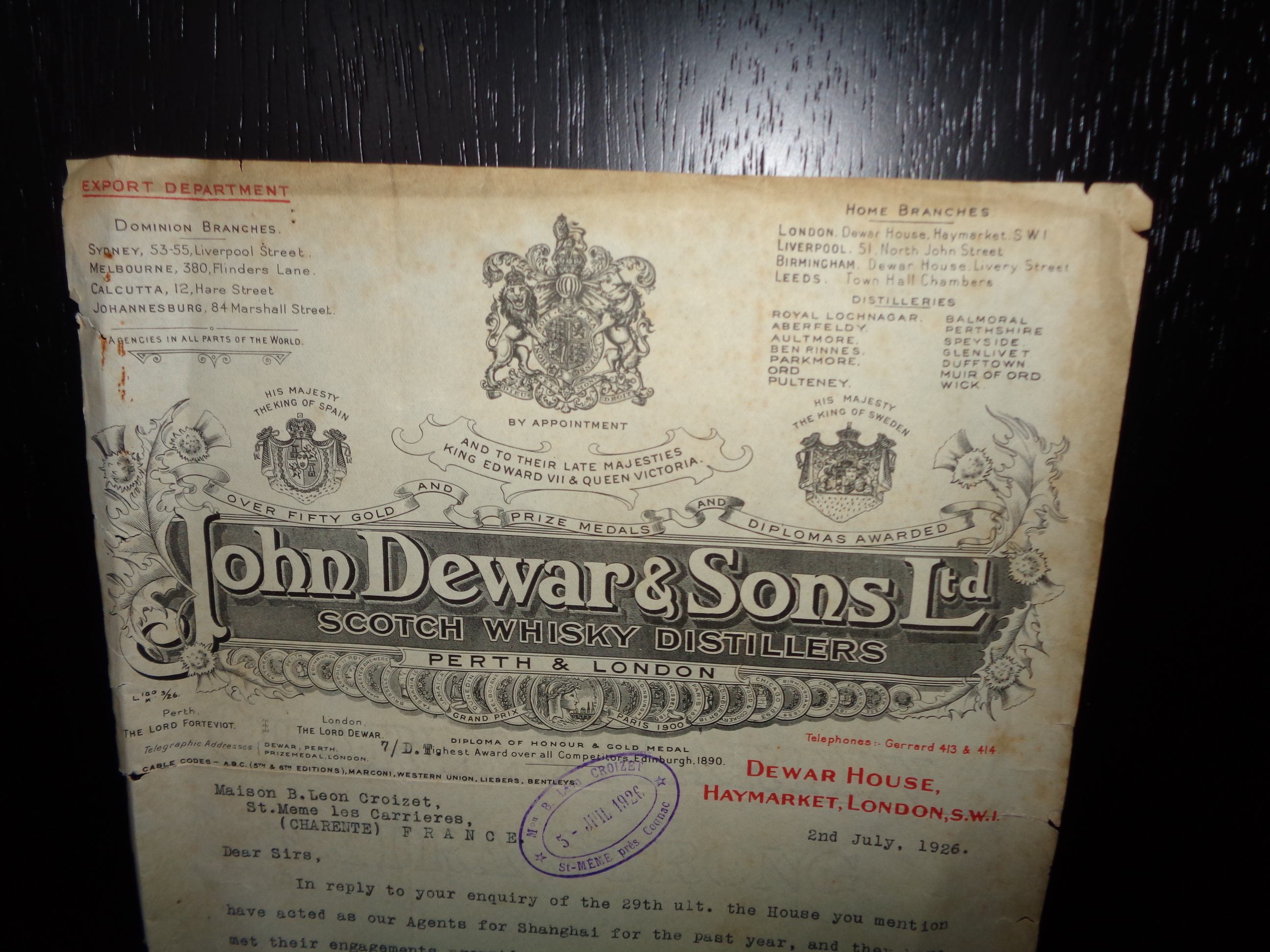
John Dewar & Sons 1926 client correspondence with watermark on document

John Dewar was born in 1825 in the town of Auchterarder, Scotland. He began his career in the whisky trade in the early 1840s.

John Dewar & Sons was officially established by John Dewar and his two sons, John Alexander Dewar and James Dewar, in Perth, Scotland. Initially, the company operated as a whisky blender.

In 1890, the company gained significant recognition for its blended whisky, particularly "Dewar's White Label", which became the company's flagship product.

In 1900, Dewar's expanded its reach internationally, particularly in the United States, by leveraging innovative marketing techniques. Dewar's rose to prominence in the United States when Andrew Carnegie requested a small keg of Dewar's Scotch whisky be sent to the White House for President James Garfield's inauguration. Carnegie also sent the same gift to President Benjamin Harrison on his inauguration eight years later.

In 1920 the company faced challenges during Prohibition in the US, but it adapted by focusing on other markets and maintaining quality.

The company joined Distillers Company in 1925 as part of Buchanan-Dewar.

Distillers Company was acquired by Guinness in 1986. Guinness merged with Grand Metropolitan to form Diageo in 1997.

In 1998, Diageo sold John Dewar & Sons, Ltd. to Bacardi.

== Distilleries ==
John Dewar & Sons, Ltd., owns five whisky distilleries in Scotland:

- Aberfeldy
- Aultmore
- Craigellachie
- Macduff
- Royal Brackla

== Brands ==
John Dewar & Sons brands:

- Single malt Scotch whisky: Aberfeldy, Aultmore, Craigellachie, Deveron, Royal Brackla
- Blended Scotch whisky: Dewar's, William Lawson's
