= D'USSÉ =

French cognac brand

- Type: Private
- Industry: Beverage
- Products: D'USSÉ VSOP (Very Superior Old Pale) and D'USSÉ XO (Extra Old)
- Website: www.dusse.com

D'USSÉ is a brand of cognac owned by Bacardi. It is made at the Château du Cognac in Cognac, France. D'USSÉ produces two cognacs: D'USSÉ VSOP and D'USSÉ XO. D'USSÉ VSOP is aged at least 4.5 years in the Château de Cognac cellars. D'USSÉ Cognac was conceived by the cellar master Michel Casavecchia. The Château du Cognac is a 200-year-old venue and is one of the oldest Cognac houses in France.
