= Royal Brackla distillery =

Whisky distillery in Highland, Scotland

Coordinates: 57°32′22.89″N 3°54′19.68″W

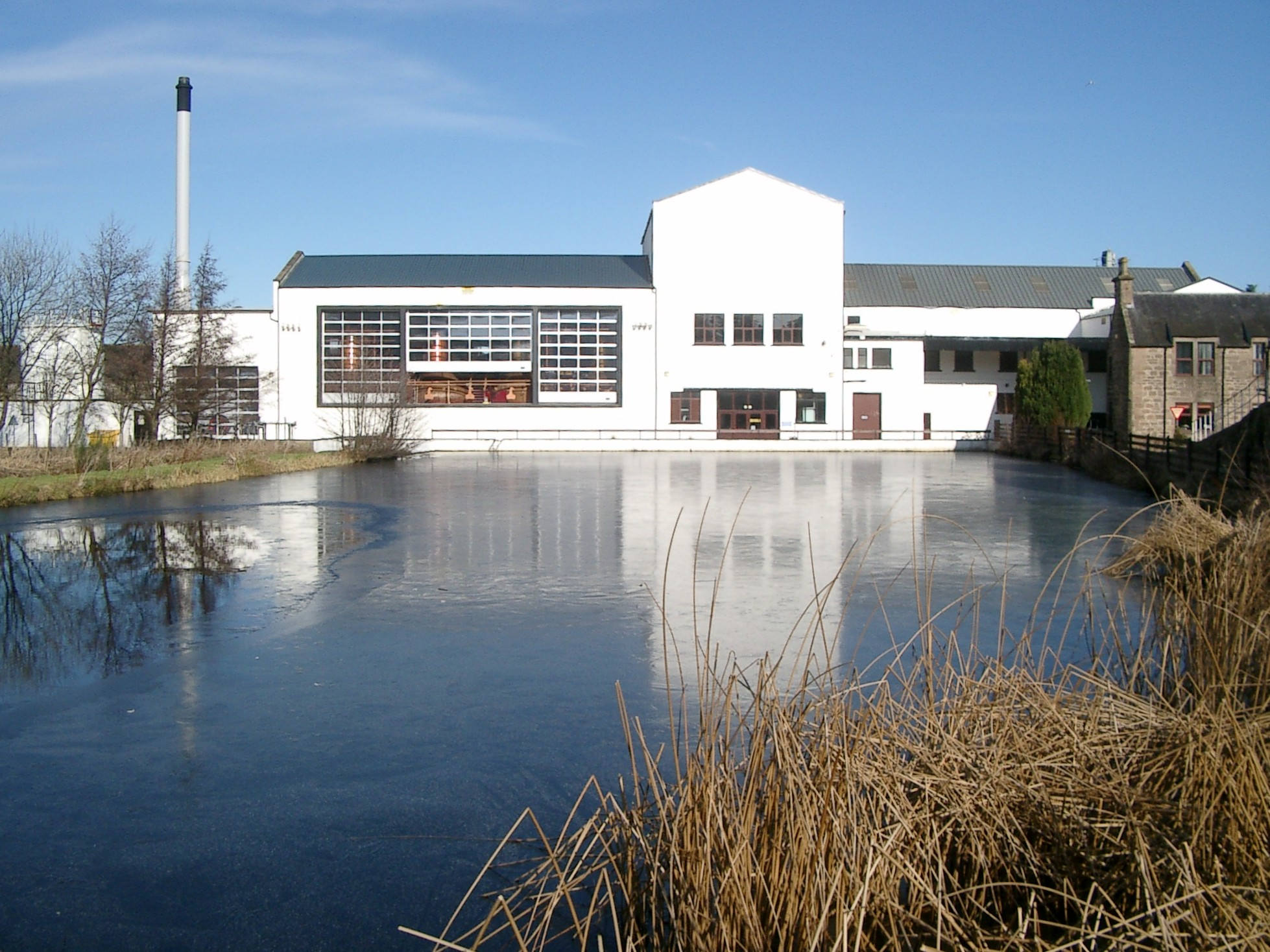

Region: Highland
- Location: Cawdor Estate, near Nairn, Highland
- Owner: John Dewar & Sons (Bacardi)
- Founded: 1812
- Status: Operational
- Water source: Cawdor Burn, Cursack Springs and Airfield supply
- No. of stills: 2 wash stills, 2 spirit stills
- Capacity: 3,500,000 litres (770,000 imp gal)

Royal Brackla distillery is a Highland single malt Scotch whisky distillery on the Cawdor Estate, near Nairn in Scotland.

== History ==
The Brackla distillery was built in 1812 by Captain William Fraser of Brackla House on the estate of Cawdor Castle. In 1833 Brackla Distillery became the first whisky distillery to be granted a royal warrant by King William IV. Royal Brackla is one of three distilleries to bear the name 'Royal', the others being the active distillery Royal Lochnagar and the demolished distillery Glenury Royal. Queen Victoria renewed Brackla's royal warrant in 1838.

In 1839 William Fraser & Co took over the distillery and it was passed from William Fraser to his son Robert Fraser in 1852. It was in 1878 that Robert Fraser disposed of the distillery to the firm Robert Fraser & Co and in 1879 the company was reconstructed as the Brackla Distillery Co Ltd.

The 1897 prospectus reveals that the capital of the company was £100,000, divided into 40,000 preference and 60,000 ordinary shares. The Directors of the company were James Anderson, Wine Merchant, Leith, Andrew Usher of Northfield, John Usher of Norton and Walter C. Newbigging, distiller at Brackla. The Prospectus also reported:

"Brackla's whisky has long been known as one of the best Highland malt whiskies in the market. The demand for it has for years been much in excess of the supply, and in order to cope with this demand considerable additions have recently been made to the distillery."

The distillery and warehouse, at this time, was on a site of over 13 acres, this was held under lease from the Earl of Cawdor.

In 1919 John Mitchel and James Leith of Aberdeen acquired the company but then sold it in 1926 to John Bisset & Co Ltd of Leith. They were taken over by the Distillers Company Ltd in 1943.

Due to restrictions on the use of barley for distilling during the Second World War a majority of Scotch Whisky distilleries closed, including the Royal Brackla Distillery from 1943 until 1945. An airfield was built beside the distillery in 1940, to provide a landing ground for operational training and air gunnery.

1964 saw the distillery close its doors again until 1966, this was due to major reconstruction and re-planning. The traditional method of coal-firing the stills by hand was changed to internal heating by steam generated from a coal-fired boiler. In 1965 an underground supply of water, created during the Second World War for an airfield, was acquired and used for cooling spirit vapour.

In 1970, the distillery was expanded by adding a second pair of stills and converting the coal-fired boiler to oil-fired. New racked warehouses were built in 1975 to replace the older traditional warehouses that were still in use at the time.

The Royal Brackla Distillery closed again in 1985. The casks of whisky remained on site in the warehouses where they continued to mature and be used for blending, as required by the owners. The distillery reopened in 1991.

In 1998, the distillery started to be operated by John Dewar & Sons, a subsidiary of Bacardi.

In 2019, Bacardi relaunch Royal Brackla single malts, consisting of Royal Brackla 12 Years Old finished in Oloroso sherry casks, Royal Brackla 18 Years Old finished in Palo Cortado Sherry casks and Royal Brackla 21 Years Old finished in Oloroso, Palo Cortado and Pedro Ximénez sherry casks.

== Methods of production ==
Royal Brackla has a mash tun of 12.5 tonnes (12.3 LT) and eight wash backs with a total volume of 480,000 litres (110,000 imp gal). Cawdor Burn has been the constant water supply for Royal Brackla, with the Cursack Springs being used for mashing.

The distillery uses four stills to produce its whisky, two wash stills with a combined capacity of 42,000 litres (9,200 imp gal)i and two spirit stills that have combined capacity of 42,000 litres. The fermentation process lasts for a total of 70 hours and is followed by the distillation process. Tall Royal Brackla stills, designed to allow plenty of reflux, are operated slowly in the distillation process to smooth the blend to maximise copper contact and produce a light spirit. The final stage is maturation and this takes place in oak casks.

== Proprietary bottlings ==
1991: To commemorate the re-opening of Royal Brackla Distillery, a special 60-year-old Royal Brackla single malt was released. It was claimed the cask (from 1924) was discovered in a warehouse in 1984. 40%, 70cl.

1993: Royal Brackla was released as a 10-year-old in the Flora and Fauna series, produced by United Distillers. The label featured a small bird called a siskin. 43%, 70cl.

1998: Part of United Distillers Rare Malts Collection included a bottling of Royal Brackla at 20 years old. It was distilled in 1978 and was cask strength. 50.8%, 70cl.

1999: John Dewar & Sons Ltd released a minor bottling of Royal Brackla with a burgundy label and no age statement. 40%, 70cl.

2003: A limited edition 25-year-old was released for the keepers of the Quaich, each label signed by Tom Aitken, John Dewar & Sons' sixth Master Blender. 43%, 70cl.

2004: Dewar's released the 10-year-old single malt bottling in order to make a small amount of the whisky available to the public. 40%, 70cl.

== Promotion ==
The Caledonian Mercury, 13 February 1826 reported:

There was shipped at Inverness on Thursday, on board the George of Inverness, for different houses in London, upwards of 900 gallons of genuine malt spirits, from the Brackla Distillery and supposed to be the first ever shipped at that port by the permission of government – Inverness journal.

The Newcastle Courant, 18 December 1830 reported:

Barley WANTED for Royal Brackla Distillery, 1000 Quarters of Fine MALTING BARLEY, and to be delivered at the Harbour of Nairn viz: - 300 Quarters in all December 1830; 300 Quarters in April; and 400 quarters in July 1831. The grain will require to be of the best Malting Quality. Samples, with the Weight per Bushel, to be sent to the Address of Captain Fraser, Brackla, Nairn; or to the agent in Edinburgh, William Tait, 12 Infirmary Street. All letters to be Post-paid – Inverness 9 December 1830.

The Morning Chronicle, 20 January 1835 reported:

His Majesty having been pleased to distinguish this 'by his Royal Command to supply his establishment' has placed this whisky first on the List of British Spirits, and when known should in truth be termed 'The Drink Divine' – only to be had of the importers, Graham & Co, New Road, facing Mary-la-bone Workhouse.

The Morning Post, 7 May 1836 reported:

THE KING'S OWN WHISKY, distilled expressly for the use of his Majesty at Fraser's Royal Brackla Distillery, Inverness, is perhaps the only malt spirit which proves alike congenial to the palate and constitution of connaisseurs of every country. It is peat-flavoured, but far from rank - strong, but not fiery, and produces the most exquisite Punch or Toddy. As consignees, we offer the KING'S OWN WHISKY to the Trade at the mere commission of the invoice price; and to enable private families to detect spurious fabrication, which may be imposed upon them, we undertake on all occasions to draw this fine spirit from the original Highland puncheons, at 20s per imperial gallon; to bottle it at 44s per dozen, bottles inclusive, or (for more general accommodation) to supply single sealed bottles at 3s 9d each. Orders by post or otherwise, will meet immediate attention from HENRY BRETT and CO., Wine and Brandy Merchants, No 139. Holborn-bars.

== See also ==
- Whisky
- Scotch whisky
- List of whisky brands
- List of distilleries in Scotland
