= Corzo =

Brand of tequila

Corzo is a brand of tequila named in honor of the town of Chiapa de Corzo, Chiapas. The town was built on the highland battleground where the last Native Americans opposed the Spanish Conquistadors. Due to an ancestral link to the Soctón, the brand's founding master distiller used the name Corzo out of respect for these Indigenous people. Corzo is popular in tequila bars.

== Varieties ==
Corzo produces three types of tequila: a Silver, a Reposado, and an Anejo. All three are made from 100% Agave.

== Production ==
Corzo is the only tequila that uses sparging, a process which introduces microscopic air bubbles before bottling and allows the tequila to breathe. All three varieties of Corzo are produced using a triple distillation.

== Rankings ==
Wine Enthusiast Magazine awarded 93 points out of 100, a particularly high score.
