= Macduff distillery =

Whisky distillery in Aberdeenshire, Scotland

Coordinates: 57°39′28.37″N 2°30′45.90″W

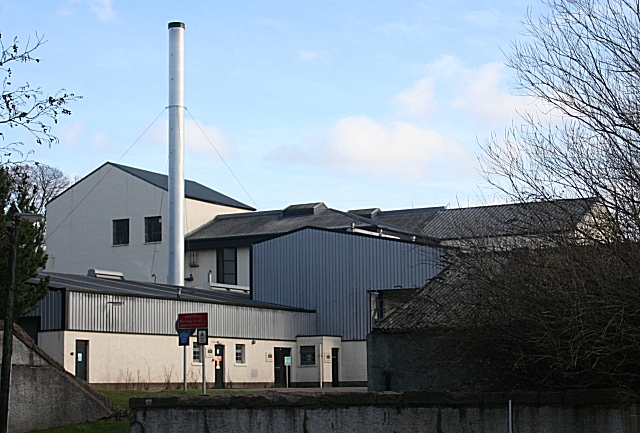

Region: Highland
- Location: Macduff
- Owner: John Dewar & Sons (Bacardi)
- Founded: 1960
- Status: Operational
- Water source: Local
- No. of stills: 2 wash stills 3 spirit stills
- Capacity: 2,400,000 litres of alcohol per annum

Glen Deveron/Macduff
- Type: Single malt
- ABV: 40%

The Macduff distillery is a single malt Scotch whisky distillery in Macduff, Aberdeenshire in the Highland whisky producing area of Scotland.

== History ==
The Macduff Distillery Company was founded in 1960 by the Macduff Distillers Ltd. In 1972, Macduff was acquired by William Lawson Distillers. It became part of the Martini & Rossi corporation in 1980.

In 1992, Martini & Rossi were acquired by the Bacardi Corporation. Bacardi put their subsidiary John Dewar & Sons in charge of the Macduff distillery. Macduff is a major component in their blends like William Lawson.

The distillery produces single malt whisky called "The Deveron" as 10, 12 and 18 year old expressions. It supports local groups such as the Portsoy 75 Club.
