= Santa Teresa (rum) =

Venezuelan rum producer brand

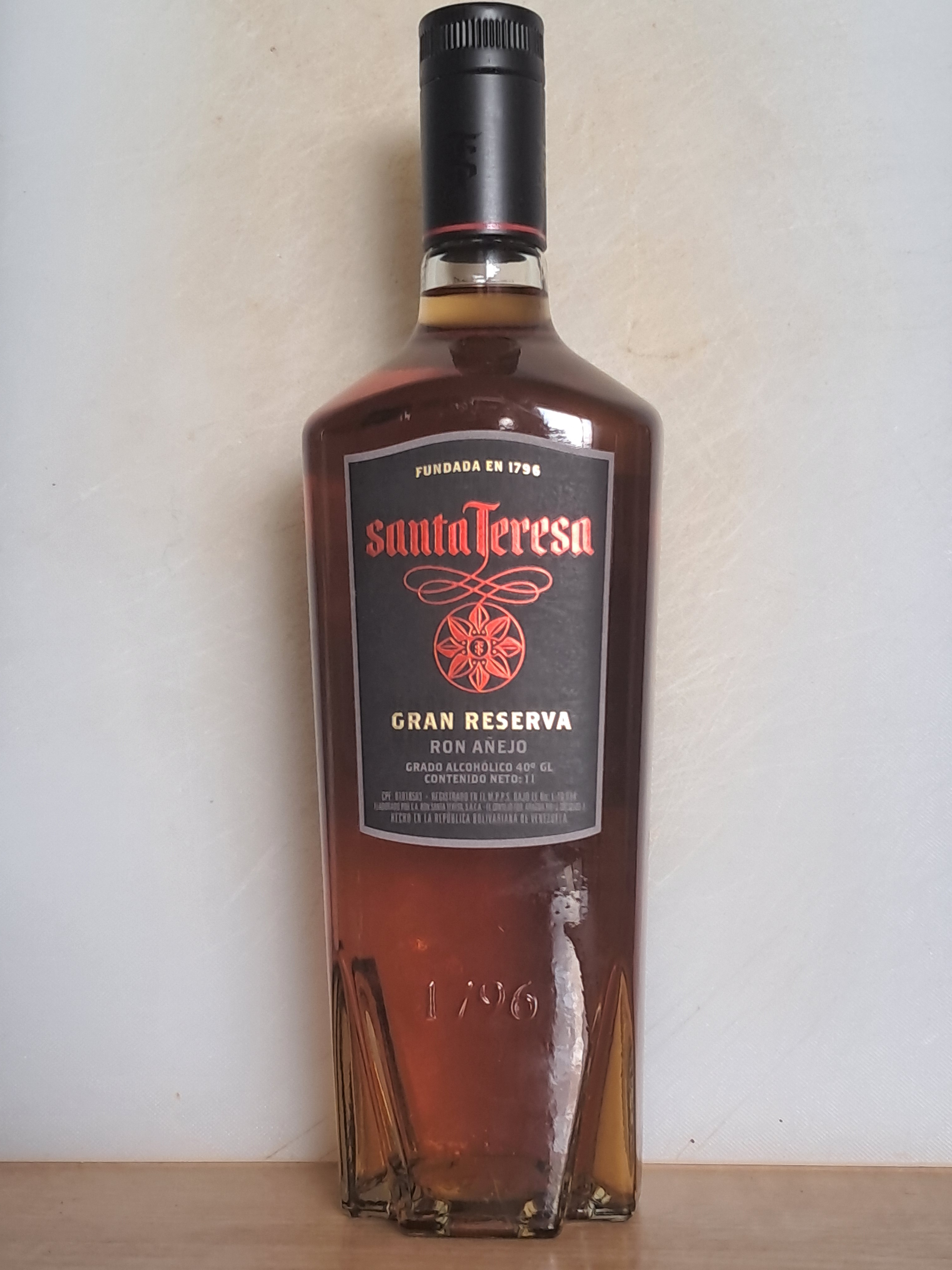
"GRAN RESERVA": Traditional variety of Santa Teresa rum

Ron Santa Teresa (IBC: RST) is a Venezuela rum brand and producer. Production is based at a sugar plantation which has been in operation since colonial times. It claims to be the first brand of rum to be registered in Venezuela and has more than two hundred years of tradition in crafting aged rums.

The company’s headquarters are located at the Santa Teresa Estate, founded in 1796 by Earl Martín Tovar Ponte, which today functions as an agro-industrial, tourism, and sports complex. Its current president is the Venezuelan businessman Alberto C. Vollmer, who belongs to the fifth generation of the family dedicated to the rum production in Venezuela. Ron Santa Teresa is known not only for its products but also for its social programs through the Santa Teresa Foundation, such as Proyecto Alcatraz, Rugby Santa Teresa and Proyecto Casas Blancas.

== History ==
By the end of the 16th century, sugar cane was already being grown in the valleys of what is now Aragua state, in northern Venezuela. In 1796, Count Martín Tovar Ponte, a signer of the Venezuelan Act of Independence, named the estate in honor of the patroness “Santa Thereza”. After the property suffered damage caused by the royalist forces during the War of Independence, a young man of German descent, Gustav Julius Vollmer Ribas, grandson of the general José Félix Ribas, purchased the estate. Taking advantage of the proximity of the Great Venezuela Railway, he scaled up rum production in the 1890s.

Starting from 1989, the estate began offering guided tours of the property to explain the rum-making process and showcase its facilities. Among the attractions are "The Rum Route", which includes the "Tovar House", the "Rum Museum", the "Private Cellar", the "Solitary Hatchery", the La Guadalupe sector, the coffee roaster, the cane fields, the "Aragua Cross", the distillery, the bottling plant and the former train station of El Consejo.

== Project Alcatraz Rugby ==
Proyecto Alcatraz is a rehabilitation program for youth with behavior problems that has succeeded in disbanding at least ten gangs without the use of violence. The program began in 2003, after a robbery at the company in which a security guard was nearly killed. One of the assailants was captured and offered the chance to work for the company for three months as his sentence. Another member was later captured and given the same offer, until a total of twenty-two members of the gang joined; during the process, they were also taught to read and write. Although the initial idea was simply for the gang members to work on the estate, the company’s owner, Alberto Vollmer, proposed rehabilitating them through rugby. The program has had more than two hundred participants and has since expanded to include both a rugby school and a community program, with at least two thousand young people across the state now training in rugby as a pathway away from crime.
