= Aberfeldy distillery =

Whisky distillery in Scotland

Coordinates: 56°37′28″N 3°50′59″W

Aberfeldy Distillery

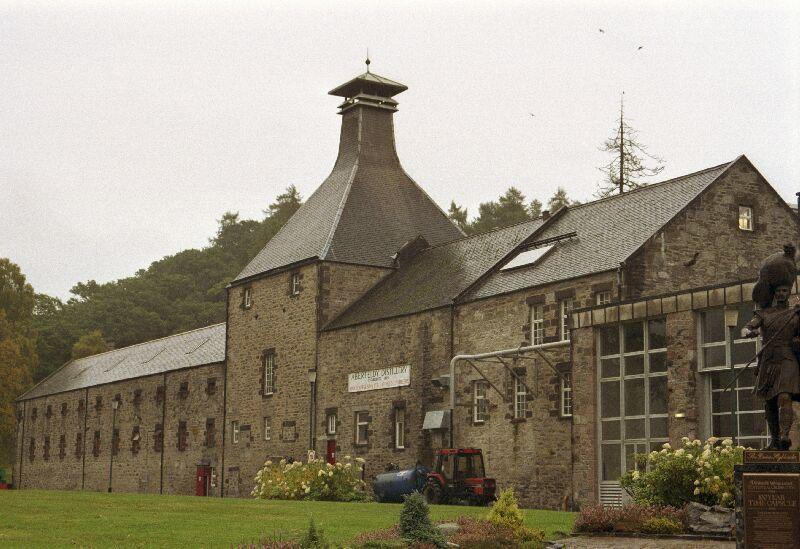

Region: Highland
- Location: Aberfeldy, Perthshire PH15 2EB, Scotland, United Kingdom
- Owner: John Dewar & Sons (Bacardi)
- Founded: 1896; 130 years ago
- Status: Operational
- Water source: hiPitilie Burn
- No. of stills: 2 wash stills 2 spirit stills
- Capacity: 3,500,000 litres

Aberfeldy
- Type: Single malt
- Age(s): 12 Years
- Cask type(s): American White Oak, Ex-Bourbon Casks (Main)
- ABV: 40% - 43%
- Age(s): 18 Years
- Cask type(s): American White Oak, Ex-Bourbon Casks (Main)
- ABV: 43%

Listed Building – Category B
- Official name: Dunkeld Road, Aberfeldy Distillery and Dewar's World Of Whisky Including Stalk and Ancillary Buildings
- Designated: 5 August 2002
- Reference no.: LB48846

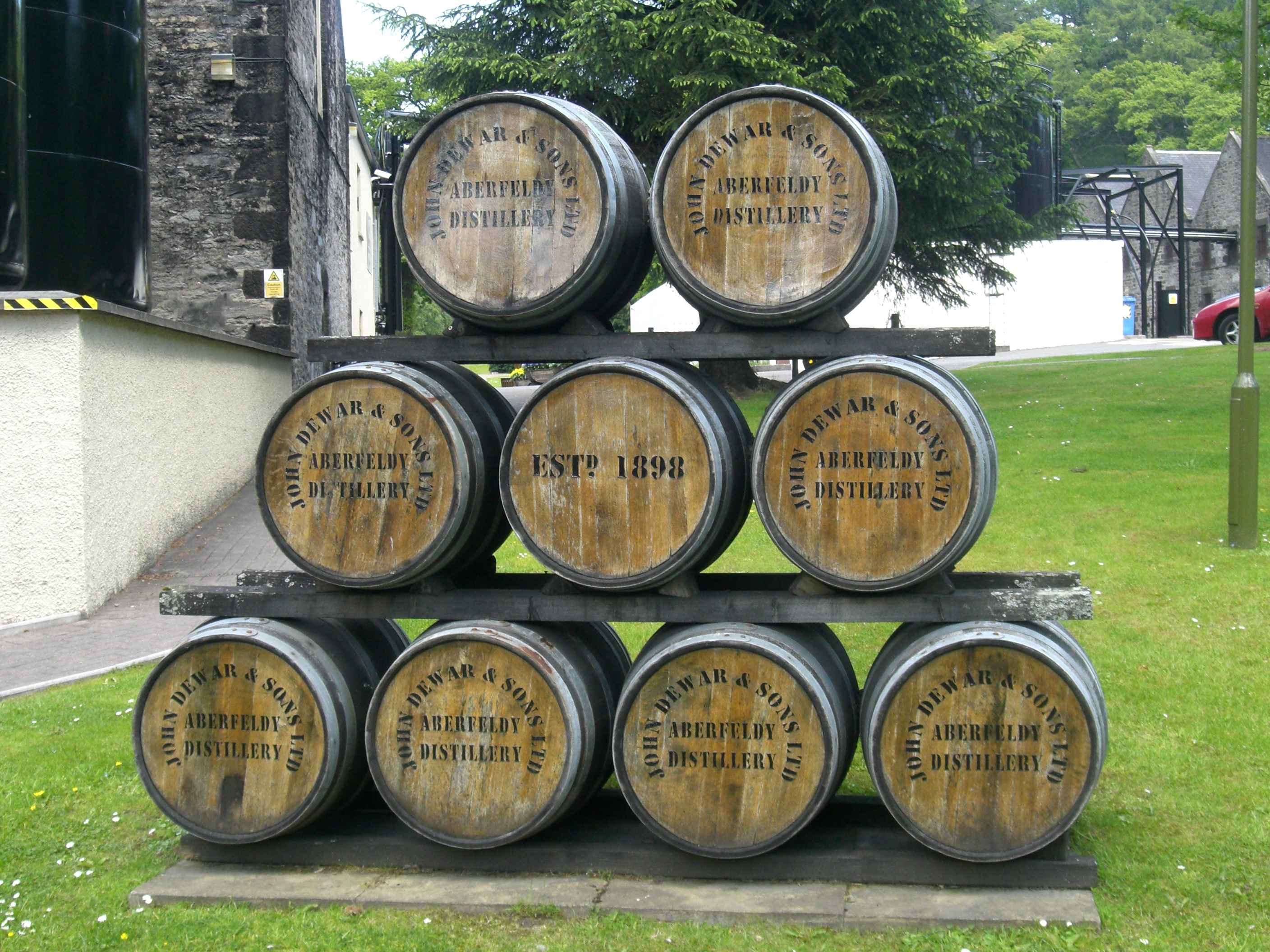
Aberfeldy casks

Aberfeldy distillery is a single malt Scotch whisky distillery in Scotland.

== History ==
Aberfeldy Distillery was founded by John Dewar & Sons, Ltd. in 1896, and opened in 1898. The distillery is located on the eastern outskirts of Aberfeldy, on the southern bank of the upper Tay.

The demand for barley as a basic foodstuff during World War I led to the distillery being closed from 1917 to 1919. The Second World War also caused barley supplies to be cut, and the distillery was again forced to shut down for some of this period. Supply to final markets was kept up by reducing the period whisky was laid up from 7 years to 3. In 1925, the distillery passed to The Distillers Company when Dewars amalgamated with it.

In 1972 the distillery was enlarged, and the old stills were replaced by four new steam heated stills. Ownership later passed to Grand Metropolitan, which became Diageo in 1997. In 1999, an Aberfeldy 12 Year Old Single Malt brand was introduced.

In 2000, a new distillery visitor center named "Dewar's World of Whisky" was opened at a cost of £3 million. The Earl of Elgin opened the facility, it being designed for marketing Aberfeldy products and educating the public about the process of distillation and history of the Dewar's brand.

Aberfeldy is the largest malt whisky component of Dewar's Blended Whisky.

== The distillery ==
Aberfeldy is situated in the centre of Scotland, some five miles east of Loch Tay and the town of Kenmore and about eight miles south of Loch Tummel. Aberfeldy relies on the fresh water stream Pitilie Burn, which runs alongside the distillery. Aberfeldy is the only distillery in Scotland to use these waters.

The area contains historical landmarks, such as Kenmore Bridge. This was built by the 3rd Earl in 1774 and the view from it was the inspiration for Robert Burns's poem on the chimney piece of the Kenmore Inn.

The distillery has two wash stills with a capacity of about 16,500 liter and two spirit stills with 15,000 liters. With these capacities the Aberfeldy distillery lies in the middle of the range of pot still sizes.

== Products ==
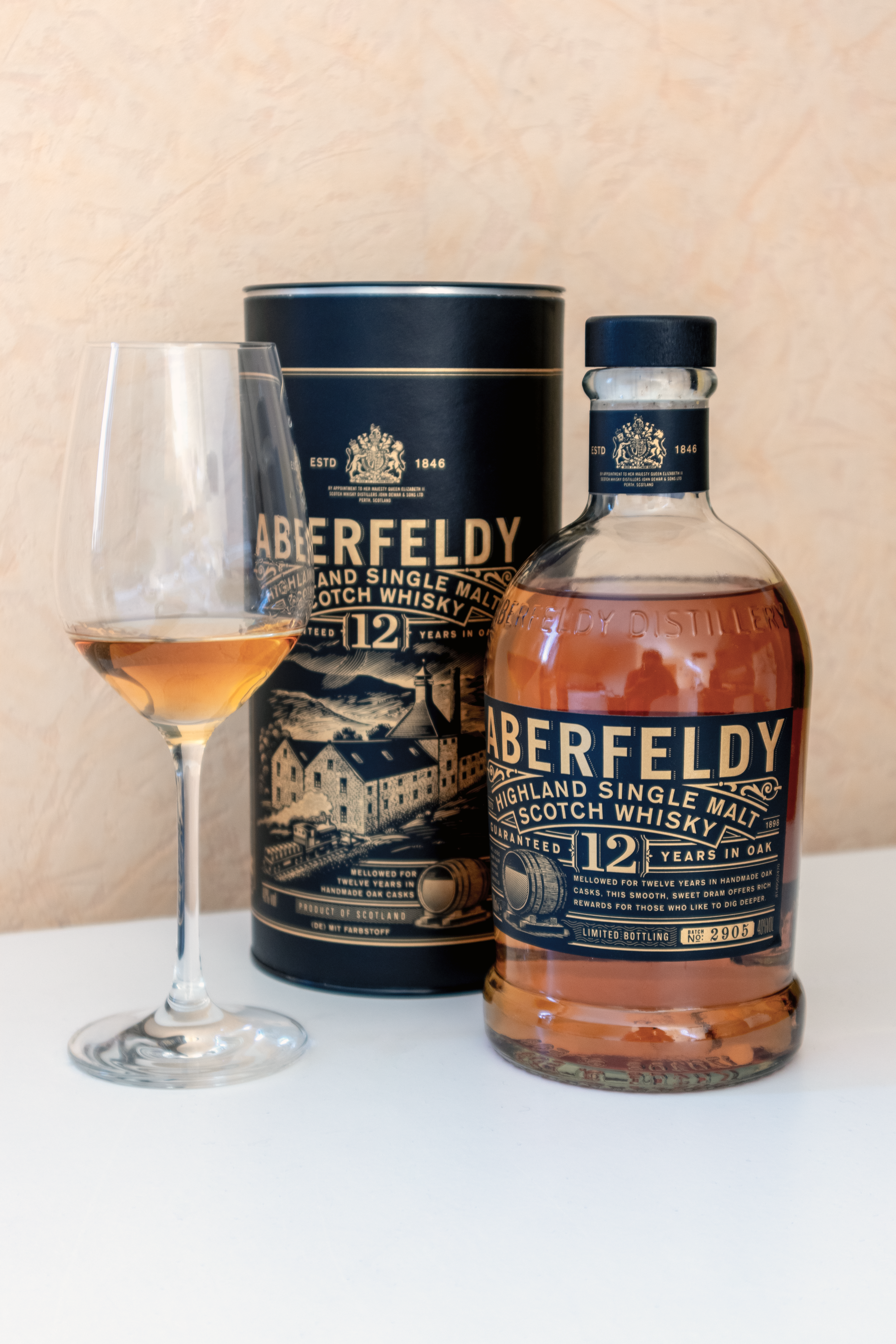
Aberfeldy 12 years old

Aberfeldy 12 years old Aberfeldy 18 years old Aberfeldy 21 years old

Whisky from the distillery is also independently bottled by bottlers including That Boutique-y Whisky Company, Gordon & MacPhail and WM Cadenhead.

== Reviews and accolades ==
International Spirit ratings organizations and liquor review bodies generally have had divergent reactions to Aberfeldy whiskies. The San Francisco World Spirits Competition has awarded the Aberfeldy 12- and 21-year whiskies a series of impressive medals, with the 12-year winning three golds and three silvers between 2007 and 2012 and the 21-year winning three golds, a double gold, and two bronze medals over the same time frame. By contrast, Wine Enthusiast Magazine rated both offerings in its 85-89 range, a relatively modest score, in 2008.
