= Aultmore distillery =

Whisky distillery in Moray, Scotland, UK

Coordinates: 57.5673°N 3.0021°W

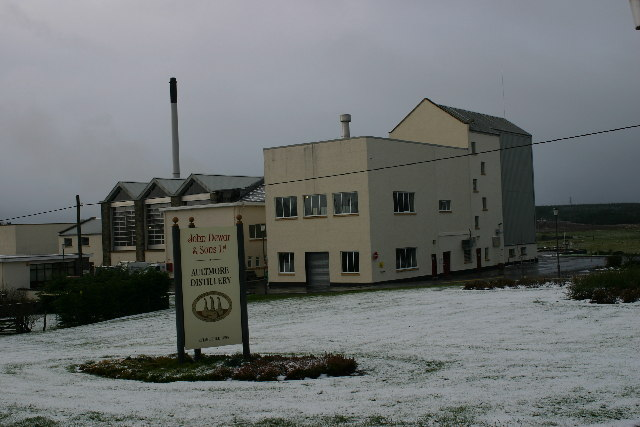
- The modern buildings of Aultmore distillery

Region: Speyside
- Location: Keith, Banffshire
- Owner: John Dewar & Sons (Bacardi)
- Founded: 1895
- Founder: Alexander Edward
- Status: Open
- Water source: Auchinderran burn
- No. of stills: 2 wash stills 2 spirit stills
- Capacity: 2,100,000 litres of pure alcohol per year

Aultmore
- Age(s): 12 years
- ABV: 46%

Aultmore distillery is a whisky distillery in Aultmore near Keith, Moray, producing an eponymous single malt whisky. Its name is a derived from the phrase An t-Allt Mòr, Gaelic for big burn, referring to its water source the Auchinderran burn.

== History ==
Aultmore distillery was founded in 1895 by Alexander Edward, then owner of the Benrinnes distillery. The distillery was originally powered by a waterwheel, and was soon adapted to use a steam engine instead, which ran day and night for 70 years, apart from maintenance. During maintenance hours power was provided by the mainly retired waterwheel. The steam engine is now on display at the distillery site. The distillery was expanded in 1898, and production doubled.

In 1899 the distillery was owned by Pattisons which went bankrupt in that year. Production plummeted, and the distillery closed. Aultmore reopened around 1904, and closed again during World War I due to barley shortages

It reopened again after World War I ended, and was bought by John Dewar & Sons, Ltd. in 1923. Shortly thereafter, in 1925, it was bought by Distiller Company. It changed hands again in 1930, when it was bought by Scottish Malt Distillers.

The distillery was in the 1950s one of the first to use the draff, a wasteproduct of whisky production, as animal feed.

The distillery's malting floors closed in 1968 and the entire distillery was rebuilt and expanded in 1970. A new spirit still and wash still were placed in addition to the two stills that were already present, and Aultmore Reopened in 1971.

In 1998 the distillery was sold back to Bacardi subsidiary Dewars, which had previously owned Aultmore between 1923 and 1925. Aultmore produced their first official bottling, a 12-year-old, in 2004, after an earlier flora and fauna release, and an earlier rare malts release.
