= Ultimat Vodka =

Polish vodka brand

- Parent: The Patrón Spirits Company

Ultimat Vodka
- Type: Vodka
- Origin: Poland
- Alcohol by volume: 40%
- Proof (US): 80

Ultimat is a brand of vodka produced in Poland and sold through the Patrón Spirits Company.

It is made from a blend of three different sources, potato, wheat and rye. It is triple distilled in Poland.

== History ==
The Patron Spirits Company, worldwide exclusive importer and marketer of the Patron tequila brand, acquired the global distribution rights to Ultimat vodka from New York–based Adamba Imports International.
