= Frederic Rhinelander King =

American architect

- Born: April 13, 1887
- Died: March 20, 1972 (aged 84); New York City, U.S.
- Education: St. George's School; Harvard College; Columbia University; École des Beaux-Arts
- Occupation: Architect
- Employers: McKim, Mead & White; Carrère and Hastings; Wyeth and King
- Spouse: Edith Percy Morgan (m. 1924; died 1968)
- Children: 2
- Relatives: Frederic W. Rhinelander (grandfather)

Frederic Rhinelander King (April 13, 1887 – March 20, 1972), was an American architect, and the co-founder with Marion Sims Wyeth of the architecture firm Wyeth and King.

== Early life ==
Frederic Rhinelander King was born in 1887. He was the son of LeRoy King (1857–1895) and the former Ethel Ledyard Rhinelander (1857–1925) of New York and Newport, Rhode Island. His siblings included LeRoy King, Jr., who married Mary Isabel Lockwood (daughter of Benoni Lockwood), Katharine Bulkeley Lawrence (niece of Edward H. Bulkeley), and Pamela Anne Sutherland Woodbury (daughter of George Henry Sutherland); and art collector Ethel Marjory King, who married Charles Howland Russell. The Kings' Newport residence was designed for his father by Stanford White, at the corner of Berkeley and Bellevue Avenues.

His paternal grandparents were Edward King and Mary Augusta (née LeRoy) King. Through his father, he was a direct descendant of both Nicholas Fish and Peter Stuyvesant, the last Dutch Director-General of New Netherland. His great-aunt, Elizabeth Stuyvesant (née LeRoy) Dresser was the mother of D. LeRoy Dresser and Edith Stuyvesant Dresser, who was married to George Washington Vanderbilt II and, later, U.S. Senator from Rhode Island, Peter Goelet Gerry. His maternal grandparents were Frederic William Rhinelander, trustee and the president of the Metropolitan Museum of Art, and Frances Davenport (née Skinner) Rhinelander. King's mother was Edith Wharton's first cousin and King served as the executor of Wharton's American estate.

He was educated at St. George's School in Rhode Island, after which he entered Harvard College, where he graduated from in 1908 with a Bachelor of Arts cum laude. He then studied architecture at Columbia University from 1908-1911, followed by studies at the prestigious École des Beaux-Arts, in Paris, from 1912-1914.

== Career ==
King apprenticed at the prominent beaux-arts architecture firm McKim, Mead & White from 1914–1917, and was associated with architect Lawrence Grant White between 1915 and 1917. His career was interrupted by the First World War. He served with the American Red Cross Commission in 1917, and following America's entry into the war, served as First Lieutenant in the US Army from 1918 until 1919.

Following the war, King continued his apprenticeship at the architecture firm Carrère and Hastings from 1919-1920. He formed an association in 1920 with the architect Marion Sims Wyeth, a friend from his student days in Paris. They formally joined in partnership in 1932, known as Wyeth and King and, after joining forces with William Royster Johnson in 1944, were known as Wyeth, King and Johnson. Generally speaking, Wyeth and Johnson were responsible for the work in Florida, while King was responsible for the work in Newport and New York City. His work was also part of the architecture event in the art competition at the 1936 Summer Olympics.

=== Principal architectural works ===
Designed by King (1920–1953)

- Tea House, Chateau-sur-Mer, 474 Bellevue Avenue, Newport, Rhode Island (completed 1920).
- LeRoy King House, Indian Spring, 0 Moorland Road, Newport, Rhode Island (completed 1927).
- Stuyvesant LeRoy House, Royden, 22 Castle Hill Avenue, Newport, Rhode Island (completed 1929).
- Frederick Allen House, 10 Hazard Road, Newport, Rhode Island (completed 1929).
- Frederic King House, Syosset, 678 Old Woodbury Road, Woodbury, New York (now The Town of Oyster Bay Chabad, completed 1929).
- Seamen's Church Institute, Market Square, Newport, Rhode Island (completed 1930).
- New facade and interior alterations, 14 East 81st Street, New York City (completed in 1930, but all was replaced in a 1991 alteration).

Designed in partnership with Marion Sims Wyeth (1932–1964)

- Women's National Republican Club, 23 West 51st Street, New York City (completed 1934).
- Episcopal Church of the Epiphany, York Avenue and 74th Street, New York City (dedicated in 1939).
- Diego Suarez residence, Brookville, New York (completed 1952).
- Alterations to Millbank Hall, Barnard College, New York City (completed 1953).
- Reginald B. Rives House, Seacliff, 562 Bellevue Avenue, Newport, Rhode Island (completed 1953).
- Addition to Council on Foreign Relations building, East 68th Street, New York City (completed 1954).
- Honyman Hall, Trinity Church, Newport, Rhode Island (completed 1956).
- Fourth Floor Addition, Phillips Collection, Washington, DC (completed 1960)
- Garden Library, Dumbarton Oaks, Washington DC (completed 1963).

== Personal life ==
In 1924, King married Edith Percy Morgan (1891–1968), the daughter of David Percy Morgan and Edith (née Parsons) Morgan, at the Church of the Epiphany when it was at Lexington Avenue and East 35th Street. Edith was the granddaughter of John Edward Parsons, president of the New York City Bar Association. They lived at 340 East 72nd Street and had a weekend home in Syosset, New York on Long Island. Together, they were the parents of twin sons:

- Rev. David Rhinelander King (1929–1987), who married Mary Sue Griffith. David was the rector of St. John's Episcopal Church in Elizabeth, New Jersey.
- Rev. Jonathan LeRoy King (1929-2019), who married Jacqueline Patricia Esmerian in 1958. Jaqueline was the daughter of Raphael Esmerian, who lived at 988 Fifth Avenue, and was president of R. Esmerian Inc., jewelers. Jonathan was the canon at the Cathedral of St. John the Divine.

King died at his residence in New York City on March 20, 1972. His funeral was held at the Church of the Epiphany in New York City.

=== Descendants ===
Through his son David, he was the grandfather of Nicholas Rhinelander King, who was married to Colleen Ellen Dunphy, the daughter of Joanne and Edward P. Dunphy, in 2000; Elizabeth Parsons King; and Melissa Morgan King.

Through his son Jonathan, he was the grandfather of four, including Cynthia Bayard King, who married Lee Gregory Vance, a son of Lee N. Vance (the vice president of the New York Stock Exchange), in 1986.
