= Clarence H. Geist =

American businessman (1866–1938)

Clarence Henry Geist
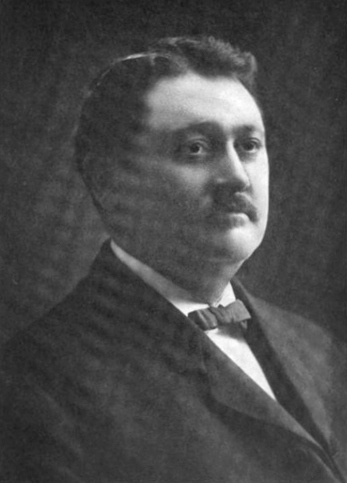
- Born: January 10, 1866; LaPorte County, Indiana, U.S.
- Died: June 12, 1938 (aged 72); Villanova, Pennsylvania, U.S.
- Resting place: West Laurel Hill Cemetery, Bala Cynwyd, Pennsylvania, U.S.
- Occupations: Utilities executive, financier
- Spouse: Florence Hewitt Geist

Clarence Henry Geist (1866 – June 12, 1938) was an American businessman who owned over 100 public utility companies and was the largest individual stock holder of public utility companies in the United States. His association with the water supply, including ownership of the Indianapolis Water Company and Philadelphia Suburban Water Company, earned him the nickname "Waterboy". He was president of the C. H. Geist Company, and director of several other companies including the United Gas Improvement Company and the Lehigh Coal & Navigation Company. He owned the Seaview golf club in Galloway, New Jersey, and the Boca Raton Club. He played a major role in the development of Boca Raton, Florida, including construction of a water plant, bridges, and train depot to support his resort.

== Early life and education ==
Geist was born and raised on a farm in LaPorte County, Indiana. He was educated at Valparaiso Normal School. When he was 18, he worked as a horse trader in the Western United States, but returned East when he realized he could not make enough money there. He settled in Blue Island, Illinois, and worked for a year on the Rock Island Railroad as a conductor.

== Career ==
He entered the real estate business and served as president of the Cottage Building and Loan in Blue Island. Geist then set himself up as a natural gas distributor, where he supplied gas to Blue Island, Morgan Park, then a suburb of Chicago, and Illinois suburbs south of Blue Island that included Harvey and Chicago Heights. He was associated with Charles G. Dawes and Rufus C. Dawes in the business of electric and gas utility companies.

In 1905, Geist moved to Philadelphia and purchased control of the Philadelphia Suburban Water Company. From 1912 to 1938 he was the principal owner of the Indianapolis Water Company. He also founded, in 1910, the company today known as South Jersey Industries, when the Atlantic City Gas and Water Company merged with Atlantic City Gas Company. His association with water supply earned him the nickname "Waterboy". He eventually owned over 100 utilities and was considered the largest individual stock holder of public utility companies in the United States.

He was the president of C. H. Geist Company, as well as president and director of American Pipe and Construction Company, the Philadelphia Suburban Water Company, and the Spanish River Land Company. He was a director of the United Gas Improvement Company and the Lehigh Coal & Navigation Company. He served on the board of trustees of Jefferson Medical College and the board of directors of Bryn Mawr College. He was the founder and owner of the Seaview golf club in Galloway, New Jersey.

=== Boca Raton development ===
When Addison Mizner's Mizner Development Corporation went bankrupt in 1926 after trying to build the new resort of Boca Raton, Geist bought its assets in 1927 via an anonymous bid of $76,350. Included were the Cloister Inn, fifty houses, and 15,000 acres (6,100 ha) of land. He commissioned the New York architectural firm Schultze and Weaver to create an addition to the 100-room Cloister Inn, resulting in the 450-room Boca Raton Club, which was formally opened in January 1930.

Geist made a low-interest loan to Boca Raton to finance its first municipal water plant (which he had convinced Boca Raton it needed) and provide water for the guests at his new hotel. He built it in Mizner's style, for visual harmony. At the time, the Mediterranean-style plant was the most modern in the state. He also paid for a Spanish-style train depot on the Florida East Coast Railway. Geist allegedly bought stock in the railroad in order to build the depot for guests in his hotel to arrive. He built bridges over the Boca Raton inlet and other waterways to facilitate traffic to his resort.

== Personal life ==
He married Florence Hewitt Geist and together they had three daughters. He was an avid golfer, and though he walked with a cane, he participated in tournaments.

He owned the Godfrey Residence, a mansion in Radnor, Pennsylvania, and Launfal, a mansion in Villanova, Pennsylvania. In 1924 he built La Claridad in Palm Beach, a mansion designed by architect Marion Sims Wyeth, who also designed Mar-a-Lago.

== Death and legacy ==
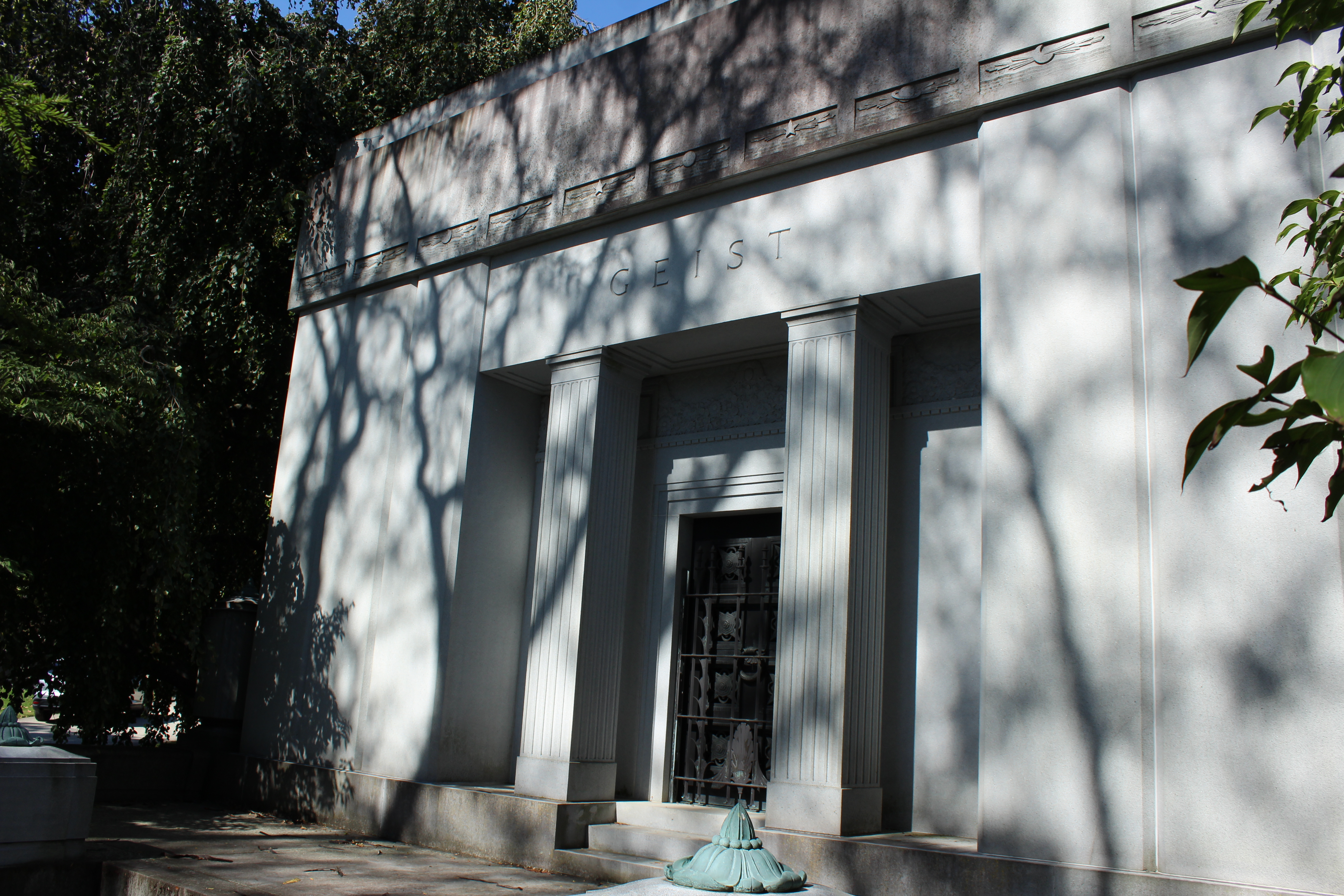
Clarence H. Geist mausoleum in West Laurel Hill Cemetery

He died at his home in Villanova, Pennsylvania, on June 12, 1938 and was interred at West Laurel Hill Cemetery in Bala Cynwyd, Pennsylvania. His estate was valued at over $54 million.

Geist Reservoir, a water source for Indianapolis, is named for him. The bridge over the Intracoastal Waterway on Mizner's Camino Real is officially the Clarence H. Geist Memorial Bridge, replacing a temporary swing bridge built by Geist.

The Clarence H. Geist Memorial Organ was installed by the M. P. Moller company in 1939 at the Overbrook Presbyterian Church in Philadelphia.
