= Dumbarton Oaks =

Historic estate in Washington, D.C.

- Harvard University
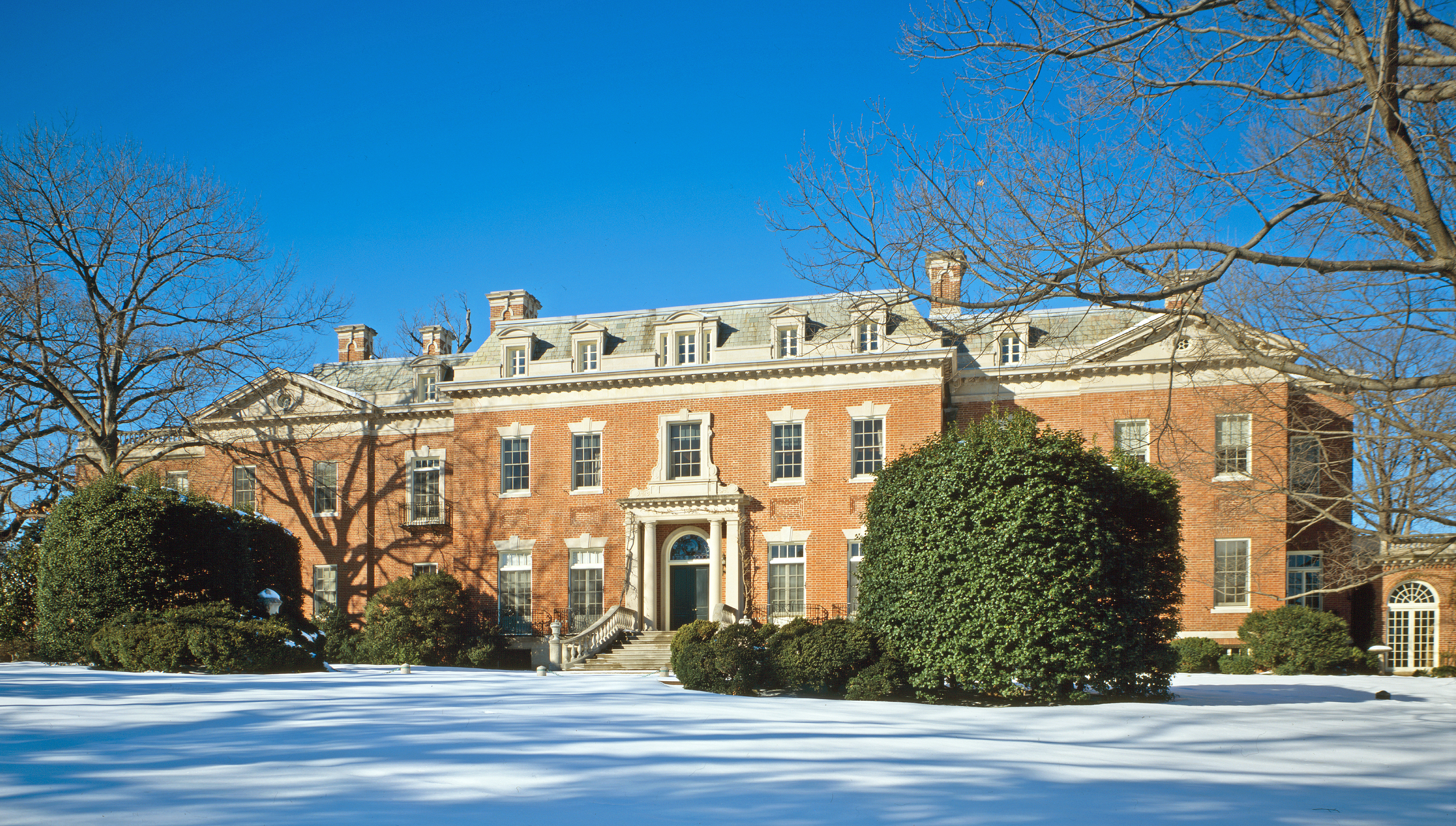
- Location: Washington, D.C.
- Coordinates: 38°54′51″N 77°03′48″W
- Founders: Robert Woods Bliss; Mildred Barnes Bliss
- Established: 1801; 225 years ago
- Founded: 1940; 86 years ago
- Website: www.doaks.org

Dumbarton Oaks, formally the Dumbarton Oaks Research Library and Collection, is a historic estate in the Georgetown neighborhood of Washington, D.C. It was the residence and gardens of wealthy U.S. diplomat Robert Woods Bliss and his wife Mildred Barnes Bliss. The estate was founded by the Bliss couple, who gave the home and gardens to Harvard University in 1940.

In 1944, it was the site of the Dumbarton Oaks Conference, which developed plans for the founding of the United Nations following World War II. The part of the landscaped portion of the estate that was designed as an enhanced "natural" area, was given to the National Park Service and is now Dumbarton Oaks Park.

The research institute that has emerged from the bequest to Harvard is dedicated to supporting scholarship in the fields of Byzantine and Pre-Columbian studies, as well as garden design and landscape architecture through its research fellowships, meetings, exhibitions, and publications. It also opens its garden and museum collections to the public, and hosts public lectures and a concert series. Dumbarton Oaks is distinct from Dumbarton House, a Federal Style historic house museum also located in the Georgetown area.

== History ==
=== Early history ===
The land of Dumbarton Oaks was formerly part of the Rock of Dumbarton grant that Queen Anne made in 1702 to Colonel Ninian Beall (ca. 1625-1717). Around 1801, William Hammond Dorsey (1764–1818) built the first house on the property (the central block of the existing structure) and an orangery. Edward Magruder Linthicum (1787–1869) greatly enlarged the residence in the mid-nineteenth century and named it The Oaks. The Oaks also was the Washington residence of Senator and Vice President John C. Calhoun (1782–1850) between 1822 and 1829.

In 1846, Edward Linthicum bought the house and enlarged it. Henry F. Blount bought it in 1891.

=== Bliss era ===
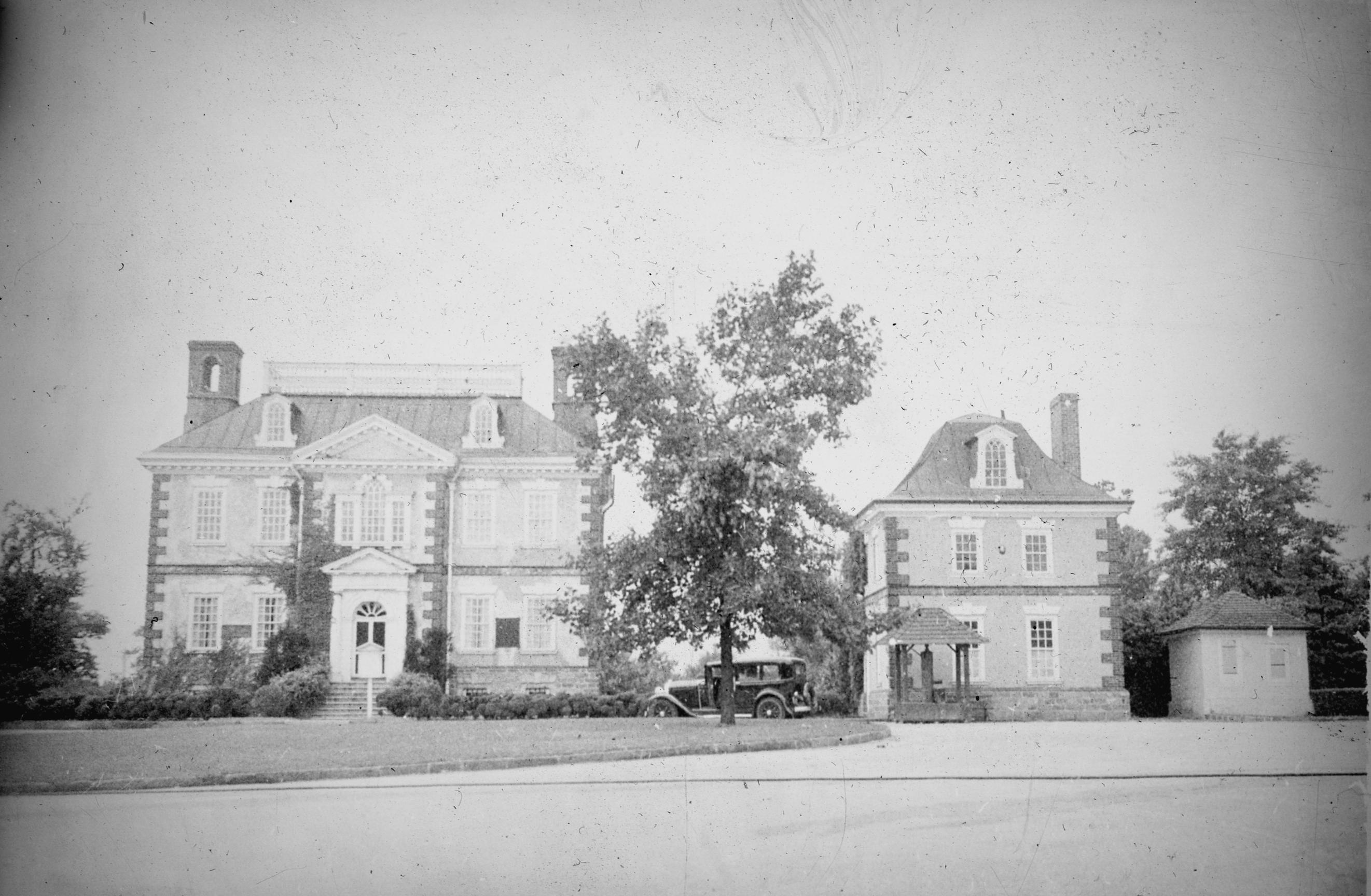

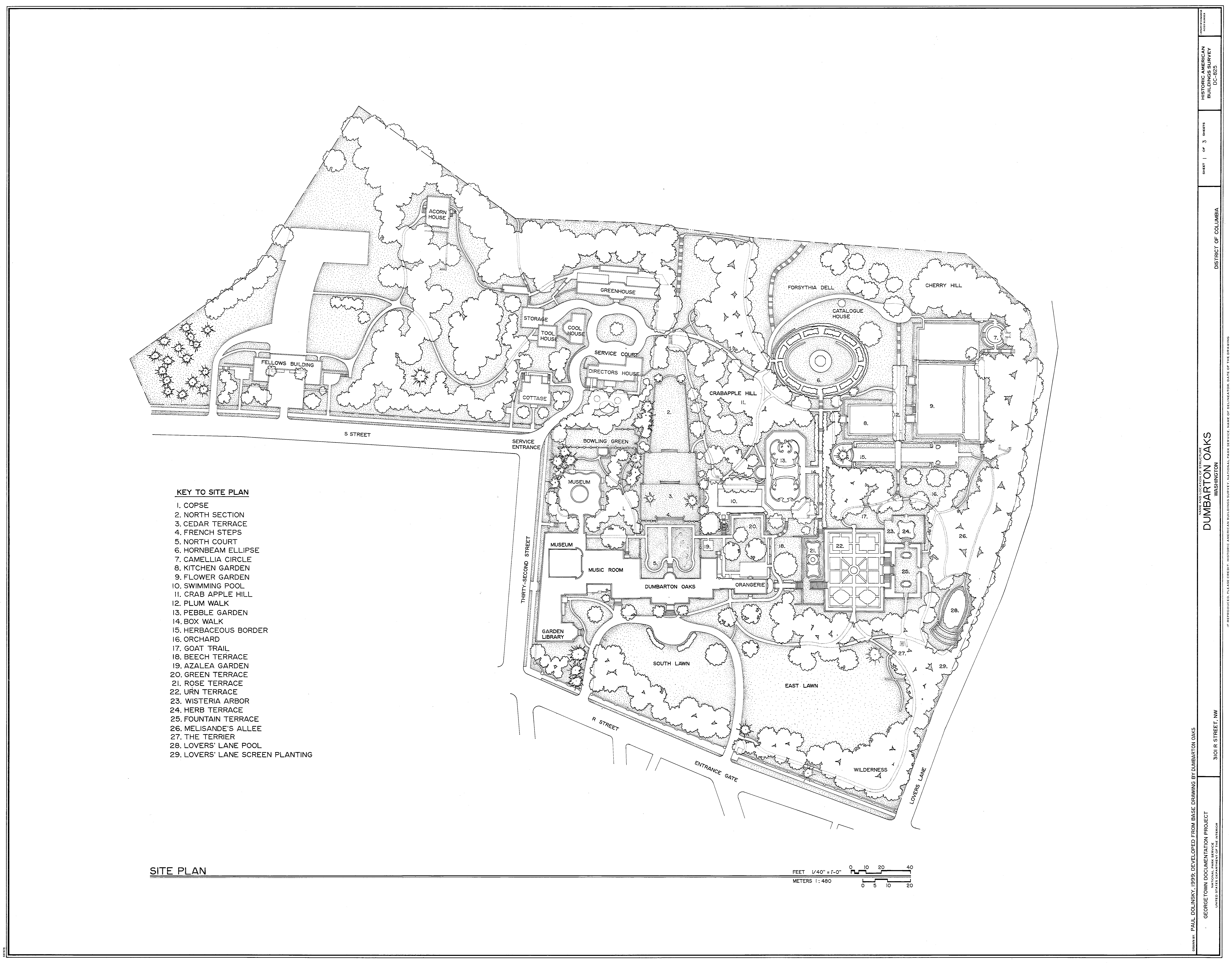
Dumbarton Oaks site plan

Mildred and Robert Woods Bliss acquired the property in 1920, and in 1933 they gave it the name of Dumbarton Oaks, combining its two historic names. The Blisses engaged the architect Frederick H. Brooke (1876–1960) to renovate and enlarge the house (1921–1923), thereby creating a Colonial Revival residence from the existing Linthicum-era Italianate structure. Over time, the Blisses increased the grounds to approximately 54 acres (220,000 m^{2}) and engaged the landscape architect Beatrix Farrand (1872–1959) to design a series of terraced gardens and a wilderness on this acreage, in collaboration with Mildred Bliss (1921–1947). The Blisses' architectural additions to the estate included four service court buildings (1926) and a music room (1928), designed by Lawrence Grant White (1887–1956) of the New York City architectural firm of McKim, Mead and White, the superintendent's dwelling (1933), designed by Farrand. Later renamed the Fellows Building, this building is now known as the Guest House.

After retiring to Dumbarton Oaks in 1933, the Blisses immediately began laying the groundwork for the creation of a research institute. They greatly increased their already considerable collection of artworks and reference books, forming the nucleus of what would become the Research Library and Collection. In 1938 they engaged the architect Thomas Tileston Waterman (1900–1951) to build two pavilions to house their Byzantine Collection and an 8,000-volume library, and in 1940 gave Dumbarton Oaks (which included about 16 acres (65,000 m^{2}) of land) to Harvard University, Robert Bliss's alma mater. At the same time they gave a portion of the grounds—some 27 acres—to the National Park Service to establish the Dumbarton Oaks Park.

In 1941, the administrative structure of Dumbarton Oaks, now owned by Harvard University, was modeled according to the following design: the Trustees for Harvard University, composed primarily of the President and Fellows of Harvard College, made all appointments, including those to the Administrative Committee, which in turn would supervise the entire operation and refer to the Trustees such recommendations as may require their action. This committee was first chaired by Paul J. Sachs (1878–1965), Harvard Professor and Associate Director of the Fogg Art Museum, but by 1953 it was chaired by the Dean or Provost and, beginning in 1961 and thereafter, by the President of Harvard University.

In early years the Administrative Committee appointed a Board of Scholars to make recommendations in regard to all scholarly activities. The Board of Scholars was first organized in 1942 (with eleven members, of which seven were from Harvard); its membership was increased to twenty-two members by 1960. In 1952, this board was titled the Board for Scholars in Byzantine Studies. In 1953, a Garden Advisory Committee was created to make recommendations in regard to the garden and, later, to the Garden Library and its Fellows, and in 1963 an Advisory Committee for Pre-Columbian Art was created. The Administrative Committee also historically appointed a Visiting Committee consisting of persons interested in the welfare and broad aims of Dumbarton Oaks. This committee was abolished in 1960 when it was replaced by a Board of Advisors.

Wishing to increase the scholarly mission of Dumbarton Oaks, in the early 1960s the Blisses sponsored the construction of two new wings, one designed by Philip Johnson (1906–2005) to house the Robert Woods Bliss Collection of Pre-Columbian Art and its research library and, the other, a garden library designed by Frederic Rhinelander King (1887–1972), of the New York City architectural firm Wyeth and King, to house the botanical and garden architecture rare books and garden history reference materials that Mildred Bliss had collected.

==== Dumbarton Oaks Concerto ====
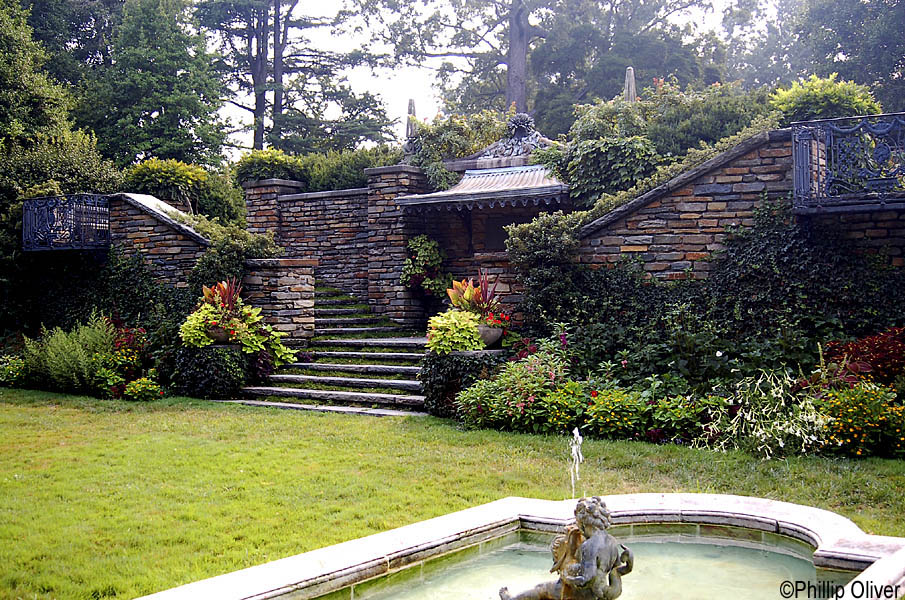
The Fountain Terrace at Dumbarton Oaks

In 1937, Mildred Bliss commissioned Igor Stravinsky (1882–1971) to compose a concerto in the tradition of Bach's Brandenburg concertos to celebrate the Blisses' thirtieth wedding anniversary. Nadia Boulanger (1887–1979) conducted its premiere on May 8, 1938 in the Dumbarton Oaks music room, due to the composer's indisposition from tuberculosis. At Mildred Bliss's request, the Concerto in E-flat was subtitled "Dumbarton Oaks 8-v-1938," and the work is now generally known as The Dumbarton Oaks Concerto. Igor Stravinsky conducted the concerto in the Dumbarton Oaks music room on April 25, 1947 and again for the Bliss's golden wedding anniversary, on May 8, 1958. He also conducted the first performance of his Septet, which is dedicated to the Dumbarton Oaks Research Library and Collection, in the music room on January 24, 1954.

==== Dumbarton Oaks Conference ====
In the late summer and early fall of 1944, at the height of the Second World War, a series of important diplomatic meetings took place at Dumbarton Oaks, officially known as the Washington Conversations on International Peace and Security Organization. Delegations from China, the Soviet Union, the United Kingdom, and the United States deliberated over proposals for the establishment of an organization to maintain peace and security in the world. Their meetings resulted in the United Nations Charter that was adopted in San Francisco in 1945.

=== Post-Bliss era ===
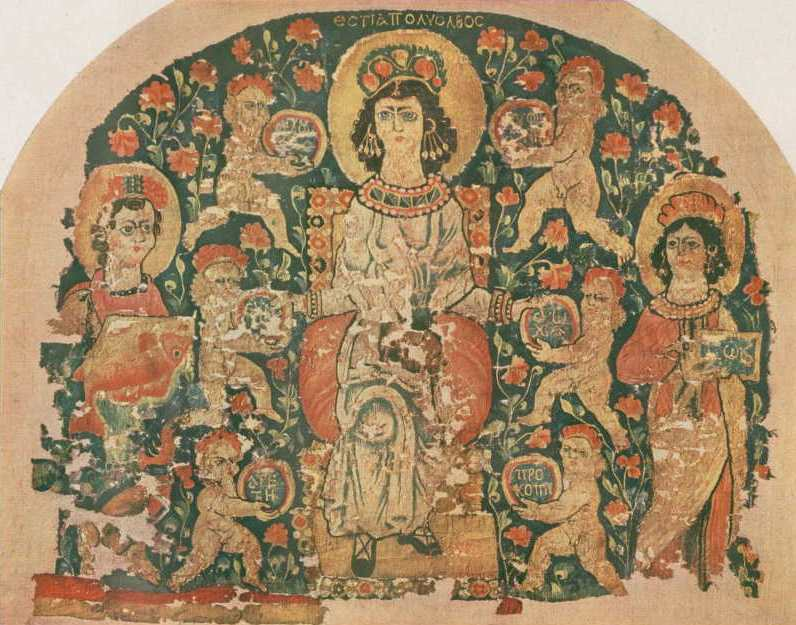
The Hestia Tapestry, Egypt, 6th century

In the preamble to her last will and testament, Mildred Bliss offered the following assessment of what she and her husband had created at Dumbarton Oaks:

In applying the gifts to Harvard, I call upon the present and future President and Fellows of Harvard College and all those who determine its policies, to remember that Dumbarton Oaks is conceived in a new pattern, where quality and not number shall determine the choice of its scholars; that it is the home of the Humanities, not a mere aggregation of books and objects of art; that the house itself and the gardens have their educational importance and that all are of humanistic value.

Those responsible for scholarship at Dumbarton Oaks should remember that the Humanities cannot be fostered by confusing Instruction with Education; that it was my husband's as well as it is my wish that the Mediterranean interpretation of the Humanist disciplines shall predominate; that gardens have their place in the Humanist order of life; and that trees are noble elements to be protected by successive generations and are not to be neglected or lightly destroyed. I charge those responsible for carrying forward the life at Dumbarton Oaks to be guided by the standards set there during the lifetime of my husband and me. The distinction of the scholars themselves as well as of their writings; the interpretation of the texts and the arts; the quality of the music performed; the free discussion within the limits of good deportment, and the whole tempered by the serenity of open spaces and ancient trees; all these are as integral a part of Humanism at Dumbarton Oaks as are the Library and the Collections. The fulfillment of this vision of high intellectual adventure seen through the open gates of Dumbarton Oaks will add lustre to Harvard, to the academic tone of our country and to scholarship throughout the world.

To help the institution better fulfill its mandate, administrative changes were slowly introduced after 1969, the year Mildred Bliss died. The Garden Advisory Committee was abolished in 1974 and replaced in 1975 by the Advisory Committee for Studies in Landscape Architecture. In 1975, the Advisory Committee for Pre-Columbian Art similarly was renamed the Advisory Committee for Pre-Columbian Studies. The Board for Scholars in Byzantine Studies was abolished in 1975 and replaced by the Senior Fellows Committee. In 1981, the three advisory groups were uniformly named the Senior Fellows. Beginning in 1979, the Administrative Committee became composed of four members almost always including the President, the Dean of the Faculty of Arts and Sciences, a senior faculty member of Harvard University, and (until 1994) the Director of Dumbarton Oaks. The Board of Advisors was abolished in 1991.

The institution has continued to be a major sponsor of archaeological excavations and art restoration projects. During the 1970s it funded major fieldwork projects work in Cyprus, Syria, and Turkey, efforts that today span the entire geographical breadth of the former Byzantine commonwealth. Dumbarton Oaks began to fund archaeology in Central and South America in the mid-1990s.

In 2005, Dumbarton Oaks inaugurated a new gardeners' court and a 44,500-square-foot (4,130 m^{2}) library, both designed by Robert Venturi (1925–2018) of the Philadelphia architectural firm of Venturi, Scott Brown & Associates. In 2008 the institute also completed an extensive renovation of the main house and museum wing, including restoration of its historic period rooms, several of which were created by the Parisian designer, Armand-Albert Rateau (1882–1938).

== Research ==
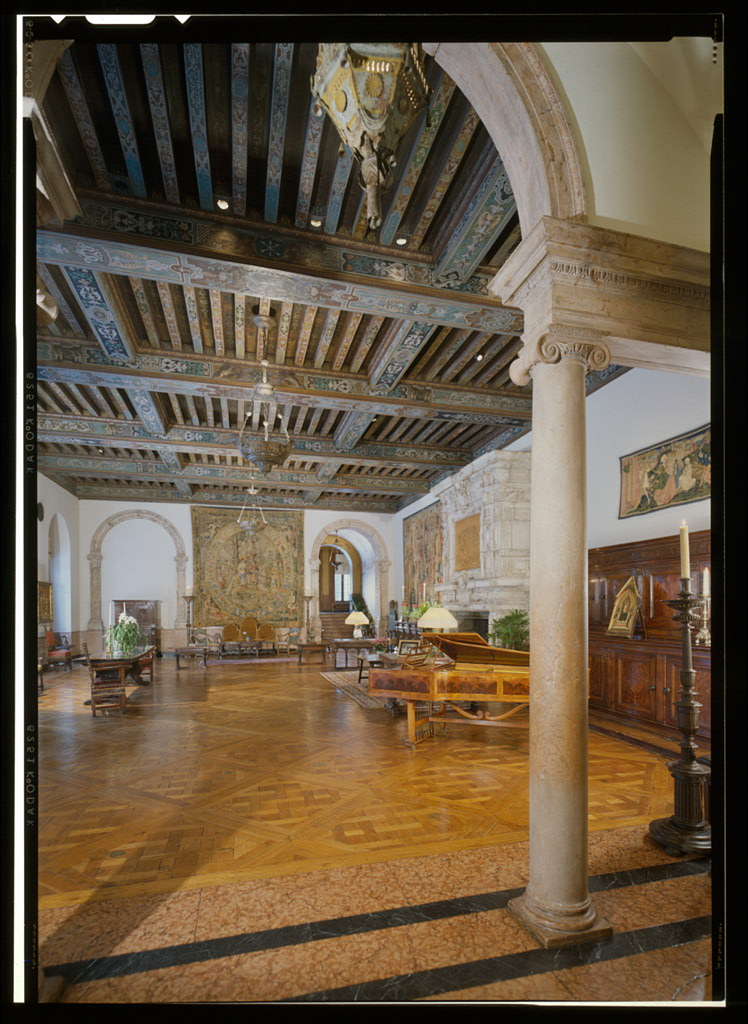
Dumbarton Oaks music room

Dumbarton Oaks is one of three centers for advanced research in the humanities belonging to Harvard but located outside of Cambridge, Massachusetts. The others are the Center for Hellenic Studies, founded in 1962, also in Washington, D.C., and Villa I Tatti, opened in 1961, in Florence, Italy.

=== Institutional program ===
The mission of Dumbarton Oaks is to support and promote scholarship in three areas of study: Byzantine, Pre-Columbian, and garden and landscape architecture. Through a fellowship program, the institute invites scholars from around the world for an academic year or a summer to pursue individual research. A grants program also supports archaeological research, materials analysis, and photographic surveys of objects and monuments. In addition, each studies program sponsors public lectures, symposia, and colloquia as well as scholarly publications including annual journals, symposium proceedings, and occasional monographs.

=== Byzantine Studies ===
The program in Byzantine Studies, established in 1940, supports scholarship on the civilization of the Byzantine Empire from the fourth to the fifteenth centuries and its interactions with neighboring cultures and civilizations, including the late Roman, early Christian, western medieval, Slavic, and Near Eastern.

=== Pre-Columbian Studies ===
The program in Pre-Columbian Studies was founded in 1963 to support the study of the art and archaeology of the ancient Americas. The program focuses on the cultures that thrived in the western hemisphere from northern Mexico to southern South America, from the earliest times to the sixteenth century.

=== Garden and Landscape Architecture Studies ===
Dumbarton Oaks awarded the first fellowship in landscape architecture in 1956 under the provisions of the Dumbarton Oaks Garden Endowment Fund established in 1951 by the Blisses. However, the program in Garden and Landscape Studies (formerly known as Landscape Architecture Studies) was established in 1969 and inaugurated in 1972 to support the study of gardens and the history of landscape architecture around the world from ancient times to the present.

== Museum and collections ==
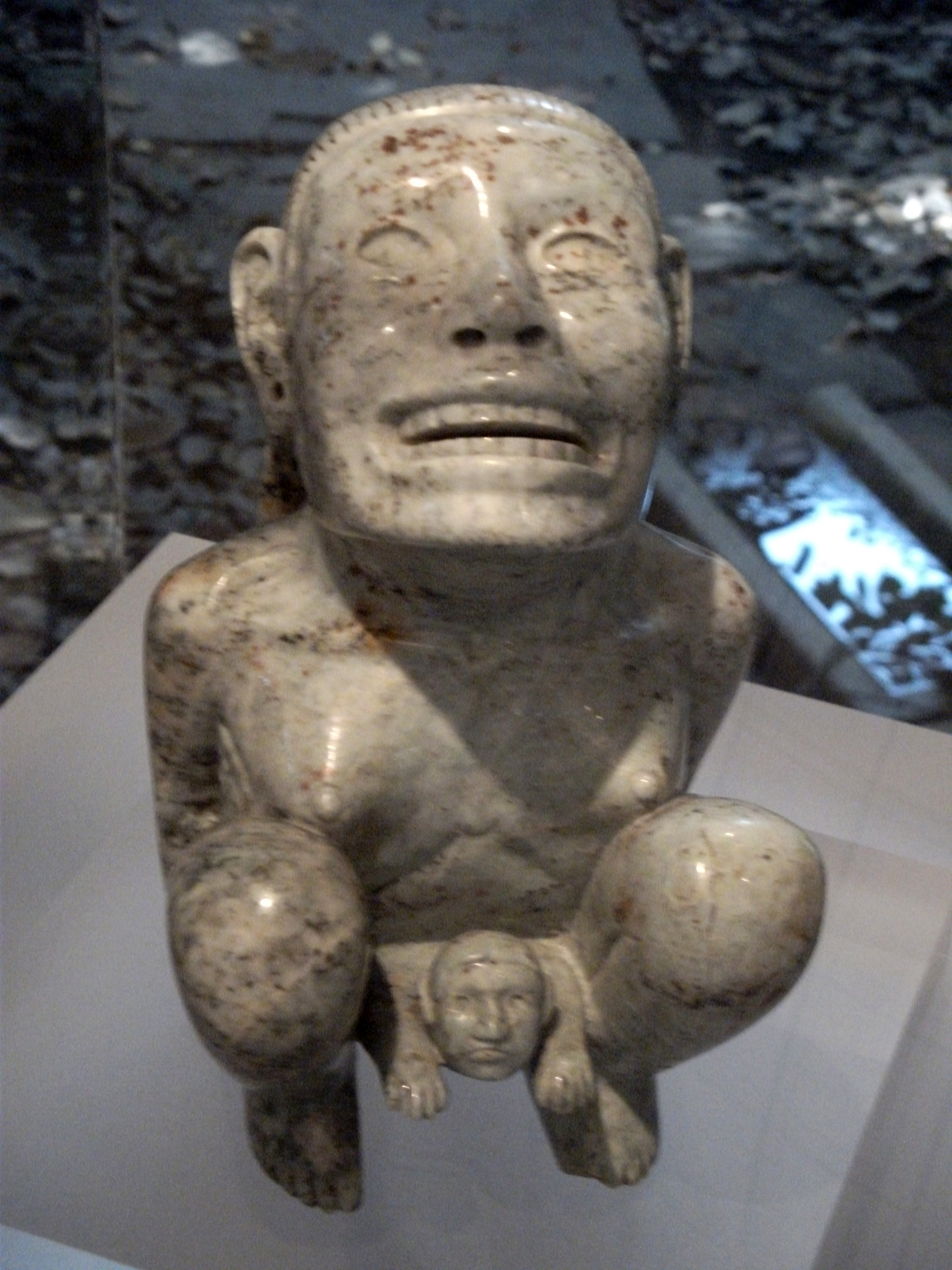
The Dumbarton Oaks birthing figure

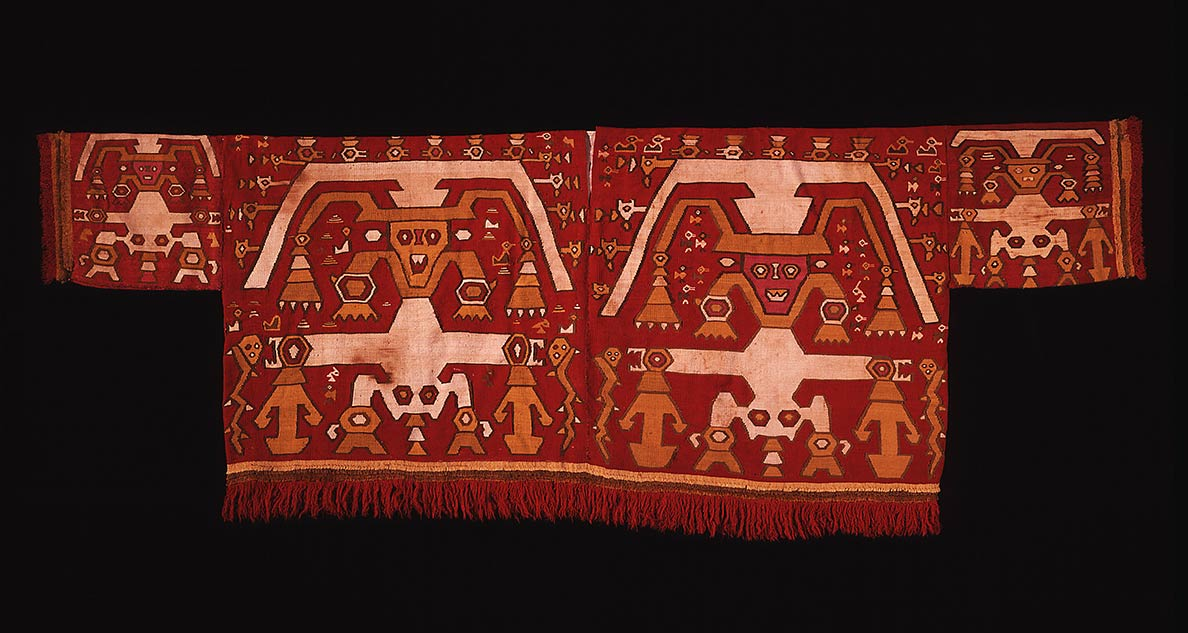
Tapestry shirt, Chimú, 1400–1540 CE. Dumbarton Oaks collection PC.B.503.

The Dumbarton Oaks Museum features collections of Byzantine and Pre-Columbian art, as well as European artworks and furnishings. Mildred and Robert Woods Bliss initiated these collections in the first half of the twentieth century and provided the vision for future acquisitions even after giving Dumbarton Oaks to Harvard University.

The Byzantine Collection spans the imperial, ecclesiastical, and secular realms and comprises more than 1,200 objects from the fourth to the fifteenth centuries. Although the collection emphasizes objects of precious materials, underscoring the conception of Byzantine art as luxury art, the collection also includes large-scale works such as mosaics from Antioch and relief sculpture, as well as more than two hundred textiles and comprehensive holdings of coins and seals. It owns six manuscripts (see, e.g., Minuscule 705). In addition to its Byzantine holdings, the collection includes Greek, Roman, and western medieval artworks and objects from the ancient Near East, pharaonic and Ptolemaic Egypt, and various Islamic cultures.

The Robert Woods Bliss Collection of Pre-Columbian Art comprises objects from the ancient cultures of Mesoamerica, the Intermediate Area, and the Andes. Among its most important holdings are a variety of sculptures in stone, including carvings of Aztec deities and animals and several large relief panels bearing the likenesses of Maya kings. In addition there are sculpted anthropomorphic figurines and polished jade renderings of ritual objects from the Olmec, Veracruz, and Teotihuacan cultures as well as molded and painted ceramics of the Nasca, Moche, and Wari cultures. Gold and silver objects from the Chavín, Lambayeque, Chimú, and Inca cultures offer evidence of the expertise achieved by Andean metalsmiths, and over forty textiles and works in feathers testify to the importance of fiber arts in this region.

The House Collection consists primarily of Dumbarton Oaks' historic buildings and interiors, Asian, European, and American artworks, and interior furnishings. Principal to the collection is the renaissance-style Music Room. The ceiling and flooring of this room were inspired by examples at the guardroom of the historic Château de Cheverny near Paris and were fabricated by the Parisian designer, Armand Albert Rateau. The Music Room features displays of tapestries, sculptures, paintings, and furniture dating from the fifteenth to the eighteenth centuries. The Blisses used the room for hosting musical programs and scholarly lectures, and it continues to serve these purposes.

=== Philip Johnson Pre-Columbian Pavilion ===
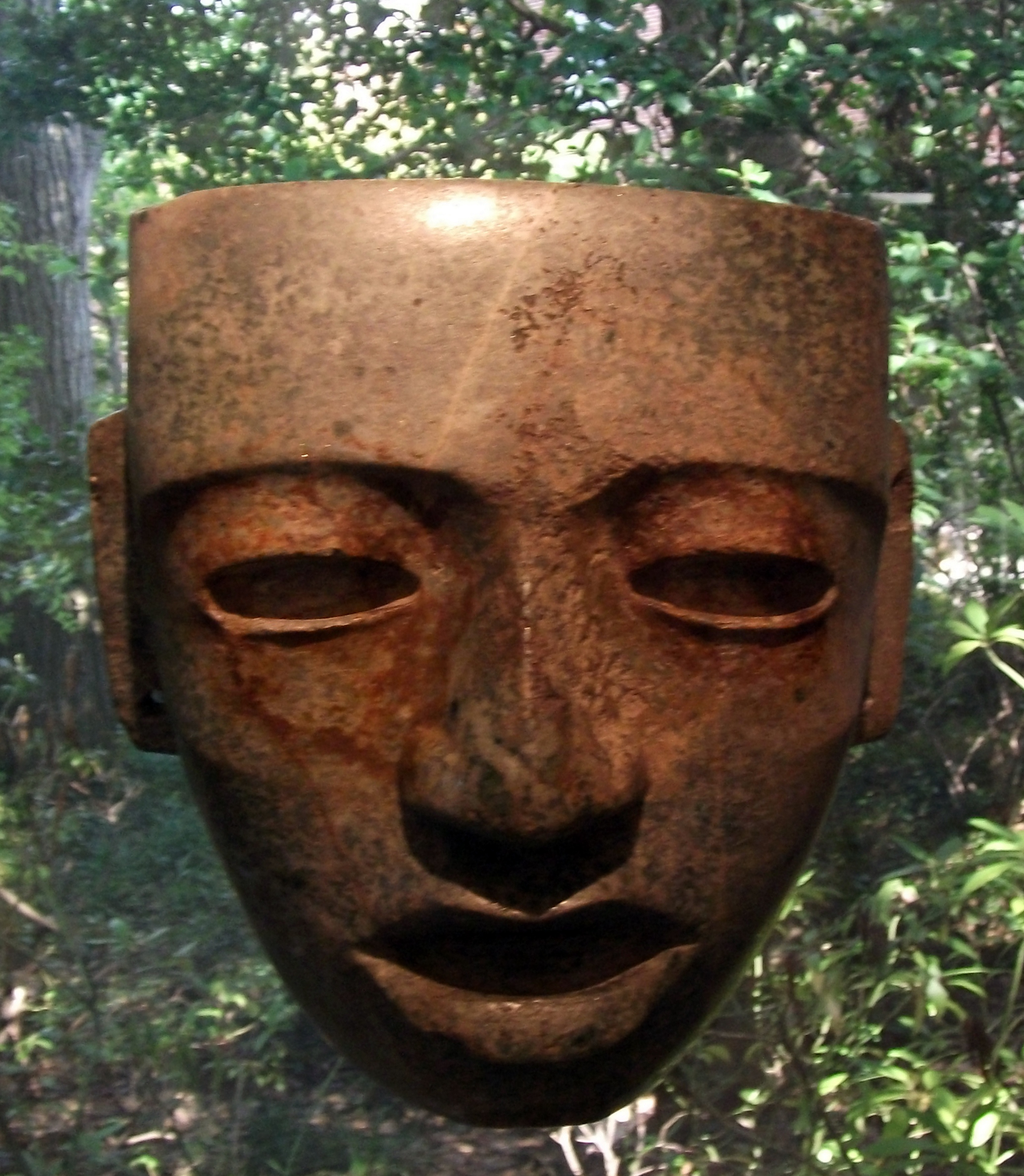
Stone mask from Teotihuacán, 200-500 CE, in the pavilion

In 1959, the Blisses commissioned the New York City architect Philip Johnson to design a pavilion for the Robert Woods Bliss Collection of Pre-Columbian Art. This building—eight domed circular galleries (having an unroofed fountain area at the center) set within a perfect square—recalls Islamic architectural ideas, and Johnson later credited the design to his interest in the early sixteenth-century Turkish architect Mimar Sinan. The pavilion was built in the Copse, one of the designed landscapes at Dumbarton Oaks, and Johnson employed curved glass walls to blend the landscape with the building. He later reminisced that his idea was to fit a small pavilion into an existing treescape, to make the building become part of the Copse. Johnson maintained that he wanted the garden to "march right up to the museum displays and become part of them," with the plantings brushing the glass walls and the sound of splashing water audible in the central fountain. To further this idea, he incorporated four interior glazed planter areas situated between the galleries and the fountain.

Johnson also believed that the pavilion was to be best enjoyed from the inside. In addition to offering interesting garden views, the eight gallery spaces allow for a well-organized circulation plan. They also provide intimate areas for visitors to enjoy and study the Pre-Columbian objects. Each interconnected exhibition gallery is twenty-five feet in diameter, having curved glass walls supported by cylindrical columns sheathed in Illinois Agatan marble and shallow domes that rise from flat bronze rings. The floors are teak, laid radially and ended by wide rims of mottled green Vermont marble.

== Library ==
The Dumbarton Oaks Research Library contains more than 200,000 items that support the three studies programs. The Byzantine holdings of materials concerning late classical, early Christian, Byzantine, and medieval art and archaeology, which numbered 8,000 volumes at the time of the Blisses' gift, now number 149,000 volumes with more than 550 journal subscriptions. In 1964, the Research Library acquired Robert Woods Bliss's personal collection of 2,000 rare and important works on Pre-Columbian art history, anthropology, and archaeology, which has since grown to more than 32,000 volumes, and Mildred Bliss's garden library, including rare volumes and prints, which now includes 27,000 books and pamphlets. The Rare Book Collection has holdings of more than 10,000 volumes, prints, drawings, photographs, and blueprints.

The Rare Book Room, designed by Frederick Rhinelander King in the style of an 18th-century library, was completed in 1963 to house the collection of rare books and drawings which had been started by Mildred Bliss. Her library was enlarged, with advice from Beatrix Farrand, designer of the Dumbarton Oaks garden, once Mrs. Bliss conceived the idea in the 1950s of starting a program of studies in landscape architecture. The Research Library is housed separately from the Rare Book Collection, in a building designed by VSBA architects and completed in 2005.

The collection of books originated in Mrs. Bliss's aim to preserve illustrated books from being broken up for individual plates. There are volumes of views which are especially valuable for the study of gardens since few of the sites survive as originally created. For example, Giovanni Battista Falda's 17th-century plates showing the gardens of Rome; views of Versailles and other royal gardens in Louis XIV's France by Perelle and Sylvestre; and Jan Kip and Leonard Knyff's early-18th-century bird's-eye views of English country estates. The latter works yield almost the only evidence of the appearance of these geometrical or regular designs before their supplanting by the irregular or "picturesque" taste.

Since landscape architecture grew out of other professions – most obviously, those of architecture, botany and horticulture – the collection also includes treatises by great architectural theorists such as Alberti, Palladio, and Serlio as well as works by such distinguished botanists as Clusius and Linnaeus, or Catesby's Natural History of Carolina. Books on buildings that served as models for garden structures like pavilions and follies and others relating to the design and decoration of fountains, with the hydraulics necessary for their operation, are included, along with books on sculpture and iconography.

Many volumes in the library describe great gardens or garden practice, for example Robert Castell's The Villas of the Ancients Illustrated and various editions of Andrew Jackson Downing's A Treatise on the Theory and Practice of Landscape Gardening. The collection is also rich in works illustrating flowers and plants – early herbals and botanical writings, floras – works on horticulture, and even agriculture as it affects the life of country estates, such as a 1495 edition of Pietro de' Crescenzi's Il libro della agricultura. The herbals represent early attempts to create a coherent system of plant description and are forerunners of today's science of taxonomy. Two of them, the Herbarius Latinus, printed in Passau in 1486, and the Hortus Sanitatis, printed in Mainz in 1491, are among the earliest printed books with woodcut illustrations.

As the science of botany developed, so did the art of plant illustration. Early herbals had simple, not very realistic, woodcut illustrations of plants. By the 17th century new graphic techniques, such as metal plate engraving and etching, permitted highly detailed botanical renderings. These techniques were also used by artists who created the newly popular still lifes of flowers and fruits, and by artisans, such as jewelers, tapestry weavers, and furniture decorators, in pattern books recording their floral designs. The increasing sophistication of techniques of plant illustration in the 18th century culminated in the development of color printing. The library owns copies of works by Redouté, the first artist to exploit fully the potential of color printing of stipple engravings in such renowned books as Les Roses or the multi-volume Liliacées, and works by other masters of the period, including Georg Dionysius Ehret's Plantae et papiliones rariores, 1748-1759.

In addition to printed books, there is a collection of manuscripts and drawings covering the same range of topics – a late 17th-century planting plan for an Italian garden; Hans Puechfeldner's fine images of late 17th-century mannerist gardens; a number of paintings by oriental artists executed for western patrons to record discoveries of new plants made during the expansion of Europe into the East. The Library owns the original watercolors for Buchoz's Collection des Fleurs dans les Jardins de la Chine as well as the gouaches by Clara Maria Pope for Samuel Curtis's Beauties of Flora. Watercolors by Redouté, among other artists, a diminutive late 16th-century manuscript of flower illuminations attributed to Jacques le Moyne, and an early Italian manuscript herbal are just some of the library's treasures.

The collection continues to be developed. Noteworthy acquisitions from recent years are Francesco Colonna's La Hypnerotomachia di Poliphilo, 1545 edition; Salomon de Caus's La pratique et demonstration des horloges solaire, published in Paris in 1624; and Humphry Repton's album of 500 engraved views taken from William Peacock's Polite Repository, arranged by year.

The garden rare book collection is both a unique tool for historical inquiry and a testimony to the enduring human delight in gardens and garden creation, which is, as Sir Francis Bacon wrote, "the Purest of Humane pleasures." It was a claim echoed by Mrs. Bliss, whose testimony to the value of gardens and scholarship is inscribed upon the exterior walls of her library.

== Image Collections and Fieldwork Archives ==
The Image Collections and Fieldwork Archives hold more than 500,000 images in a variety of formats, the majority of which are of Byzantine subject matter. Photographs and archival collections supporting pre-Columbian and garden and landscape studies are being developed.

== Garden ==
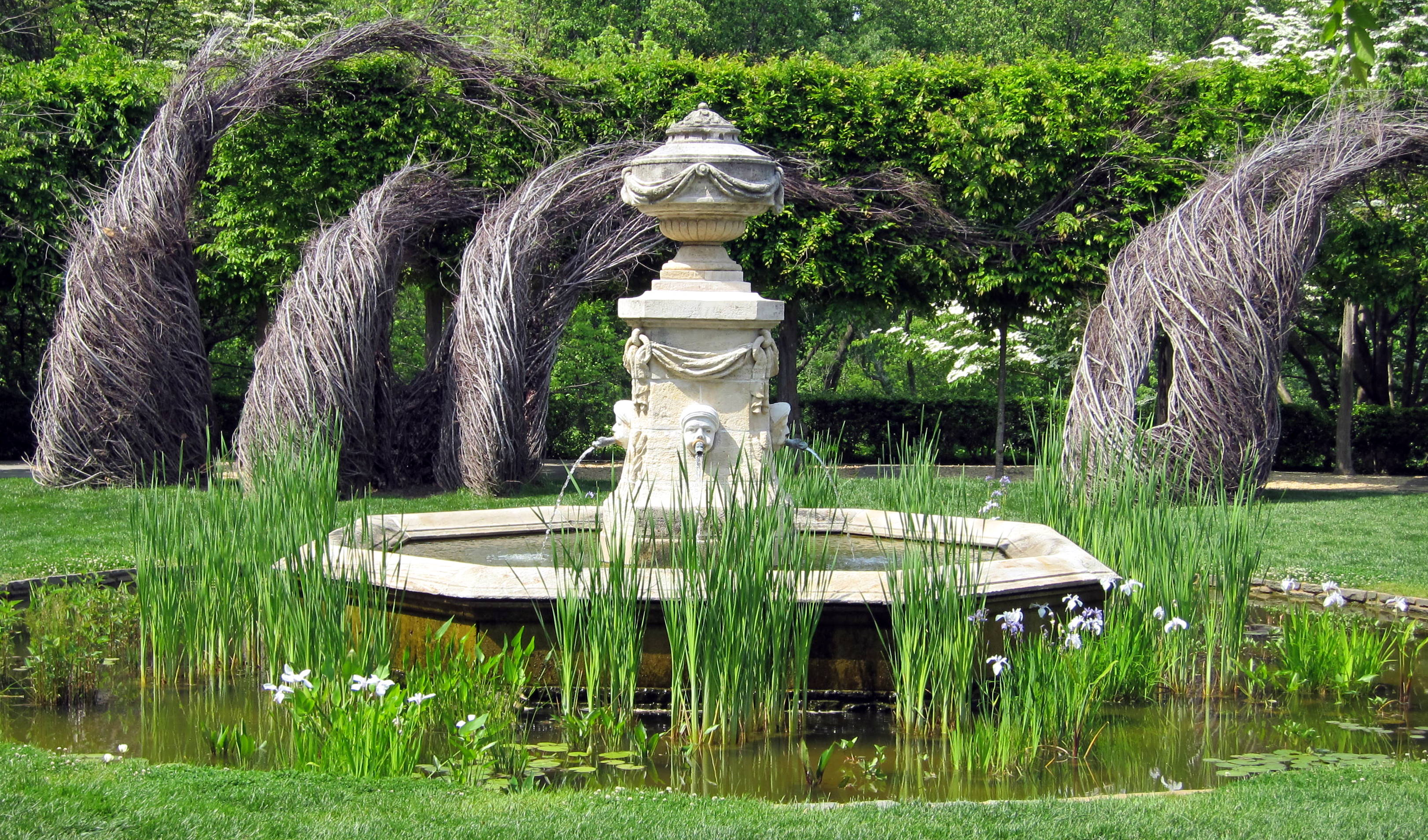
A fountain in the Dumbarton Oaks garden

In 1921, the Blisses hired landscape gardener Beatrix Farrand to design the garden at Dumbarton Oaks, and for almost thirty years Mildred Bliss collaborated closely with Farrand. Together they transformed the existing farmlands surrounding the house into terraced garden rooms and vistas, creating a garden landscape that progressed from formal and elegant stepped terraces, in the near vicinity of the house, to a more recreational and practical middle zone of pools, tennis court, orchards, vegetable beds, and cutting gardens, and concluding at the far reaches of the property with a rustic wilderness of meadows and stream. Within the garden rooms, Bliss and Farrand used a careful selection of plant materials and garden ornaments to define the rooms' character and use. Since that time, other architects working with Mildred Bliss—most notably Ruth Havey and Alden Hopkins—changed certain elements of the Farrand design.

The garden at Dumbarton Oaks was first opened to the public in 1939. The Dumbarton Oaks Park is a 27-acre naturalistic streamside valley park, maintained as a part of Rock Creek Park. The woodland area was designed as a "wild" complement to the formal terraced gardens.

== Events ==
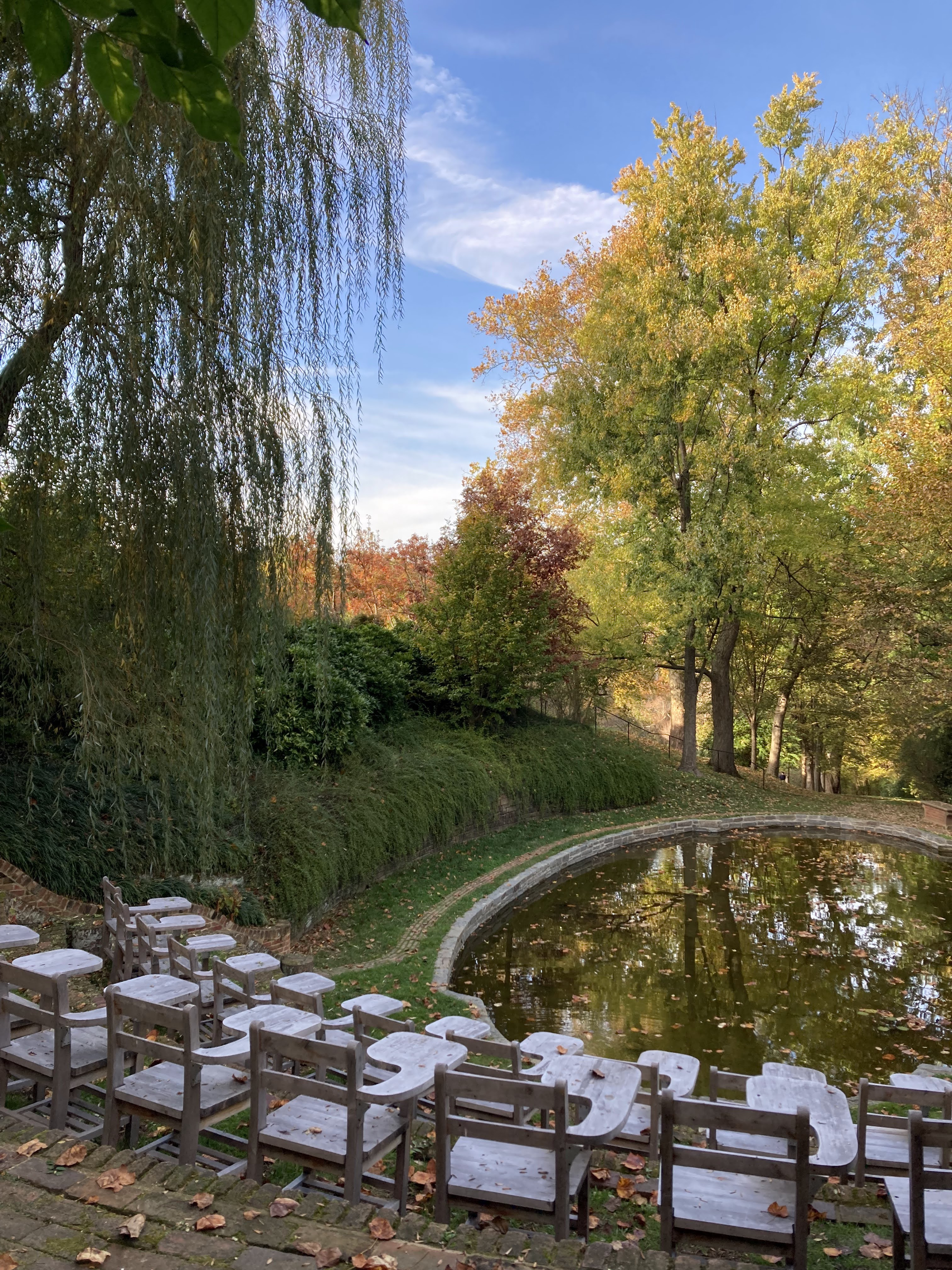
Art installation in the Dumbarton Oaks Garden

=== Music at Dumbarton Oaks ===
In 1946, Dumbarton Oaks inaugurated the Friends of Music concerts to offer a yearly chamber music subscription series in the music room. This series was based on the similar Friends of Music at the Library of Congress, of which Mildred Bliss was a long-time member. In 1958, Dumbarton Oaks commissioned Aaron Copland (1900–1990) to compose Nonet for Solo Strings (generally known as Nonet for Strings) in honor of the Blisses' fiftieth wedding anniversary. Nadia Boulanger conducted its world premier with nine members of the National Symphony Orchestra on March 2, 1961. Copland dedicated the piece "to Nadia Boulanger after forty years of friendship." In 2006, Dumbarton Oaks commissioned Joan Tower to compose Dumbarton Quintet, which was premiered in the music room on April 12, 2008, with the composer at the piano. In 2017 the series was renamed Music at Dumbarton Oaks.

=== Public lectures ===
Public lectures are offered regularly, held in the Oak Room of the Fellowship House. The lectures are noted for presenting recent discoveries or innovative scholarship that command public interest.

== Directors ==
- John Seymour Thacher, Acting Director, 1945, Director, 1946–1969
- William R. Tyler, 1969–1977
- Giles Constable, 1977–1984
- Robert W. Thomson, 1984–1989
- Angeliki Laiou, 1989–1998
- Edward L. Keenan, 1998–2007
- Jan M. Ziolkowski, 2007–2020
- Thomas B.F. Cummins, 2020–Present

== See also ==
- List of botanical gardens and arboretums in the United States
- Tudor Place
- Architecture of Washington, D.C.
