= Freedley =

Freedley is a surname. Notable people with the surname include:

- Durr Freedley (1888–1938), American painter
- John Freedley (1793–1851), American politician, lawyer, and businessman
- Vinton Freedley (1891–1969), American theater and television producer
