= Hestia Tapestry =

6th century AD Greek pagan tapestry

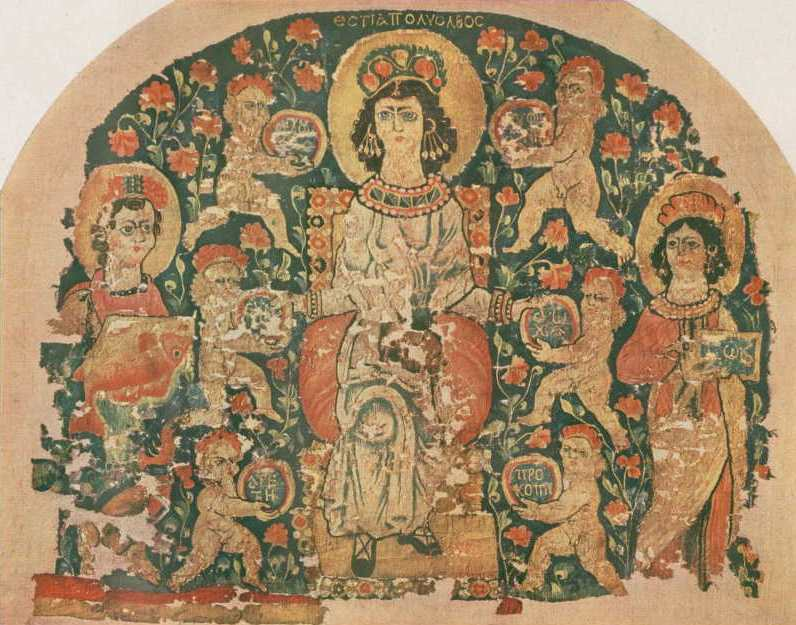
"Hestia full of Blessings" Egypt, 6th century tapestry in the Dumbarton Oaks Collection, 136.5 x 114 cm (53.7 x 44.9 inches)

The Hestia tapestry is a Byzantine-era pagan tapestry made in the Diocese of Egypt in the first half of the 6th century. It is now in the Dumbarton Oaks Collection in Washington DC, but generally not on display.

The Hestia tapestry, which is made of wool, is a late representation of the goddess Hestia. It measures 114 x 136.5 cm (44.9 x 53.7 inches). It shows the goddess enthroned with two attendants and six putti. The tapestry is identified in Greek as “Hestía Polýolbos" or "Hestia full of Blessings" (Greek: Ἑστία Πολύολβος) and is depicted mainly through the use of pomegranate fruit. Her headdress and earrings are made from pomegranates while the blessings that Hestia gives out are in the form of the fruit.

The tapestry's history and symbolism are discussed in Friedlander (1945). Scholars note that this pagan artifact was often displayed in Christian households in Egypt.

== Bibliography ==
- Kitzinger, Ernst. Handbook of the Byzantine Collection. Washington, D.C.: Dumbarton Oaks, 1967
- Friedlander, Paul. Documents of a Dying Paganism: Textiles of Late Antiquity in Washington, New York, and Leningrad. Berkeley, University of California Press, 1945
- Sessa, Kristina. Daily Life in Late Antiquity. Cambridge: Cambridge University Press, 2018
- Shrenk, Sabine. "The Background of the Enthroned: Spatial Analysis of the Hanging with Hestia Polyolbos in the Dumbarton Oaks Collection." In Catalogue of the Textile in the Dumbarton Oaks Byzantine Collection, eds. Gudrun Bühl and Elizabeth Dospěl Williams. Washington, D.C.: Dumbarton Oaks, 2019
- Stone, Damien. Pomegranate: A Global History. London: Reaktion Books, 2017
