= Dumbarton Oaks Park =

Park in Washington, D.C., U.S.

- U.S. National Register of Historic Places
- U.S. National Historic Landmark District – Contributing property
- D.C. Inventory of Historic Sites
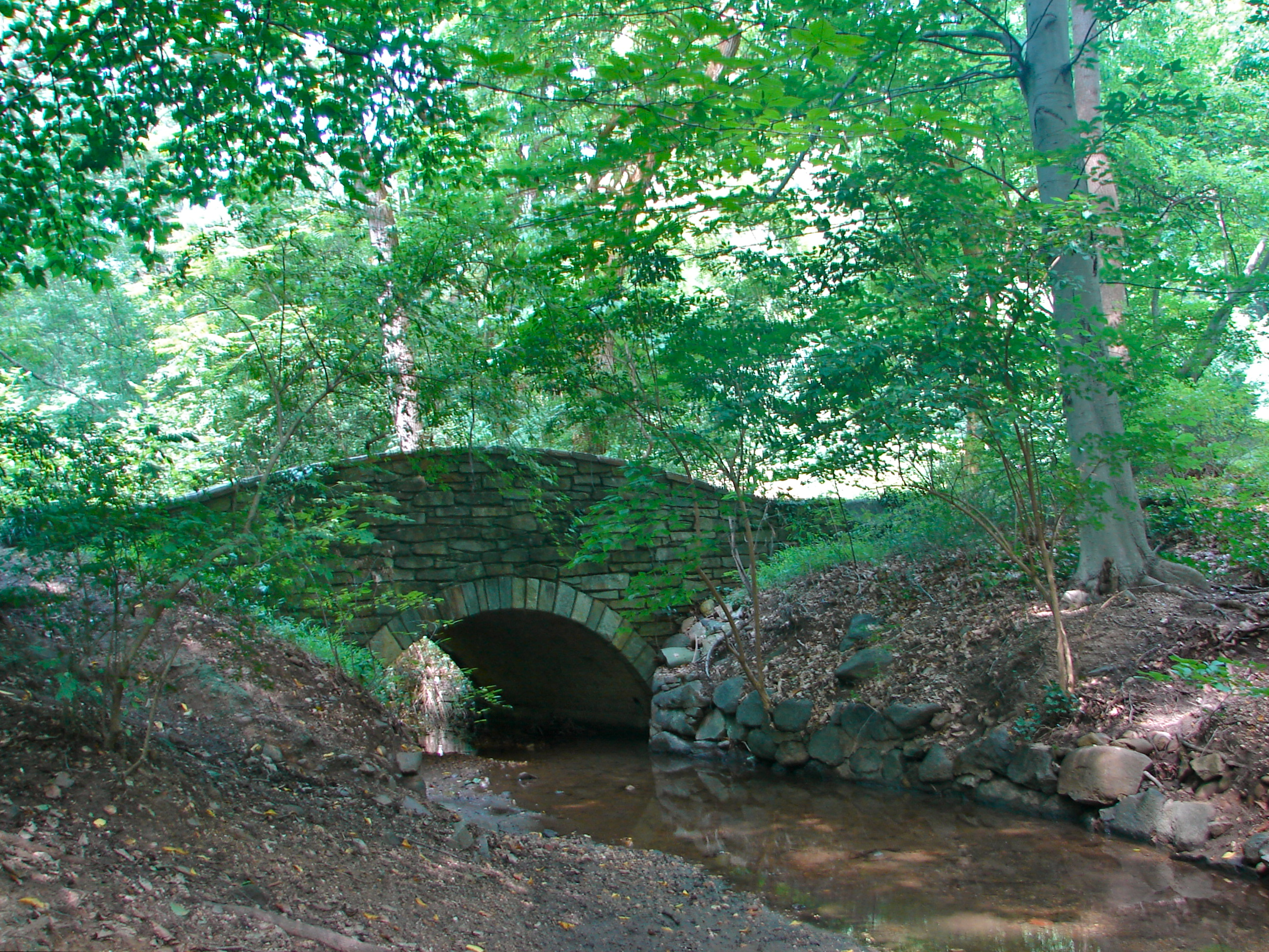
- Dumbarton Park Bridge in 2011

- Location within Washington, D.C.
- Location: R Street, N.W., Washington, District of Columbia
- Coordinates: 38°54′55″N 77°3′44″W
- Area: 27 acres (11 ha)
- Built: 1932
- Architect: Beatrix Farrand and James Berrall
- NRHP reference No.: 67000028

Significant dates
- Added to NRHP: May 28, 1967
- Designated DCIHS: March 3, 1979

The Dumbarton Oaks Park is a public park, located in the 3100 block of R Street, Northwest, Washington, D.C., in the Georgetown neighborhood. Access is via Lovers' Lane from R Street, east of 32nd Street. It is located near Dumbarton Oaks, Montrose Park, and Oak Hill Cemetery. It is part of the Georgetown Historic District. Now part of Rock Creek Park, it originally belonged to the Dumbarton Oaks estate which had designed it as an enhanced "natural" area. In the 2020s the National Park Service worked with the estate to restore and preserve the landscape architecture of Beatrix Farrand in the park.

== History ==
Robert Woods Bliss and Mildred Barnes Bliss purchased the Dumbarton Oaks estate in 1920, and established the garden. The park is a naturalistic streamside garden area of 27 acres, beyond the 10 acre formal garden, designed by Beatrix Farrand. In 1940, the Blisses gifted Dumbarton Oaks Park to the National Park Service, turning over creative control and upkeep of the plantings located there. Both Montrose Park and Dumbarton Oaks Park were jointly listed on the National Register of Historic Places on May 28, 1967. Montrose Park obtained an individual listing on 2007. In 1998 and 1999, Student Conservation Association groups restored the south stream path. Dumbarton Oaks Park Conservancy has been formed to provide restoration.
