= South Jersey Industries =

South Jersey Industries, Inc.
- Traded as: NYSE: SJI
- Industry: Utilities
- Founded: 1910
- Founder: Clarence H. Geist
- Headquarters: Folsom, New Jersey, U.S.
- Key people: Michael J. Renna (President & CEO) Stephen H. Clark (Executive Vice President) Steven R. Cocchi (Senior Vice President & Chief Strategy and Development Officer) Kenneth Lynch (Senior Vice President & Chief Accounting and Risk Officer) Kathleen A. McEndy (Senior Vice President & Chief Administrative Officer) Melissa Orsen (Senior Vice President & Corporate Counsel) Dave Robbins (Senior Vice President)
- Products: Electricity; Natural gas
- Revenue: ▲US$ 925.067 million (2010)
- Operating income: ▲US$ 116.492 million (2010)
- Net income: ▲US$ 66.652 million (2010)
- Total assets: ▲US$ 2.076 billion (2010)
- Total equity: ▲US$ 570.097 million (2010)
- Number of employees: 2000
- Website: www.sjindustries.com

South Jersey Industries is an energy services holding company for a natural gas utility and other, non-regulated companies. It is based in New Jersey.

The company was publicly traded on the New York Stock Exchange until 2023. The company was taken private by the Infrastructure Investments Fund of J.P. Morgan & Co.

== Subsidiaries ==
SJI's family of companies include:

- South Jersey Gas - delivering natural gas to more than 380,000 residential, commercial and industrial customers in New Jersey's seven southern counties.
- South Jersey Energy Solutions - As the parent company for South Jersey Industries’ non-regulated businesses, SJES provides energy to commercial and industrial customers.
- South Jersey Energy - SJE is a licensed, deregulated energy supplier.
- South Jersey Resources Group - SJRG is a non-regulated, wholesale natural gas marketing company. SJRG provides natural gas commodity, storage, and wholesale and transportation services to more than 83 customers throughout the southern, eastern and mid-western portions of the country, including Fortune 500 companies, energy marketers, natural gas and electric utilities and natural gas producers.
- South Jersey Energy Service Plus - Acquired by HomeServe USA
