= The Boca Raton Resort =

Resort and club in Boca Raton, Florida

The Boca Raton
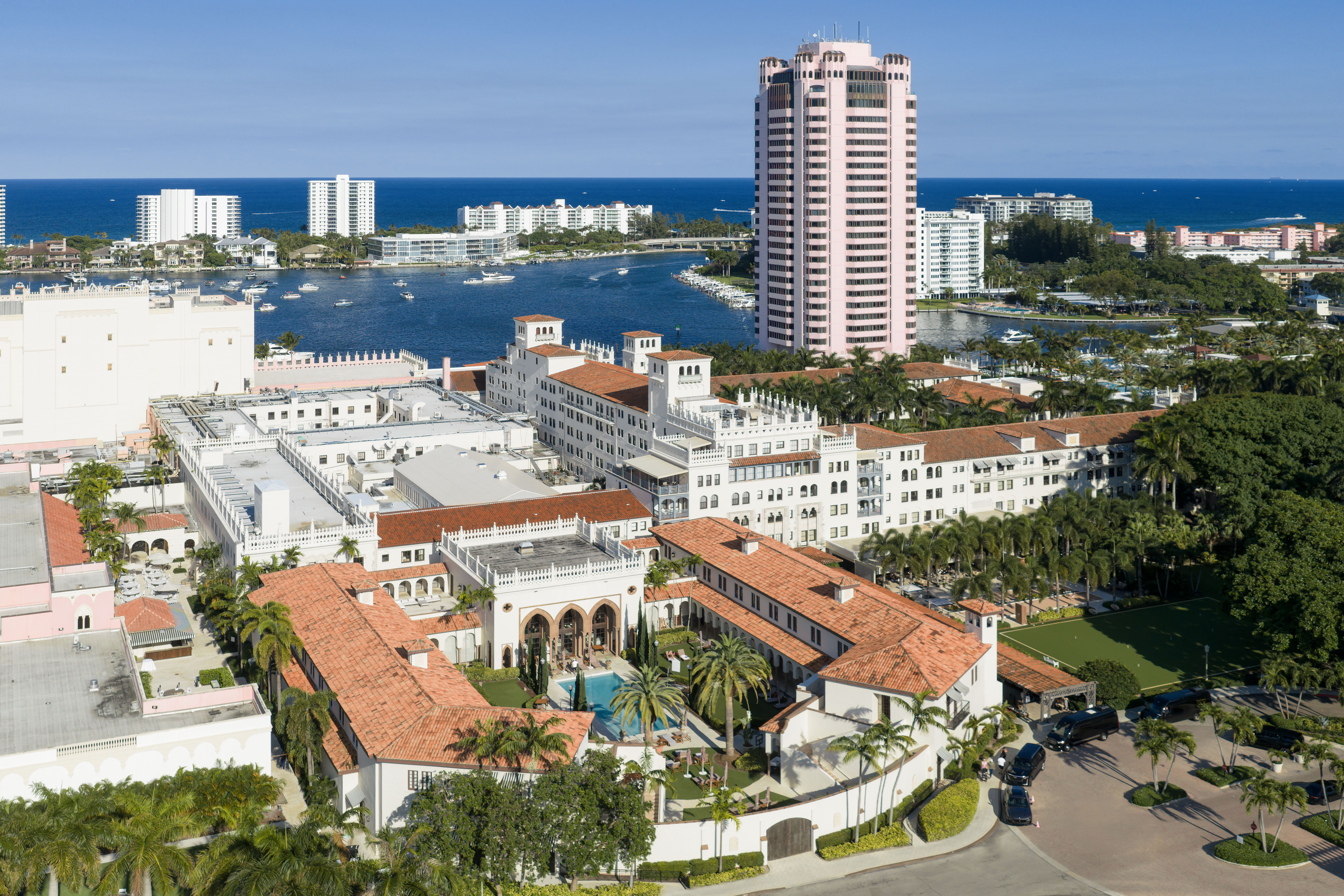
- Interactive map of the The Boca Raton area

General information
- Location: Boca Raton, Florida, USA
- Coordinates: 26.341403°N 80.077562°W
- Opened: February 6, 1926
- Owner: MSD Partners

Design and construction
- Architects: Addison Mizner (original); Schultze and Weaver (1930s expansion); Donaldson Group Architects (1969 tower)
- Developer: Mizner Development Corp. and Ritz-Carlton

Other information
- Number of rooms: 1,038
- Number of restaurants: 15+
- Parking: Valet parking only

Website
- www.thebocaraton.com

The Boca Raton (often called the Boca Resort by locals) is a luxury resort and club in Boca Raton, Florida, founded in 1926, today comprising 1,047 hotel rooms across 337 acres. Its facilities include a 18-hole golf course, a 50,000 sq. ft. Forbes Five-Star spa, eight swimming pools, 30 tennis courts, a full-service 32-slip marina, more than 15 restaurants and bars, and 200,000 sq. ft. of meeting space. The property fronts both Lake Boca (part of the Intracoastal Waterway) and the Atlantic Ocean. The resort was operated as part of Hilton's Waldorf Astoria Hotels and Resorts, and it is now privately owned by an affiliate of MSD Partners with the new name, The Boca Raton.

== History ==
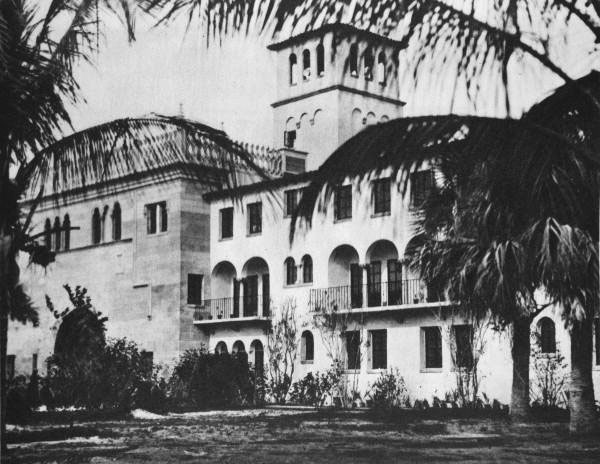
Cloister Inn, 1928

The resort first opened on February 6, 1926, as the 100-room Ritz-Carlton Cloister Inn. Originally designed and built by Boca Raton's city planner, architect Addison Mizner, who intended Camino Real to be the main street of his new city, it was to have been one of two hotels, with the other being an oceanfront hotel. However, the Ritz-Carlton Investment Corporation became involved in the project and wanted the oceanfront hotel redesigned, so construction began on the smaller and financially more viable 100-room inn on the west side of Lake Boca Raton.

Mizner's development company, hurt by the end of the Florida land boom of the 1920s and the 1926 Miami hurricane, declared bankruptcy in 1926. Philadelphia utility millionaire Clarence H. Geist bought its assets in 1927, and he expanded the Cloister Inn into the Boca Raton Club. The architectural firm Schultze and Weaver doubled the inn's size, and a cabana club was constructed where the "Addison on the Ocean" condominium building now stands.

Subsequently, the U.S. Army used the club as barracks during World War II. Touted by officials as "the most elegant barracks in history," it housed soldiers during the Boca Raton Army Air Field's operation.

After the war, the Boca Raton Club's ownership and ultimately name were changed. The Schine family purchased the club in 1944, renaming it the Boca Hotel and Club. While it was affectionately known on brochures as The Boca Raton, the resort was part of the identical Schine portfolio which included the Biltmore Hotel in Coral Gables and the McAllister Hotel in Miami.

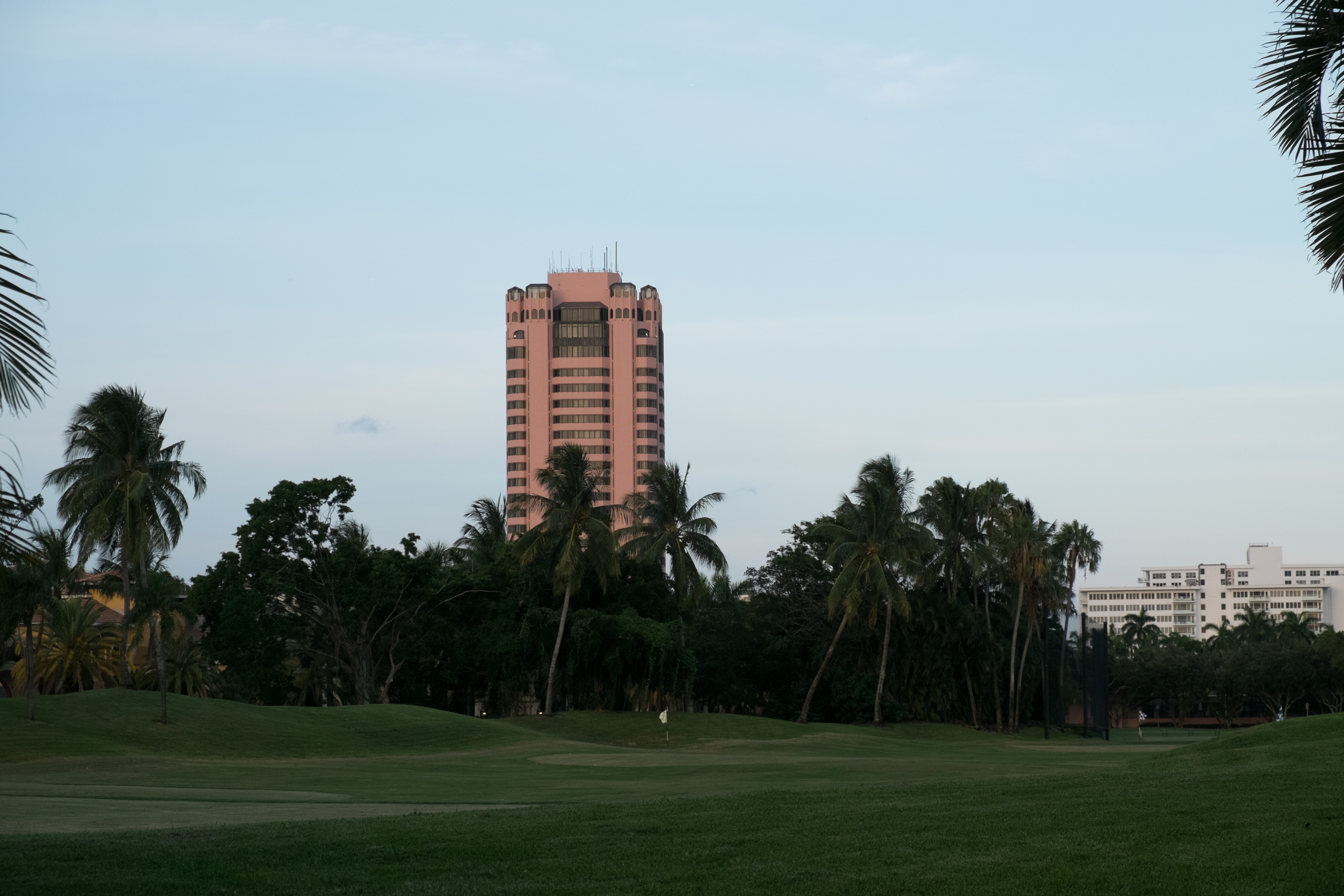
Tower overlooking the golf course

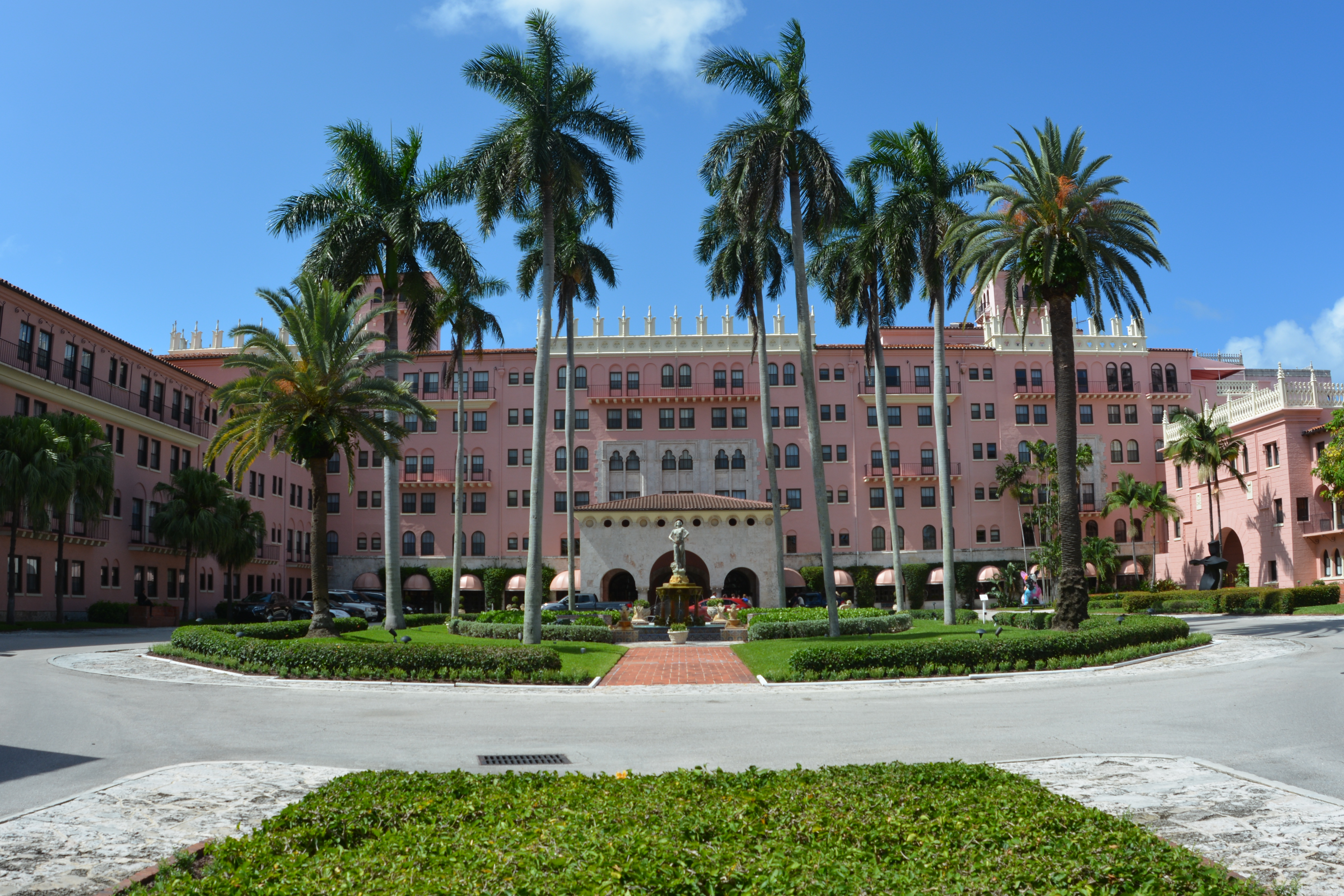
"Boca pink", taken in 2013

Arthur Vining Davis, whose brainchild was the Arvida Corporation, was responsible for modernizing the hotel. Opening the Boca Raton Club Tower in 1969, the building is still considerably taller than any other building in southern Palm Beach County. In addition, its famous "Boca pink" color has made it more famous than its stature of 300 feet (ninety-one meters) and twenty-seven floors, and it is commonly referred to as the "pink hotel". Arvida also constructed the resort's beach club in 1980, on the site that Mizner had intended the main hotel to stand on.

VMS Realty, Incorporated (Van Kampen, Morris, Stone), the successors to Arvida regarding ownership, purchased the property in 1983 and renamed it in 1988 as the Boca Raton Resort & Club.

In 2004, The Blackstone Group, a private investment firm, acquired the resort as part of its $1.25-billion acquisition of Boca Resorts, Inc., the publicly traded owner and operator of five Florida resorts. In February 2009, the Beach Club finished a $150 million renovation, while the cloister and tower rooms were redesigned in 2006. In May 2009, Hilton announced that the resort would be the 13th property to join The Waldorf Astoria Collection.

MSD Partners L.P., led by Michael Dell, purchased the Boca Raton Resort & Club on June 4, 2019. The new owners, as of 2020, have made a proposal to invest $75 million for renovations to the hotel, restaurants, and amenities. The property continued to be managed by Hilton under the Waldorf Astoria Hotels & Resorts brand until its departure in July 2021. As of July 12, 2021, the resort was renamed as The Boca Raton.
