= Seamen's Church Institute of Newport =

- U.S. National Register of Historic Places
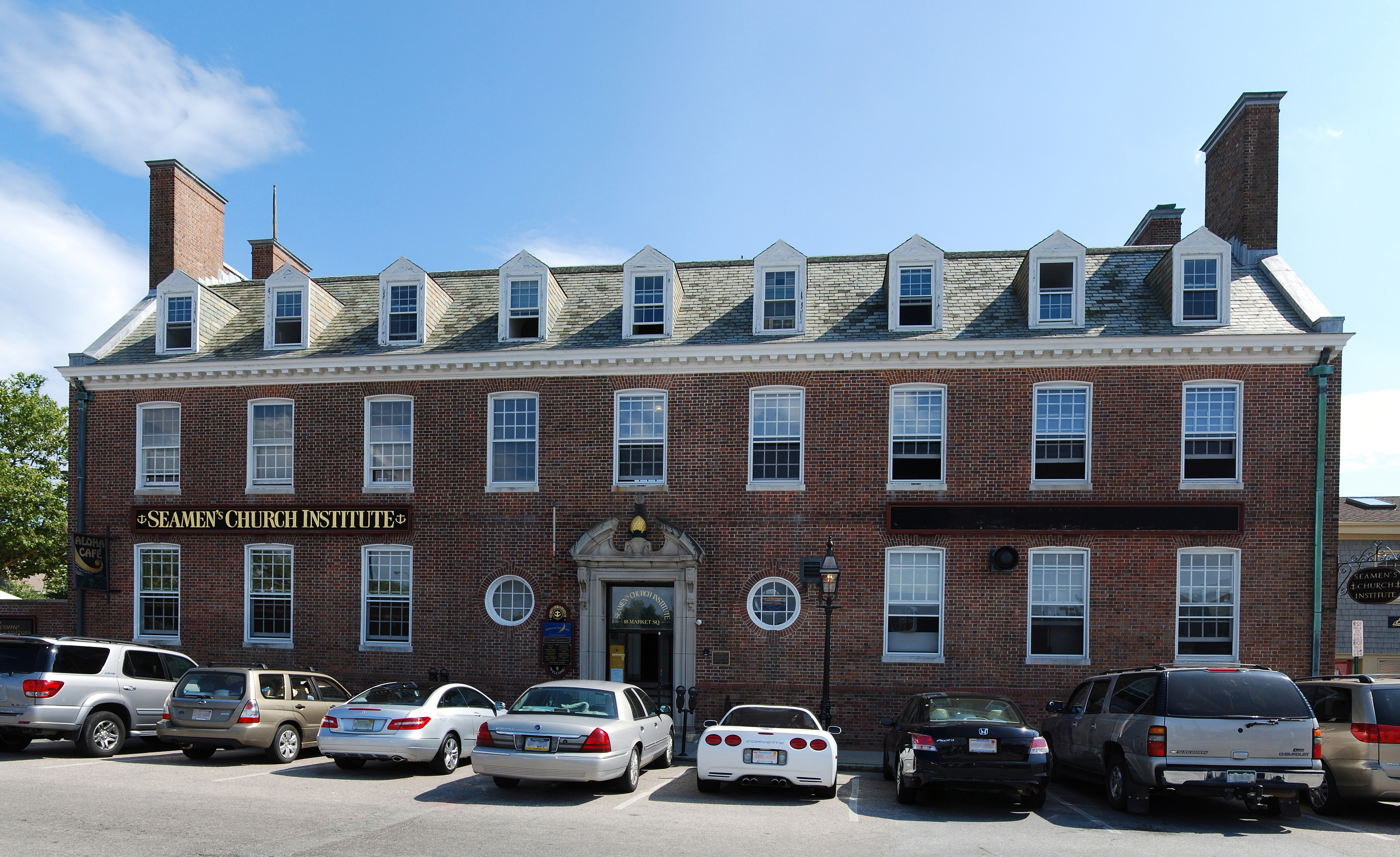

- Location within Rhode Island Location within the United States
- Location: 18 Market Square, Newport, Rhode Island
- Coordinates: 41°29′14″N 71°19′1″W
- Built: 1929
- Architect: Frederic Rhinelander King; Durr Friedley (muralist)
- Architectural style: Colonial Revival
- NRHP reference No.: 83000178
- Added to NRHP: August 4, 1983

The Seamen's Church Institute is a social service organization and historic building located in Newport, Rhode Island. Founded in 1919, the Institute's mission is to provide men and women of the sea and persons referred from the community a safe haven in which they may find comfort, recreation and benefit.

== History ==
The Church Institute building was built in 1930 by Edith and Maude Wetmore, daughters of Governor and Senator George Peabody Wetmore (owner of Chateau-sur-Mer). It contains an ornately painted chapel (the work of muralist Durr Freedley), as well as a small library, restaurant, laundry rooms, Wi-Fi and meeting rooms. The building, designed by the architect Frederic Rhinelander King in a Colonial Revival style, was added to the National Register of Historic Places in 1983.

== See also ==
- National Register of Historic Places listings in Newport County, Rhode Island
