= La Claridad =

Coordinates: 26.6999°N 80.0378°W

La Claridad was a mansion built on Golfview Road in Palm Beach, Florida in 1924 for utilities magnate Clarence H. Geist. It was designed by Palm Beach architect Marion Sims Wyeth. It used tile and wrought iron from Mizner Industries; other furnishings were brought from Spain. In 1948 architect Belford Shoumate turned it into two houses. After removing ten feet from the Geist’s original entrance hall, the living room became the focal point for a house rebuilt to the east; the original entry, loggia, staircase and dining room remained with the corner house to the west.

In 1948 industrialist Paul Butler, whose family had long been established in Palm Beach, bought one of the two houses, 16 Golfview Road. The house was later inherited in 1982 by his son Frank Osgood Butler II who resided there until his death in 2014.
