= Lockwood-Boynton House =

Historic house in Vermont, United States

- U.S. National Register of Historic Places
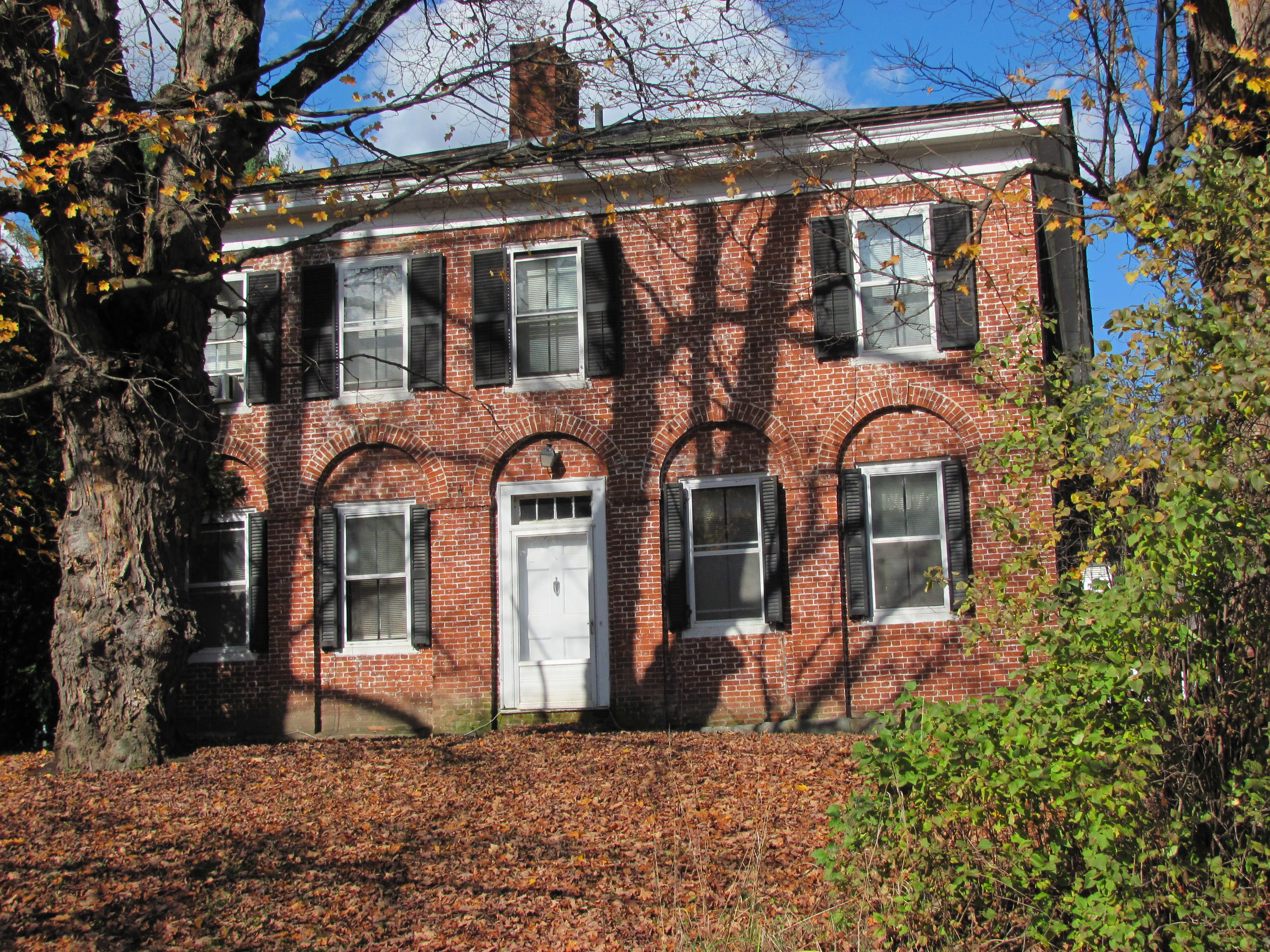

- Location within Vermont
- Location: 1 School St., North Springfield, Vermont
- Coordinates: 43°19′59″N 72°31′36″W
- Area: 0.5 acres (0.20 ha)
- Built: 1800
- Built by: Lockwood, Benoni, II
- Architectural style: Federal
- NRHP reference No.: 82001712
- Added to NRHP: May 4, 1982

The Lockwood-Boynton House is a historic house at 1 School Street in North Springfield, Vermont. Built c. 1800 and enlarged in 1813 by a local master builder, it is well-preserved example of Federal period architecture in brick, with distinctive colonnaded ground floor bays. It was listed on the National Register of Historic Places in 1982.

== Description and history ==
The Lockwood-Boynton House stands in North Springfield village, at the northwest corner of School and Main Streets. Its main block is roughly square, and covered by a hip roof with two interior chimneys. Three of its four walls are brick; that on the west is clapboarded, as is the wood-frame addition extending to the north. The main block has front facades facing both streets, each with five symmetrical bays. The ground floor windows and central doorways are set in slightly recessed round-arch panels, giving the house an arcaded appearance. The interior follows a central hall plan, and includes a full-width ballroom with coved plaster ceiling on the second floor.

The oldest brick portion of the house was built about 1800, and was the village's first tavern, located just north of the village green. It was a success as a center of social life in the village, and was enlarged in 1813 by Benoni Lockwood, owner of the area's first brickyard. Lockwood is credited with giving the house its present high-quality Federal period elements, although he was also responsible for subdividing the ballroom into bedrooms. In the 1870s, the house was owned by Durant Boynton, who owned a local sawmill, and served in both local and state government. In the 1970s the house was adapted for use as an elder care facility; alterations for later uses have generally preserved the building's historic fabric.

== See also ==
- National Register of Historic Places listings in Windsor County, Vermont
