= Durr Freedley =

American painter

- Born: Jesse Jacob Friedley; June 21, 1888; Indianapolis, Indiana
- Died: March 23, 1938 (aged 49); Arlington, Massachusetts
- Other names: Jesse Jacob Friedley, Durr Friedley
- Education: Harvard University
- Occupation: Artist
- Known for: Mural on the interior of Newport's Seamen's Institute Chapel
- Movement: Arts and Crafts; Art Deco

Durr Freedley (also known as Durr Friedley) was a portrait painter and muralist who enjoyed a noted but brief career in Newport, Rhode Island before his death in an automobile accident. He is perhaps best known for his mural on the interior of the Memorial Chapel of the Seamen's Church Institute of Newport.

== Personal life ==
The artist was born as Jesse Jacob Friedley in Indianapolis, Indiana. He earned his degree in Fine Arts from Harvard University in 1911. During his time at Harvard, Freedley was editor of the Harvard Lampoon.

At some point after 1918 and before 1932, Friedley changed the spelling of his surname to Freedley.

Freedley, who was homosexual, never married or had children.

== Early career ==
Freedley was a staff member at the Metropolitan Museum of Art between 1911 and 1917. His positions included Assistant Curator and Acting Curator. In 1917 Freedley was offered the post of curator when Wilhelm Valentiner resigned to join the German Army; he declined, and spent World War I painting camouflage on war planes.

== Paris ==
After the war Freedley moved to Paris, where he set up a portrait studio and socialized with artists and writers including Man Ray, Gertrude Stein and Ernest Hemingway. Among his works in Paris were drawings and paintings of performers at the famous La Revue Negre.

== Newport ==
Freedley was invited by socialite Mrs Hamilton Fish Webster to come to Newport in 1932. She offered him the opportunity to design and paint the interior of the Memorial Chapel of the Seamen's Church Institute of Newport, and continued to be a patron of his career.

Freedley remained in Newport until the end of his life, painting portraits of Newport socialites such as Maud Howe Elliott. During this time, Freedley is known to have traveled to Mississippi to paint portraits of black sharecroppers and field hands.

== Death and burial ==
Freedley was killed at age 46 in an automobile accident on March 23, 1938, in Lexington, Massachusetts. He broke both legs and was rushed to Symmes hospital in Arlington, and died there several hours later. It is possible that Freedley was the victim of an anti-gay attack. His body was shipped to his mother in Indianapolis for burial.

== Posthumous exhibitions ==
- Memorial exhibition at the John Herron Art Institute (now Indianapolis Museum of Art, November 1–30, 1938.
- Memorial exhibition at the Walker Galleries in New York City in 1939.
- "Durr Freedley: Newport's Forgotten Artist," Newport Museum of Art, September 26, 2015 - January 18, 2016.
