= Church of the Epiphany (Episcopal, Manhattan) =

Church in Manhattan, New York

- The Church of the Epiphany
- Church of the Epiphany
- Location: 351 East 74th Street; Manhattan, New York City
- Country: United States
- Denomination: Episcopal
- Website: epiphanynyc.org

History
- Founded: 1833
- Dedication: by Bishop William T. Manning

The Church of the Epiphany is an Episcopal church located at 351 East 74th Street, on the Upper East Side of Manhattan, New York City. The church was founded in 1833.

== History ==
The congregation held its first service on January 6, 1833, in a hall on the corner of Allen Street and Houston Street. It was the first church of the New York Protestant Episcopal City Mission Society. In 1834 it moved to a new building at 130 Stanton Street, between Essex Street and Norfolk Street. It incorporated in 1845 and became an independent parish.

In 1874 it moved to 228 East 50th Street, between Second and Third Avenues. In 1881, it moved to East 47th Street, west of Lexington Avenue.

The church at its location on the north-west corner of East 74th Street and York Avenue had its first service on October 15, 1939, and was dedicated by Bishop William T. Manning on October 29, 1939. Its rector at the time was the Rev. John Wallace Suter, Jr., who was also the Custodian of the Standard Book of Common Prayer. The church was consecrated on October 29, 1944.

The former rector, the Rev. Jennifer Anne Reddall, was elected the sixth Bishop of the Episcopal Diocese of Arizona in 2018 and consecrated in 2019.

== Former church building ==
The building at its former location at 1393 York Avenue,designed in the Norman Gothic style, was dedicated in 1939, and consecrated in 1944.

=== Architecture ===
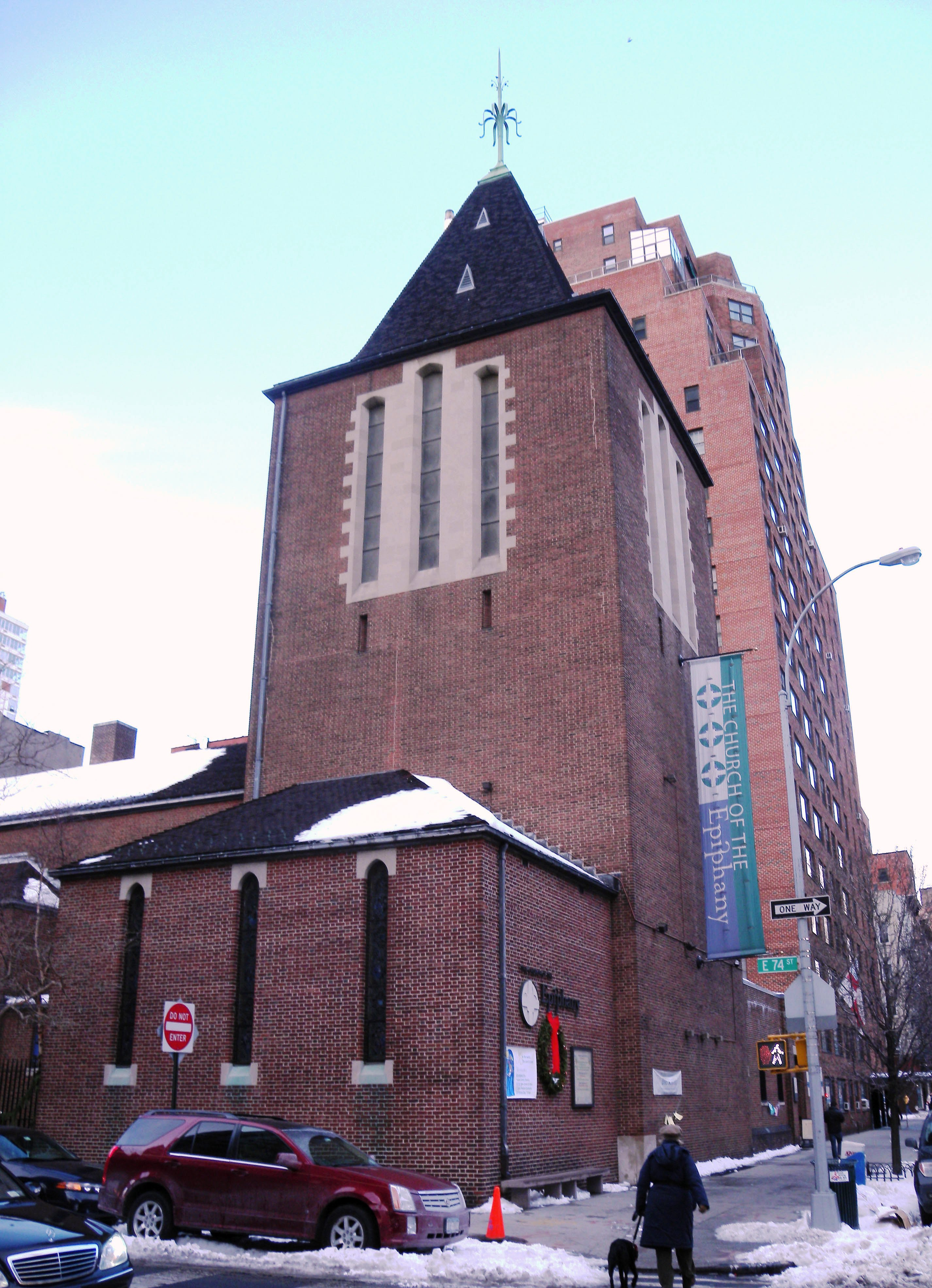

The former church was completed in 1939, and was designed in a simplified Norman Gothic style by the architectural firm Wyeth and King, with Eugene W. Mason as the associated architect.

In 2018, the church sold its York Avenue building and moved over several years to the former Jan Hus Presbyterian Church building.

=== Organ ===
The church's organ was built by the Aeolian-Skinner Organ Co. in 1962. Pipes of the Récit expressif and Positif divisions are located in a chamber on the side of the chancel, and the Hauptwerk and Pedal pipes are visible on cantilevered chests.
