= Marion Sims Wyeth =

American architect (1889–1982)

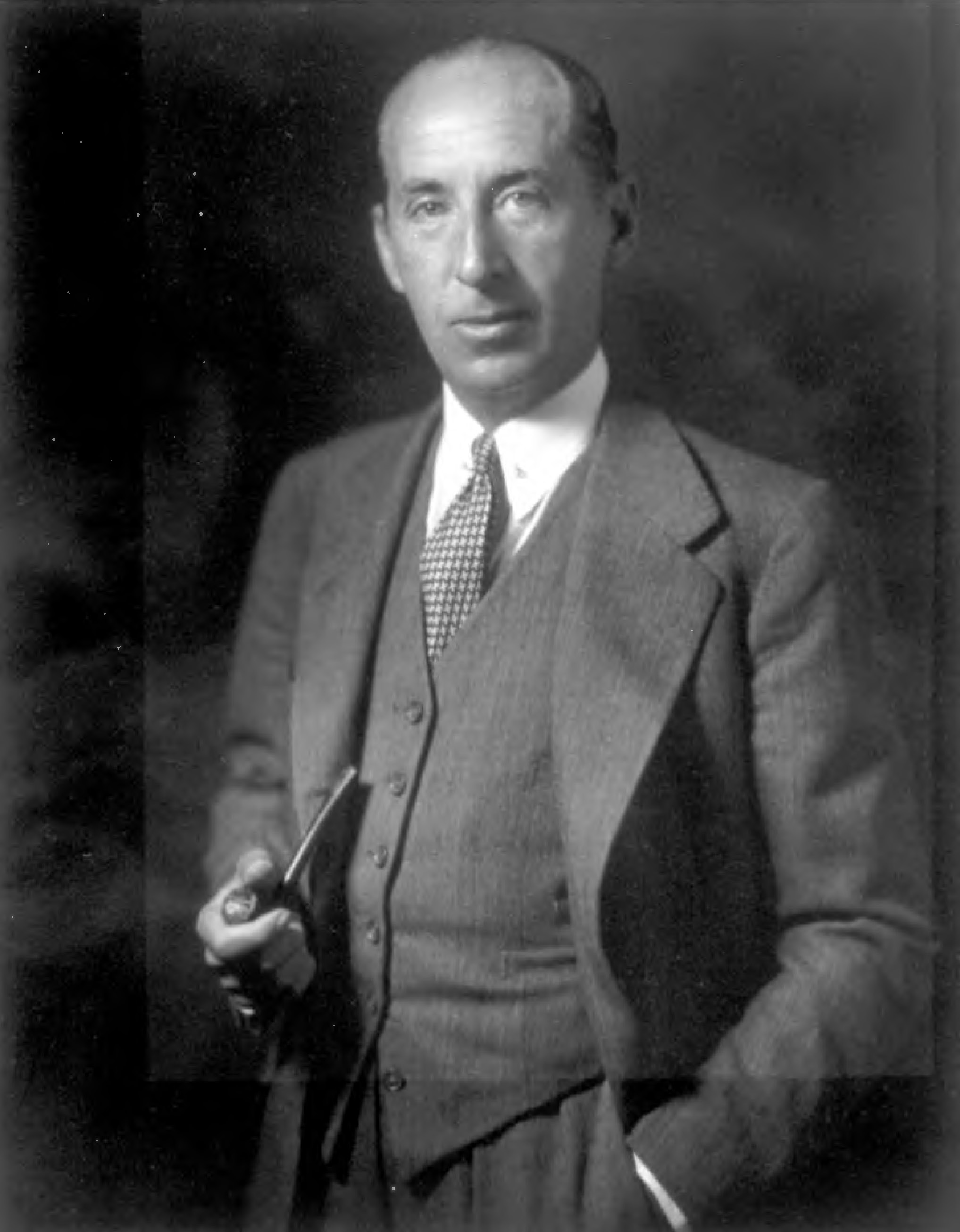
- Born: February 17, 1889; New York City, U.S.
- Died: February 4, 1982 (aged 92); West Palm Beach, Florida, U.S.
- Education: Princeton University; École nationale supérieure des Beaux-Arts
- Occupation: Architect
- Parent(s): John Allan Wyeth; Florence Nightingale Sims
- Relatives: J. Marion Sims (maternal grandfather); John Allan Wyeth (brother)

Marion Sims Wyeth /ˈwaɪ.əθ/ FAIA (February 17, 1889 – February 4, 1982) was an American architect known for his range in styles such as Art Deco, Mediterranean Revival, and classical Georgian, French, and Colonial. He designed numerous mansions in Palm Beach, Florida, during its gilded age. Wyeth was among a group of architects considered the "Big Five," along with John L. Volk, Addison Mizner, Maurice Fatio, and Howard Major, who defined Palm Beach style in the early twentieth century.

== Biography ==
Wyeth was born in New York City to Florence Nightingale Sims and Dr. John Allan Wyeth, who founded what is today the Stuyvesant Polyclinic Hospital in 1882 (which became Cabrini Medical Center). His grandfather J. Marion Sims founded the first Women's Hospital in the U.S. in 1855 (it is now part of Mount Sinai Morningside).

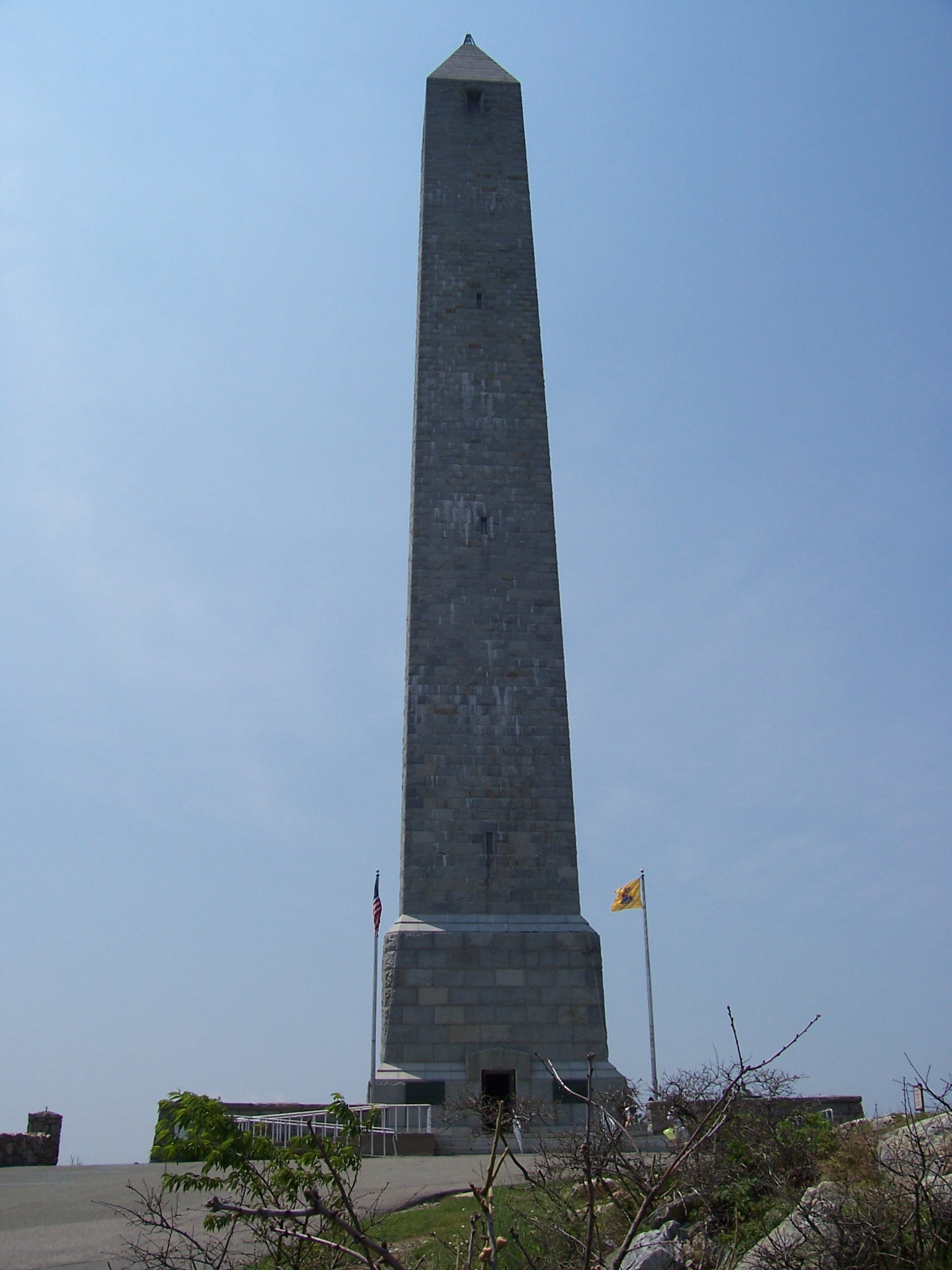
High Point monument

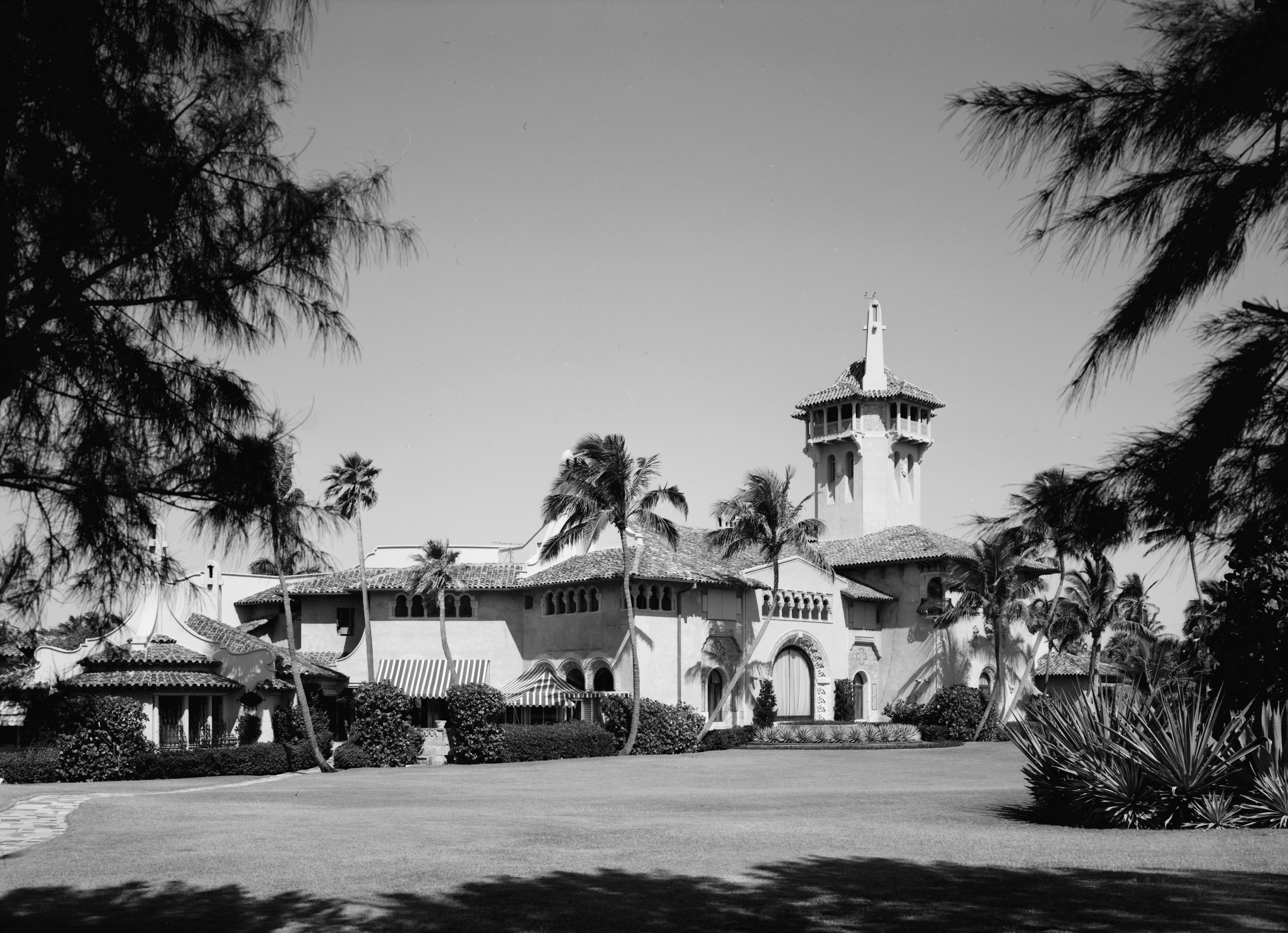
Mar-a-Lago

Wyeth attended Princeton University and studied at the École nationale supérieure des Beaux-Arts in Paris, where he was awarded the Prix Jean LeClerc in 1913 and the Deuxième Prix Rougevin in 1914.

Wyeth worked at Carrère & Hastings in New York City. He moved to Palm Beach, Florida, in 1919 where he founded the firm of Wyeth and King with his business partner Frederic Rhinelander King. He was the first Palm Beach architect to be elected a fellow of the American Institute of Architects.

Wyeth had over 700 commissions, many of which in Palm Beach, including Mar-a-Lago (1923-1927 with Joseph Urban). Other notable commissions include the Norton Museum of Art (1941) in West Palm Beach, the Florida Governors Mansion in Tallahassee, and Shangri La, Doris Duke’s house in Honolulu, Hawaii.

Wyeth died on February 4, 1982 in West Palm Beach, Florida. In 1993 his archives were donated to the Preservation Foundation of Palm Beach by architect Sidney Neil. The collection includes 13,000 architectural drawings and over 900 photographs.

== Projects ==
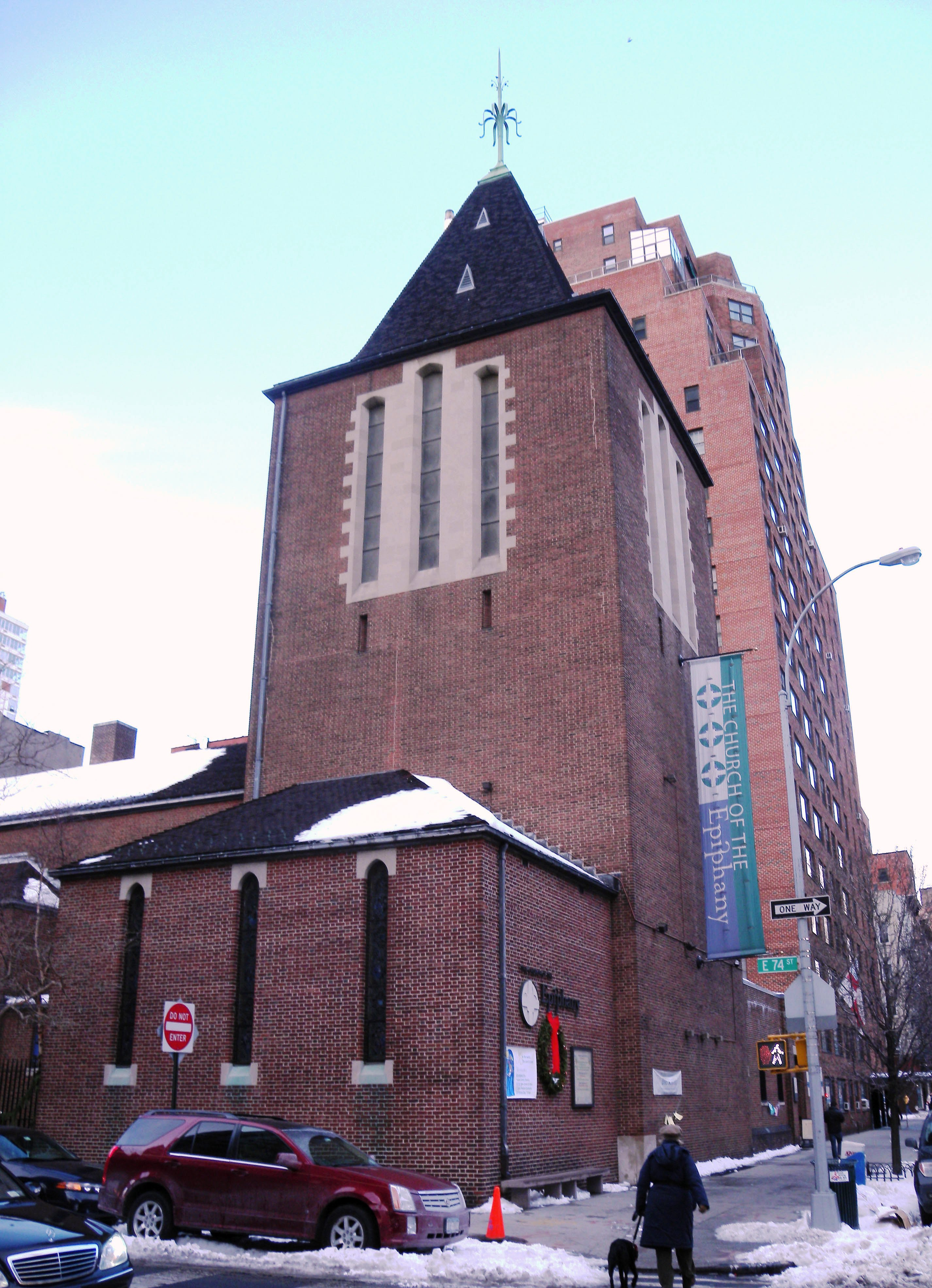
The Church of the Epiphany

- Mar-a-Lago, Palm Beach, Florida
- La Claridad, Palm Beach, Florida
- Norton Museum of Art, West Palm Beach, Florida
- High Point Monument, New Jersey and associated Grey Rock Inn
- Florida Governor's Mansion, Tallahassee, Florida
- Palm Beach Day Academy, Palm Beach, Florida
- Shangri La, Doris Duke's home in Honolulu
- The Church of the Epiphany on New York City's Upper East Side
- Dutch South African Village, Coral Gables, Florida
