= List of Scottish statutory instruments =

This is a list of Scottish statutory instruments by year.

== Statutory instruments by year ==
- List of Scottish statutory instruments, 1999

=== 2000–09 ===
- List of Scottish statutory instruments, 2000
- List of Scottish statutory instruments, 2001
- List of Scottish statutory instruments, 2002
- List of Scottish statutory instruments, 2003
- List of Scottish statutory instruments, 2004
- List of Scottish statutory instruments, 2005
- List of Scottish statutory instruments, 2006
- List of Scottish statutory instruments, 2007
- List of Scottish statutory instruments, 2008
- List of Scottish statutory instruments, 2009

=== 2010–19 ===
- List of Scottish statutory instruments, 2010
- List of Scottish statutory instruments, 2011
- List of Scottish statutory instruments, 2012
- List of Scottish statutory instruments, 2013
- List of Scottish statutory instruments, 2014
- List of Scottish statutory instruments, 2015
- List of Scottish statutory instruments, 2016
- List of Scottish statutory instruments, 2017
- List of Scottish statutory instruments, 2018
- List of Scottish statutory instruments, 2019

=== 2020–present ===
- List of Scottish statutory instruments, 2020
- List of Scottish statutory instruments, 2021
- List of Scottish statutory instruments, 2022
- List of Scottish statutory instruments, 2023
- List of Scottish statutory instruments, 2024
