= List of legislation in the United Kingdom =

This is a list of lists of legislation in the United Kingdom

== Acts ==
This is a list of lists of acts of the several Parliaments and Assemblies that exist or formerly existed in the United Kingdom and the former Kingdoms of Great Britain, England, Scotland and Ireland, grouped by the Parliament or Assembly that passed them. It also contains information on series of acts of similar purpose.

For acts of the Parliament of the United Kingdom established in 1801, see List of acts of the Parliament of the United Kingdom.

For acts of the Parliaments abolished in 1707 and 1801 by the Acts of Union 1707 and Acts of Union 1800, see:

- List of acts of the Parliament of England (1225–1707)
- List of acts of the Parliament of Scotland (1424–1707)
- List of acts of the Parliament of Ireland
- List of acts of the Parliament of Great Britain (1707–1800)

See also:

- Lists of acts of the Scottish Parliament for the devolved Parliament established by the Scotland Act 1998
- List of acts of the Parliament of Northern Ireland for the 1921–1972 Home Rule Parliament
- List of acts of the Northern Ireland Assembly for the devolved Assembly established in 1999
- List of acts of Senedd Cymru for the devolved Assembly and Parliament

The original acts of Parliament are held by the Parliamentary Archives. Legislation.gov.uk provides the revised editions of the legislation of the United Kingdom.

Note that some acts consolidate and reorganise prior acts; these are called consolidation acts.

=== Series ===
- Inclosure acts (various, mainly 1750 to 1860)
- Factory Acts (1802, 1833, 1844, 1847, 1850, 1867, 1874, 1891)
- Regency Acts
- Witchcraft Acts (various)

== Statutes ==
- List of English statutes

== Measures ==
- List of measures of Senedd Cymru
- List of measures of the Northern Ireland Assembly (1973)
- List of Church of England measures

== Instruments ==
- List of statutory instruments of the United Kingdom
- List of Scottish statutory instruments

== Rules ==
- List of statutory rules of Northern Ireland

== Orders ==
- List of orders in Council for Northern Ireland
- List of regulatory reform orders

== Statutory rules and orders ==
- List of statutory rules and orders of the United Kingdom
- List of statutory rules and orders of Northern Ireland

== See also ==
- Act of Parliament (United Kingdom)
- Halsbury's Statutes
