= List of Scottish statutory instruments, 2016 =

This is a complete list of Scottish statutory instruments in 2016.

== 1-100 ==
- The A84 Trunk Road (Balquhidder Station) (50 mph Speed Limit) Order 2016 ( S.S.I. 2016 No. 1)
- The Public Bodies (Joint Working) (Integration Joint Board Establishment) (Scotland) Amendment Order 2016 (S.S.I. 2016 No. 2)
- The Health Boards (Membership and Procedure) (Scotland) Amendment Regulations 2016 (S.S.I. 2016 No. 3)
- The Community Right to Buy (Scotland) Amendment Regulations 2016 (S.S.I. 2016 No. 4)
- The M90/A90 Edinburgh - Fraserburgh Trunk Road (Forth Road Bridge) (Temporary Prohibition on Use of Road) Order 2016 (S.S.I. 2016 No. 5)
- The Local Governance (Scotland) Act 2004 (Remuneration) Amendment Regulations 2016 (S.S.I. 2016 No. 6)
- The Scottish Local Government Elections Amendment Order 2016 (S.S.I. 2016 No. 7)
- The Representation of the People (Absent Voting at Local Government Elections) (Scotland) Amendment Regulations 2016 (S.S.I. 2016 No. 8)
- The Scottish Parliament Elections (Regional Returning Officers and Constituency Returning Officers) Order 2016 (S.S.I. 2016 No. 9)
- The Scottish Parliament Elections (Returning Officer Fees and Charges) Regulations 2016 (S.S.I. 2016 No. 10)
- The Serious Crime Act 2015 (Commencement No. 1 and Saving Provision) (Scotland) Regulations 2016 (S.S.I. 2016 No. 11 (C. 1))
- The Sea Fish (Prohibited Methods of Fishing) (Firth of Clyde) Order 2016 (S.S.I. 2016 No. 12)
- The Courts Reform (Scotland) Act 2014 (Commencement No. 6 and Transitional Provisions) Order 2016 (S.S.I. 2016 No. 13 (C. 2))
- The Water Resources (Scotland) Act 2013 (Commencement No. 3) Order 2016 (S.S.I. 2016 No. 14 (C. 3))
- The Public Bodies (Joint Working) (Prescribed Health Board Functions) (Scotland) Amendment Regulations 2016 (S.S.I. 2016 No. 15)
- The Named Persons (Training, Qualifications, Experience and Position) (Scotland) Order 2016 (S.S.I. 2016 No. 16)
- The Child's Plan (Scotland) Order 2016 (S.S.I. 2016 No. 17)
- The Fireworks (Scotland) Amendment Regulations 2016 (S.S.I. 2016 No. 18)
- The Water Environment (Remedial Measures) (Scotland) Regulations 2016 (S.S.I. 2016 No. 19)
- The Public Appointments and Public Bodies etc. (Scotland) Act 2003 (Treatment of Community Justice Scotland as Specified Authority) Order 2016 (S.S.I. 2016 No. 20)
- The Adoption and Children (Scotland) Act 2007 (Amendment of the Children (Scotland) Act 1995) Order 2016 (S.S.I. 2016 No. 21)
- The Public Services Reform (Scotland) Act 2010 (Commencement No. 7) Order 2016 (S.S.I. 2016 No. 22 (C. 4))
- The National Assistance (Sums for Personal Requirements) (Scotland) Regulations 2016 (S.S.I. 2016 No. 23)
- The Products Containing Meat etc. (Scotland) Amendment Regulations 2016 (S.S.I. 2016 No. 24)
- The National Assistance (Assessment of Resources) Amendment (Scotland) Regulations 2016 (S.S.I. 2016 No. 25)
- The Healthcare Improvement Scotland (Fees) Regulations 2016 (S.S.I. 2016 No. 26)
- The Protection of Vulnerable Groups (Scotland) Act 2007 (Prescribed Purposes for Consideration of Suitability) Regulations 2016 (S.S.I. 2016 No. 27)
- The Community Empowerment (Scotland) Act 2015 (Consequential Modifications and Savings) Order 2016 (S.S.I. 2016 No. 28)
- The A725/A726 Trunk Road (Shawhead) (Temporary Prohibition of Specified Turn) Order 2016 (S.S.I. 2016 No. 29)
- The Procurement Reform (Scotland) Act 2014 (Commencement No. 3 and Transitional Provisions) Order 2016 (S.S.I. 2016 No. 30 (C. 5))
- The Local Government etc. (Scotland) Act 1994 (Commencement No. 9) Order 2016 (S.S.I. 2016 No. 31 (C. 6))
- The Local Government Pension Scheme (Scotland) Amendment Regulations 2016 (S.S.I. 2016 No. 32)
- The Less Favoured Area Support Scheme (Scotland) Amendment Regulations 2016 (S.S.I. 2016 No. 33)
- The South West Scotland Trunk Roads (Temporary Prohibitions of Traffic and Overtaking and Temporary Speed Restrictions) (No. 1) Order 2016 (S.S.I. 2016 No. 34)
- The South East Scotland Trunk Roads (Temporary Prohibitions of Traffic and Overtaking and Temporary Speed Restrictions) (No. 1) Order 2016 (S.S.I. 2016 No. 35)
- The North West Scotland Trunk Roads (Temporary Prohibitions of Traffic and Overtaking and Temporary Speed Restrictions) (No. 1) Order 2016 (S.S.I. 2016 No. 36)
- The North East Scotland Trunk Roads (Temporary Prohibitions of Traffic and Overtaking and Temporary Speed Restrictions) (No. 1) Order 2016 (S.S.I. 2016 No. 37)
- The Nature Conservation (Scotland) Act 2004 (Authorised Operations) Order 2016 (S.S.I. 2016 No. 38)
- The Pollution Prevention and Control (Scotland) Amendment Regulations 2016 (S.S.I. 2016 No. 39)
- The Waste Management Licensing (Scotland) Amendment Regulations 2016 (S.S.I. 2016 No. 40)
- The Specified Diseases (Notification) Amendment (Scotland) Order 2016 (S.S.I. 2016 No. 41)
- The Reservoirs (Scotland) Act 2011 (Commencement No. 5 and Transitional Provision) Order 2016 (S.S.I. 2016 No. 42 (C. 7))
- The Reservoirs (Scotland) Regulations 2016 (S.S.I. 2016 No. 43)
- The Children and Young People (Scotland) Act 2014 (Relevant Services in relation to Children at Risk of Becoming Looked After etc.) Order 2016 (S.S.I. 2016 No. 44)
- The Secure Accommodation (Scotland) Amendment Regulations 2016 (S.S.I. 2016 No. 45)
- The Carbon Accounting Scheme (Scotland) Amendment Regulations 2016 (S.S.I. 2016 No. 46)
- The Public Contracts (Scotland) Amendment Regulations 2016 (S.S.I. 2016 No. 47)
- The Water Act 2014 (Commencement No. 2) (Scotland) Order 2016 (S.S.I. 2016 No. 48 (C. 8))
- The Utilities Contracts (Scotland) Regulations 2016 (S.S.I. 2016 No. 49)
- The Orkney Islands (Landing of Crabs and Lobsters) Order 2016 (S.S.I. 2016 No. 50)
- The Police Service of Scotland (Senior Officers) (Performance) Regulations 2016 (S.S.I. 2016 No. 51)
- The Water and Sewerage Services Licences (Cross-Border Applications) (Scotland) Order 2016 (S.S.I. 2016 No. 52)
- The National Health Service (General Dental Services) (Scotland) Amendment Regulations 2016 (S.S.I. 2016 No. 53)
- The Dog Fouling (Fixed Penalty) (Scotland) Order 2016 (S.S.I. 2016 No. 54)
- The Scottish Sentencing Council (Submission of Business Plan) Order 2016 (S.S.I. 2016 No. 55)
- The Regulation of Investigatory Powers (Prescription of Ranks and Positions) (Scotland) Order 2016 (S.S.I. 2016 No. 56)
- Not Allocated (S.S.I. 2016 No. 57)
- The Microchipping of Dogs (Scotland) Regulations 2016 (S.S.I. 2016 No. 58)
- The Personal Injuries (NHS Charges) (Amounts) (Scotland) Amendment Regulations 2016 (S.S.I. 2016 No. 59)
- The Children and Young People (Scotland) Act 2014 (Commencement No. 11) Order 2016 (S.S.I. 2016 No. 60 (C. 9))
- The Children's Hearings (Scotland) Act 2011 (Safeguarders Panel) Amendment Regulations 2016 (S.S.I. 2016 No. 61)
- The Teachers’ Superannuation and Pension Scheme (Scotland) Amendment Regulations 2016 (S.S.I. 2016 No. 62)
- The Croft House Grant (Scotland) Regulations 2016 (S.S.I. 2016 No. 63)
- The Registration Services (Fees, etc.) (Scotland) Amendment Regulations 2016 (S.S.I. 2016 No. 64)
- The Concession Contracts (Scotland) Regulations 2016 (S.S.I. 2016 No. 65)
- The Gender Recognition (Marriage and Civil Partnership Registration) (Scotland) Regulations 2016 (S.S.I. 2016 No. 66)
- The Gender Recognition (Marriage and Civil Partnership Registration) (Modification) (Scotland) Order 2016 (S.S.I. 2016 No. 67)
- The Seed (Licensing and Enforcement etc.) (Scotland) Regulations 2016 (S.S.I. 2016 No. 68)
- The Seed (Fees) (Scotland) Regulations 2016 (S.S.I. 2016 No. 69)
- The Building (Scotland) Amendment Regulations 2016 (S.S.I. 2016 No. 70)
- The Building (Energy Performance of Buildings) (Scotland) Amendment Regulations 2016 (S.S.I. 2016 No. 71)
- The Disabled Persons (Badges for Motor Vehicles) (Scotland) Amendment Regulations 2016 (S.S.I. 2016 No. 72)
- The Civic Government (Scotland) Act 1982 (Metal Dealers and Itinerant Metal Dealers) (Verification of Name and Address) Regulations 2016 (S.S.I. 2016 No. 73)
- The Local Government Pension Scheme (Management and Investment of Funds) (Scotland) Amendment Regulations 2016 (S.S.I. 2016 No. 74)
- The Police Pensions (Miscellaneous Amendments) (Scotland) Regulations 2016 (S.S.I. 2016 No. 75)
- The Charities Accounts (Scotland) Amendment Regulations 2016 (S.S.I. 2016 No. 76)
- The Firefighters’ Compensation and Pension Schemes (Scotland) Amendment Order 2016 (S.S.I. 2016 No. 77)
- The Firefighters’ Pension Scheme (Scotland) Amendment Regulations 2016 (S.S.I. 2016 No. 78)
- The Firemen's Pension Scheme (Amendment) (Scotland) Order 2016 (S.S.I. 2016 No. 79)
- The National Assistance (Assessment of Resources) Amendment (Scotland) (No. 2) Regulations 2016 (S.S.I. 2016 No. 80)
- The Council Tax Reduction (Scotland) Amendment Regulations 2016 (S.S.I. 2016 No. 81)
- The Education (Fees, Awards and Student Support) (Miscellaneous Amendments) (Scotland) Regulations 2016 (S.S.I. 2016 No. 82)
- The Plant Health (Scotland) Amendment Order 2016 (revoked) (S.S.I. 2016 No. 83)
- The Country of Origin of Certain Meats (Scotland) Regulations 2016 (S.S.I. 2016 No. 84)
- The Air Weapons and Licensing (Scotland) Act 2015 (Commencement No. 2 and Transitional Provisions) Order 2016 (S.S.I. 2016 No. 85 (C. 10))
- The Healthcare Improvement Scotland (Delegation of Functions) Order 2016 (S.S.I. 2016 No. 86)
- The National Assistance (Sums for Personal Requirements) (Scotland) (No. 2) Regulations 2016 (S.S.I. 2016 No. 87)
- The Wester Ross Marine Conservation Order 2016 (S.S.I. 2016 No. 88)
- The Restriction of Liberty Order etc. (Scotland) Amendment Regulations 2016 (S.S.I. 2016 No. 89)
- The Loch Sunart to the Sound of Jura Marine Conservation Order 2016 (S.S.I. 2016 No. 90)
- The Rehabilitation of Offenders Act 1974 (Exclusions and Exceptions) (Scotland) Amendment Order 2016 (S.S.I. 2016 No. 91)
- The Continuing Care (Scotland) Amendment Order 2016 (S.S.I. 2016 No. 92)
- The Scottish Landfill Tax (Qualifying Material) Order 2016 (S.S.I. 2016 No. 93)
- The Scottish Landfill Tax (Standard Rate and Lower Rate) Order 2016 (S.S.I. 2016 No. 94)
- The Criminal Justice (Scotland) Act 2016 (Commencement No. 1 and Saving Provision) Order 2016 (S.S.I. 2016 No. 95 (C. 11))
- The Scottish Fire and Rescue Service (Appointment of Chief Inspector) Order 2016 (S.S.I. 2016 No. 96)
- The National Health Service Pension Scheme (Scotland) Amendment Regulations 2016 (S.S.I. 2016 No. 97)
- The National Health Service Superannuation Scheme (Miscellaneous Amendments) (Scotland) Regulations 2016 (S.S.I. 2016 No. 98)
- The Water Environment (Amendment of Part IIA of the Environmental Protection Act 1990: Contaminated Land) (Scotland) Regulations 2016 (S.S.I. 2016 No. 99)
- Act of Sederunt (Fees of Sheriff Officers) 2016 (S.S.I. 2016 No. 100)

== 101-200 ==
- Act of Sederunt (Fees of Messengers-at-Arms) 2016 (S.S.I. 2016 No. 101)
- Act of Sederunt (Rules of the Court of Session 1994 and Sheriff Court Rules Amendment) (Miscellaneous) 2016 (S.S.I. 2016 No. 102)
- Act of Adjournal (Criminal Procedure Rules 1996 Amendment) (Miscellaneous) 2016 (S.S.I. 2016 No. 103)
- The Common Agricultural Policy (Direct Payments etc.) (Scotland) Amendment Regulations 2016 (S.S.I. 2016 No. 104)
- The M90/A90 Edinburgh - Fraserburgh Trunk Road (Forth Road Bridge) (Temporary Prohibition on Use of Road) (No. 2) Order 2016 (S.S.I. 2016 No. 105)
- The M8/A8 Trunk Road (Chapelhall) (Temporary Prohibition of Specified Turn) Order 2016 (S.S.I. 2016 No. 106)
- The Welfare Funds (Scotland) Regulations 2016 (S.S.I. 2016 No. 107)
- The South West Scotland Trunk Roads (Temporary Prohibitions of Traffic and Overtaking and Temporary Speed Restrictions) (No. 2) Order 2016 (S.S.I. 2016 No. 108)
- The South East Scotland Trunk Roads (Temporary Prohibitions of Traffic and Overtaking and Temporary Speed Restrictions) (No. 2) Order 2016 (S.S.I. 2016 No. 109)
- The North East Scotland Trunk Roads (Temporary Prohibitions of Traffic and Overtaking and Temporary Speed Restrictions) (No. 2) Order 2016 (S.S.I. 2016 No. 110)
- The A77 Trunk Road (Ballantrae and Girvan) (Temporary Prohibition on Waiting, Loading and Unloading) Order 2016 (S.S.I. 2016 No. 111)
- The North West Scotland Trunk Roads (Temporary Prohibitions of Traffic and Overtaking and Temporary Speed Restrictions) (No. 2) Order 2016 (S.S.I. 2016 No. 112)
- The Non-Domestic Rate (Scotland) Order 2016 (S.S.I. 2016 No. 113)
- The Non-Domestic Rates (Levying) (Scotland) Regulations 2016 (S.S.I. 2016 No. 114)
- The Conservation of Salmon (Scotland) Regulations 2016 (S.S.I. 2016 No. 115)
- The Salmon Carcass Tagging (Scotland) Regulations 2016 (S.S.I. 2016 No. 116)
- The Tweed Regulation (Salmon Carcass Tagging) Order 2016 (S.S.I. 2016 No. 117)
- The Tweed Regulation (Salmon Conservation) Order 2016 (S.S.I. 2016 No. 118)
- The Non-Domestic Rates (Enterprise Areas) (Scotland) Regulations 2016 (S.S.I. 2016 No. 119)
- The Non-Domestic Rates (Steel Sites) (Scotland) Regulations 2016 (S.S.I. 2016 No. 120)
- The Non-Domestic Rates (Renewable Energy Generation Relief) (Scotland) Amendment Regulations 2016 (S.S.I. 2016 No. 121)
- The Non-Domestic Rates (Telecommunication Installations) (Scotland) Regulations 2016 (S.S.I. 2016 No. 122)
- The Local Authority (Capital Finance and Accounting) (Scotland) Regulations 2016 (S.S.I. 2016 No. 123)
- The Non-Domestic Rating (Unoccupied Property) (Scotland) Amendment Regulations 2016 (S.S.I. 2016 No. 124)
- The Concession Contracts (Scotland) Amendment Regulations 2016 (S.S.I. 2016 No. 125)
- The Town and Country Planning (General Permitted Development) (Scotland) Amendment Order 2016 (S.S.I. 2016 No. 126)
- The National Health Service (Optical Charges and Payments) (Scotland) Amendment Regulations 2016 (S.S.I. 2016 No. 127)
- The Human Trafficking and Exploitation (Scotland) Act 2015 (Commencement No. 1 and Transitory Provisions) Regulations 2016 (S.S.I. 2016 No. 128 (C. 12))
- The Non-Domestic Rates (Telecommunications and Canals) (Scotland) Amendment Order 2016 (S.S.I. 2016 No. 129)
- The Air Weapons and Licensing (Scotland) Act 2015 (Commencement No. 3 and Transitional Provisions) Order 2016 (S.S.I. 2016 No. 130 (C. 13))
- The Prisons and Young Offenders Institutions (Scotland) Amendment Rules 2016 (S.S.I. 2016 No. 131)
- The Air Weapons and Licensing (Scotland) Act 2015 (Commencement No. 4, Transitional and Saving Provisions) Order 2016 (S.S.I. 2016 No. 132 (C. 14))
- The Letting Agent Code of Practice (Scotland) Regulations 2016 (S.S.I. 2016 No. 133)
- The A85 Trunk Road (East Huntingtower to Lochty) (40 mph Speed Limit) Order 2016 (S.S.I. 2016 No. 134)
- The Local Government Finance (Scotland) Order 2016 (S.S.I. 2016 No. 135)
- The Advice and Assistance and Civil Legal Aid (Financial Conditions and Contributions) (Scotland) Amendment Regulations 2016 (S.S.I. 2016 No. 136)
- Act of Adjournal (Criminal Procedure Rules 1996 Amendment) (No. 2) (Serious Crime Prevention Orders) 2016 (S.S.I. 2016 No. 137)
- The M77/A77 Trunk Road (Maybole Bypass) (Side Roads) Order 2016 (S.S.I. 2016 No. 138)
- The Freedom of Information (Scotland) Act 2002 (Designation of Persons as Scottish Public Authorities) Order 2016 (S.S.I. 2016 No. 139)
- The Bankruptcy and Debt Advice (Scotland) Act 2014 (Consequential Provisions) Order 2016 (S.S.I. 2016 No. 140)
- The Public Services Reform (Insolvency) (Scotland) Order 2016 (S.S.I. 2016 No. 141)
- The Courts Reform (Scotland) Act 2014 (Consequential Provisions) Order 2016 (S.S.I. 2016 No. 142)
- The M77/A77 Trunk Road (Maybole Bypass) (Trunking and Detrunking) Order 2016 (S.S.I. 2016 No. 143)
- The A78 Trunk Road (Inverkip Street, Greenock) (Temporary Prohibition on Use of Road) Order 2016 (S.S.I. 2016 No. 144)
- The Procurement (Scotland) Regulations 2016 (S.S.I. 2016 No. 145)
- The Assessment of Energy Performance of Non-domestic Buildings (Scotland) Regulations 2016 (S.S.I. 2016 No. 146)
- The Rehabilitation of Offenders Act 1974 (Exclusions and Exceptions) (Scotland) Amendment (No. 2) Order 2016 (S.S.I. 2016 No. 147)
- The National Health Service (Scotland) Act 1978 (Independent Clinic) Amendment Order 2016 (S.S.I. 2016 No. 148)
- The A78 Trunk Road (Greenock) (30 mph Speed Limit and Part-Time 20 mph Speed Limit) Order 2016 (S.S.I. 2016 No. 149)
- The Public Bodies (Joint Working) (Scotland) Act 2014 (Consequential Modifications) Order 2016 (S.S.I. 2016 No. 150)
- The Children and Young People (Scotland) Act 2014 (Modification of Schedules 2 and 3) Order 2016 (S.S.I. 2016 No. 151)
- The Children and Young People (Scotland) Act 2014 (Part 4 and Part 5 Complaints) Order 2016 (S.S.I. 2016 No. 152)
- The Kinship Care Assistance (Scotland) Order 2016 (S.S.I. 2016 No. 153)
- The Scotland's Adoption Register Regulations 2016 (S.S.I. 2016 No. 154)
- The Scottish Public Services Ombudsman Act 2002 Amendment Order 2016 (S.S.I. 2016 No. 155)
- The Lochboisdale and Gasay Port (Harbour Empowerment) Order 2016 (S.S.I. 2016 No. 156)
- The Public Services Reform (Social Work Complaints Procedure) (Scotland) Order 2016 (S.S.I. 2016 No. 157)
- The Budget (Scotland) Act 2015 Amendment Regulations 2016 (S.S.I. 2016 No. 158)
- The Equality Act 2010 (Specific Duties) (Scotland) Amendment Regulations 2016 (S.S.I. 2016 No. 159)
- The M8/A8 Trunk Road (Shotts to Newhouse) (Temporary Prohibition of Traffic and Overtaking and Speed Restriction) Order 2016 (S.S.I. 2016 No. 160)
- The Reservoirs (Enforcement etc.) (Scotland) Order 2016 (S.S.I. 2016 No. 161)
- The Air Quality (Scotland) Amendment Regulations 2016 (S.S.I. 2016 No. 162)
- The A85 Trunk Road (Drummond Street, Comrie) (Temporary Prohibition On Use of Road) Order 2016 (S.S.I. 2016 No. 163)
- The South West Scotland Trunk Roads (Temporary Prohibitions of Traffic and Overtaking and Temporary Speed Restrictions) (No. 3) Order 2016 (S.S.I. 2016 No. 164)
- The South East Scotland Trunk Roads (Temporary Prohibitions of Traffic and Overtaking and Temporary Speed Restrictions) (No. 3) Order 2016 (S.S.I. 2016 No. 165)
- The North West Scotland Trunk Roads (Temporary Prohibitions of Traffic and Overtaking and Temporary Speed Restrictions) (No. 3) Order 2016 (S.S.I. 2016 No. 166)
- The North East Scotland Trunk Roads (Temporary Prohibitions of Traffic and Overtaking and Temporary Speed Restrictions) (No. 3) Order 2016 (S.S.I. 2016 No. 167)
- The A82 Trunk Road (Glenurquhart Road, Inverness) (Temporary Prohibition on Use of Road and Temporary 10 mph and 30 mph Speed Restrictions) Order 2016 (S.S.I. 2016 No. 168)
- The M8/A8 Trunk Road (Port Glasgow) (Temporary Prohibition of Specified Turns) Order 2016 (S.S.I. 2016 No. 169)
- he M8/A8 (Newhouse to Baillieston) A725 (Raith to Shawhead) Trunk Roads (Temporary Prohibitions of Traffic and Overtaking and Temporary Speed Restrictions) Order 2016 (S.S.I. 2016 No. 170)
- The South West Scotland Trunk Roads (Temporary Prohibitions of Traffic and Overtaking and Temporary Speed Restrictions) (No. 4) Order 2016 (S.S.I. 2016 No. 171)
- The South East Scotland Trunk Roads (Temporary Prohibitions of Traffic and Overtaking and Temporary Speed Restrictions) (No. 4) Order 2016 (S.S.I. 2016 No. 172)
- The North West Scotland Trunk Roads (Temporary Prohibitions of Traffic and Overtaking and Temporary Speed Restrictions) (No. 4) Order 2016 (S.S.I. 2016 No. 173)
- The North East Scotland Trunk Roads (Temporary Prohibitions of Traffic and Overtaking and Temporary Speed Restrictions) (No. 4) Order 2016 (S.S.I. 2016 No. 174)
- he A75 Trunk Road (Castle Kennedy) (50 mph Speed Limit) Order 2016( S.S.I. 2016 No. 175)
- he A68 Trunk Road (Edinburgh Road, Jedburgh) (Temporary Prohibition on Waiting and 30 mph Speed Restriction) Order 2011( S.S.I. 2016 No. 176)
- The A830 Trunk Road (Lochailort) (50 mph Speed Limit) Order 2016 (S.S.I. 2016 No. 177)
- The Common Agricultural Policy (Direct Payments etc.) (Scotland) Amendment (No. 2) Regulations 2016 (S.S.I. 2016 No. 178)
- he M8 (Townhead) M80 (Provan) Trunk Roads (Temporary Prohibition on Use of Road) Order 2016( S.S.I. 2016 No. 179)
- The M9/A9 Trunk Road (Munlochy Junction) (Temporary Prohibition of Specified Turns) Order 2016 (S.S.I. 2016 No. 180)
- The A702 Trunk Road (Penicuik Rideout) (Temporary Prohibition On Use of Road) Order 2016 (S.S.I. 2016 No. 181)
- The South West Scotland Trunk Roads (Temporary Prohibitions of Traffic and Overtaking and Temporary Speed Restrictions) (No. 5) Order 2016 (S.S.I. 2016 No. 182)
- The South East Scotland Trunk Roads (Temporary Prohibitions of Traffic and Overtaking and Temporary Speed Restrictions) (No. 5) Order 2016 (S.S.I. 2016 No. 183)
- The North West Scotland Trunk Roads (Temporary Prohibitions of Traffic and Overtaking and Temporary Speed Restrictions) (No. 5) Order 2016 (S.S.I. 2016 No. 184)
- The North East Scotland Trunk Roads (Temporary Prohibitions of Traffic and Overtaking and Temporary Speed Restrictions) (No. 5) Order 2016 (S.S.I. 2016 No. 185)
- The A725 Trunk Road (Bellshill) (Temporary Prohibition of Traffic) Order 2016 (S.S.I. 2016 No. 186)
- The Sexual Offences Act 2003 (Prescribed Police Stations) (Scotland) Amendment Regulations 2016 (S.S.I. 2016 No. 187)
- The Air Weapons Licensing (Scotland) Regulations 2016 (S.S.I. 2016 No. 188)
- The A82 Trunk Road (North Ballachulish to Corran Ferry Cycle Track) (Redetermination of Means of Exercise of Public Right of Passage) Order 2016 (S.S.I. 2016 No. 189)
- The Foods for Specific Groups (Scotland) Regulations 2016 (S.S.I. 2016 No. 190)
- The Food Information (Scotland) Amendment Regulations 2016 (S.S.I. 2016 No. 191)
- The Education (Scotland) Act 2016 (Commencement No. 1) Regulations 2016 (S.S.I. 2016 No. 192 (C. 15))
- The Land Reform (Scotland) Act 2016 (Commencement No. 1 and Transitional Provision) Regulations 2016 (S.S.I. 2016 No. 193 (C. 16))
- Act of Sederunt (Sheriff Appeal Court Rules 2015 and Sheriff Court Rules Amendment) (Miscellaneous) 2016 (S.S.I. 2016 No. 194)
- The National Health Service (Free Prescriptions and Charges for Drugs and Appliances) (Scotland) Amendment Regulations 2016 (S.S.I. 2016 No. 195)
- The Inquiries into Fatal Accidents and Sudden Deaths etc. (Scotland) Act 2016 (Commencement No. 1 and Transitional Provision) Regulations 2016 (S.S.I. 2016 No. 196 (C. 17))
- he A83 Trunk Road (Poltalloch Street, Lochgilphead) (Temporary Prohibition On Use of Road) Order 2016( S.S.I. 2016 No. 197)
- The A68 Trunk Road (Edinburgh Road, Jedburgh) (Temporary Prohibition on Waiting and 30 mph Speed Limit) (No. 2) Order 2016 (S.S.I. 2016 No. 198)
- The Criminal Justice (Scotland) Act 2016 (Commencement No. 2) Order 2016 (S.S.I. 2016 No. 199 (C. 18))
- Act of Sederunt (Simple Procedure) 2016 (S.S.I. 2016 No. 200)

== 201-300 ==
- Act of Adjournal (Criminal Procedure Rules 1996 Amendment) (No. 3) (Instruction of Representation in the High Court) 2016 (S.S.I. 2016 No. 201)
- The A828 Trunk Road (Creagan to Portnacroish) (40 mph and 50 mph Speed Limit) Order 2016 (S.S.I. 2016 No. 202)
- The A985 Trunk Road (Kincardine Bridge) (Temporary Prohibition of Specified Turns) Order 2016 (S.S.I. 2016 No. 203)
- The A96 Trunk Road (Castle Stuart) (Temporary 30 mph Speed Restriction) Order 2016 (S.S.I. 2016 No. 204)
- The M9/A9 and A85 Trunk Roads (T in the Park Event) (Temporary Prohibition on use of Road, of Waiting and Specified Turns, and Temporary 50 mph Speed Restriction) Order 2016 (S.S.I. 2016 No. 205)
- The North East Scotland Trunk Roads (Temporary Prohibitions of Traffic and Overtaking and Temporary Speed Restrictions) (No. 6) Order 2016 (S.S.I. 2016 No. 206)
- The North West Scotland Trunk Roads (Temporary Prohibitions of Traffic and Overtaking and Temporary Speed Restrictions) (No. 6) Order 2016 (S.S.I. 2016 No. 207)
- The South East Scotland Trunk Roads (Temporary Prohibitions of Traffic and Overtaking and Temporary Speed Restrictions) (No. 6) Order 2016 (S.S.I. 2016 No. 208)
- The South West Scotland Trunk Roads (Temporary Prohibitions of Traffic and Overtaking and Temporary Speed Restrictions) (No. 6) Order 2016 (S.S.I. 2016 No. 209)
- The Succession (Scotland) Act 2016 (Commencement, Transitional and Saving Provisions) Regulations 2016 (S.S.I. 2016 No. 210 (C. 19))
- The M77/A77 and A78 Trunk Roads (Open Golf Championship, Troon) (Temporary 30 mph Speed Restriction) Order 2016 (S.S.I. 2016 No. 211)
- The A9 Trunk Road (Upper Cairnie) (Temporary Prohibition of Specified Turns) Order 2016 (S.S.I. 2016 No. 212)
- The A85 Trunk Road (Laggan Park to Bridge Street, Comrie) (Temporary Prohibition on Use of Road) Order 2016 (S.S.I. 2016 No. 213)
- The A876 and the A985 Trunk Road (Kincardine Bridge) (30 mph Speed Limit) Order 2016 (S.S.I. 2016 No. 214)
- Act of Sederunt (Sheriff Court Rules Amendment) (Personal Injury Pre-Action Protocol) 2016 (S.S.I. 2016 No. 215)
- The North East Scotland Trunk Roads (Temporary Prohibitions of Traffic and Overtaking and Temporary Speed Restrictions) (No. 7) Order 2016 (S.S.I. 2016 No. 216)
- The South East Scotland Trunk Roads (Temporary Prohibitions of Traffic and Overtaking and Temporary Speed Restrictions) (No. 7) Order 2016 (S.S.I. 2016 No. 217)
- The South West Scotland Trunk Roads (Temporary Prohibitions of Traffic and Overtaking and Temporary Speed Restrictions) (No. 7) Order 2016 (S.S.I. 2016 No. 218)
- The North West Scotland Trunk Roads (Temporary Prohibitions of Traffic and Overtaking and Temporary Speed Restrictions) (No. 7) Order 2016 (S.S.I. 2016 No. 219)
- The A828 Trunk Road (Duror to Kentallen) (40 mph and 50 mph Speed Limits) and Duror Primary School (Part-Time 20 mph Speed Limit) Order 2016 (S.S.I. 2016 No. 220)
- he A78 Trunk Road (Greenock) (Temporary Prohibition on Waiting, Loading and Unloading) Order 2016( S.S.I. 2016 No. 221)
- The A83 Trunk Road (Furnace to Cumlodden) (Temporary 40 mph Speed Limit) Order 2016 (S.S.I. 2016 No. 222)
- The A977 Trunk Road (Longannet Roundabout) (Temporary Prohibition on Waiting, Loading and Unloading) Order 2016 (S.S.I. 2016 No. 223)
- he M8 (Junction 29A at A8 Greenock Road) Special Road Scheme 2016( S.S.I. 2016 No. 224)
- The M8 (Junction 29A at A8 Greenock Road) Side Roads Order 2016 (S.S.I. 2016 No. 225)
- he A78 Trunk Road (Largs) (Temporary Prohibition on Waiting, Loading and Unloading) Order 2016( S.S.I. 2016 No. 226)
- The A82 Trunk Road (North Ballachulish to South of Fort William) (40 mph and 50 mph Speed Limits) Order 2016 (S.S.I. 2016 No. 227)
- The A85 Trunk Road (Perth Road to James Square, Crieff) (Temporary Prohibition on Use of Road) Order 2016 (S.S.I. 2016 No. 228)
- Act of Sederunt (Rules of the Court of Session 1994 and Sheriff Court Rules Amendment) (No. 2) (Miscellaneous) 2016 (S.S.I. 2016 No. 229)
- The M90/A90 Trunk Road (The Parkway) (Temporary Prohibition of Specified Turns and Temporary 30 mph Speed Restriction) Order 2016 (S.S.I. 2016 No. 230)
- The Scottish Tribunals (Time Limits) Regulations 2016 (S.S.I. 2016 No. 231)
- The Upper Tribunal for Scotland (Rules of Procedure) Regulations 2016 (S.S.I. 2016 No. 232)
- he Children and Young People (Scotland) Act 2014 (Commencement No. 11) Partial Revocation Order 2016( S.S.I. 2016 No. 233 (C. 20))
- The Named Persons (Training, Qualifications, Experience and Position) and the Child's Plan (Scotland) Revocation Order 2016( S.S.I. 2016 No. 234)
- The M77/A77 Trunk Road (Bankfield Roundabout) (Temporary 40 mph Speed Restriction) Order 2016 (S.S.I. 2016 No. 235)
- The South East Scotland Trunk Roads (Temporary Prohibitions of Traffic and Overtaking and Temporary Speed Restrictions) (No. 8) Order 2016 (S.S.I. 2016 No. 236)
- The South West Scotland Trunk Roads (Temporary Prohibitions of Traffic and Overtaking and Temporary Speed Restrictions) (No. 8) Order 2016 (S.S.I. 2016 No. 237)
- The North East Scotland Trunk Roads (Temporary Prohibitions of Traffic and Overtaking and Temporary Speed Restrictions) (No. 8) Order 2016 (S.S.I. 2016 No. 238)
- The North West Scotland Trunk Roads (Temporary Prohibitions of Traffic and Overtaking and Temporary Speed Restrictions) (No. 8) Order 2016 (S.S.I. 2016 No. 239)
- The A82 Trunk Road (Drumnadrochit to Fort Augustus) (Temporary Prohibition on Use of Road) Order 2016 (S.S.I. 2016 No. 240)
- Act of Sederunt (Registration Appeal Court) 2016 (S.S.I. 2016 No. 241)
- Act of Sederunt (Rules of the Court of Session 1994 and Sheriff Court Rules Amendment) (No. 3) (Miscellaneous) 2016 (S.S.I. 2016 No. 242)
- Act of Sederunt (Lay Representation for Non-Natural Persons) 2016 (S.S.I. 2016 No. 243)
- Act of Sederunt (Fitness Assessment Tribunal Rules) 2016 (S.S.I. 2016 No. 244)
- The Road Traffic (Permitted Parking Area and Special Parking Area) (Highland Council) Designation Order 2016 (S.S.I. 2016 No. 245)
- he Parking Attendants (Wearing of Uniforms) (Highland Council Parking Area) Regulations 2011( S.S.I. 2016 No. 246)
- The Road Traffic (Parking Adjudicators) (Highland Council) Regulations 2016 (S.S.I. 2016 No. 247)
- he A76 Trunk Road (High Street, Sanquhar) (Temporary Prohibition on Waiting, Loading and Unloading) Order 2016( S.S.I. 2016 No. 248)
- The Scottish Fire and Rescue Service (Framework) Order 2016 (S.S.I. 2016 No. 249)
- The Land Reform (Scotland) Act 2016 (Commencement No. 2 and Transitory Provisions) Regulations 2016 (S.S.I. 2016 No. 250 (C. 21))
- The Water Environment (Shellfish Water Protected Areas: Designation) (Scotland) Order 2016 (S.S.I. 2016 No. 251)
- The M8/A8 Trunk Road (Swinton) (Temporary Prohibition On Use of Road) Order 2016 (S.S.I. 2016 No. 252)
- The Council Tax Reduction (Scotland) Amendment (No. 2) Regulations 2016 (S.S.I. 2016 No. 253)
- The Children and Young People (Scotland) Act 2014 (Commencement No. 12 and Saving Provision) Order 2016 (S.S.I. 2016 No. 254 (C. 22))
- The Children's Services Planning (Specified Date) (Scotland) Order 2016 (S.S.I. 2016 No. 255)
- The Apologies (Scotland) Act 2016 (Commencement and Transitory Provision) Regulations 2016 (S.S.I. 2016 No. 256 (C. 23))
- The Civil Legal Aid (Scotland) (Miscellaneous Amendments) Regulations 2016 (S.S.I. 2016 No. 257)
- The Acquisition of Land (Rate of Interest after Entry) (Scotland) Amendment Regulations 2016 (S.S.I. 2016 No. 258)
- The Smoking Prohibition (Children in Motor Vehicles) (Scotland) Act 2016 (Commencement) Regulations 2016 (S.S.I. 2016 No. 259 (C. 24))
- The Food Hygiene (Scotland) Amendment Regulations 2016 (S.S.I. 2016 No. 260)
- The Education (Student Loans) (Scotland) Amendment Regulations 2016 (S.S.I. 2016 No. 261)
- The Community Justice (Scotland) Act 2016 (Commencement No. 1 and Transitional Provision) Regulations 2016 (S.S.I. 2016 No. 262 (C. 25))
- The Representation of the People (Variation of Limit of Candidates’ Local Government Election Expenses) (Scotland) Order 2016 (S.S.I. 2016 No. 263)
- The Representation of the People (Absent Voting at Local Government Elections) (Scotland) Amendment (No. 2) Regulations 2016 (S.S.I. 2016 No. 264)
- The Aberdeen City (Electoral Arrangements) Order 2016 (S.S.I. 2016 No. 265)
- The Aberdeenshire (Electoral Arrangements) Order 2016 (S.S.I. 2016 No. 266)
- The Angus (Electoral Arrangements) Order 2016 (S.S.I. 2016 No. 267)
- The Clackmannanshire (Electoral Arrangements) Order 2016 (S.S.I. 2016 No. 268)
- The Dumfries and Galloway (Electoral Arrangements) Order 2016 (S.S.I. 2016 No. 269)
- The City of Edinburgh (Electoral Arrangements) Order 2016 (S.S.I. 2016 No. 270)
- The East Ayrshire (Electoral Arrangements) Order 2016 (S.S.I. 2016 No. 271)
- The East Dunbartonshire (Electoral Arrangements) Order 2016 (S.S.I. 2016 No. 272)
- The East Lothian (Electoral Arrangements) Order 2016 (S.S.I. 2016 No. 273)
- The East Renfrewshire (Electoral Arrangements) Order 2016 (S.S.I. 2016 No. 274)
- The Falkirk (Electoral Arrangements) Order 2016 (S.S.I. 2016 No. 275)
- The Fife (Electoral Arrangements) Order 2016 (S.S.I. 2016 No. 276)
- The Glasgow City (Electoral Arrangements) Order 2016 (S.S.I. 2016 No. 277)
- The Highland (Electoral Arrangements) Order 2016 (S.S.I. 2016 No. 278)
- The Inverclyde (Electoral Arrangements) Order 2016 (S.S.I. 2016 No. 279)
- The Midlothian (Electoral Arrangements) Order 2016 (S.S.I. 2016 No. 280)
- The Moray (Electoral Arrangements) Order 2016 (S.S.I. 2016 No. 281)
- The North Ayrshire (Electoral Arrangements) Order 2016 (S.S.I. 2016 No. 282)
- The North Lanarkshire (Electoral Arrangements) Order 2016 (S.S.I. 2016 No. 283)
- The Perth and Kinross (Electoral Arrangements) Order 2016 (S.S.I. 2016 No. 284)
- The Renfrewshire (Electoral Arrangements) Order 2016 (S.S.I. 2016 No. 285)
- The South Ayrshire (Electoral Arrangements) Order 2016 (S.S.I. 2016 No. 286)
- he South Lanarkshire (Electoral Arrangements) Order 2016( S.S.I. 2016 No. 287)
- The Stirling (Electoral Arrangements) Order 2016 (S.S.I. 2016 No. 288)
- The West Dunbartonshire (Electoral Arrangements) Order 2016 (S.S.I. 2016 No. 289)
- The Civil Legal Aid (Scotland) (Fees) Amendment Regulations 2016 (S.S.I. 2016 No. 290)
- The Courts Reform (Scotland) Act 2014 (Commencement No. 7, Transitional and Saving Provisions) Order 2016 (S.S.I. 2016 No. 291 (C. 26))
- The Smoke Control Areas (Exempted Fireplaces) (Scotland) Revocation Order 2016 (S.S.I. 2016 No. 292)
- The Smoke Control Areas (Authorised Fuels) (Scotland) Revocation Regulations 2016 (S.S.I. 2016 No. 293)
- The Bankruptcy (Scotland) Act 2016 (Commencement) Regulations 2016 (S.S.I. 2016 No. 294 (C. 27))
- The Bankruptcy (Applications and Decisions) (Scotland) Regulations 2016 (S.S.I. 2016 No. 295)
- The A78 Trunk Road (Gallowgate Street, Largs) (Temporary Prohibition on Waiting, Loading and Unloading) Order 2016 (S.S.I. 2016 No. 296)
- The A84/A85 and A85 Trunk Roads (Lochearnhead and Lochearnside) (30 mph and 50 mph Speed Limits) Order 2016 (S.S.I. 2016 No. 297)
- The Private Housing (Tenancies) (Scotland) Act 2016 (Commencement No. 1) Regulations 2016 (S.S.I. 2016 No. 298 (C. 28))
- The Additional Support for Learning (Sources of Information) (Scotland) Order 2016 (S.S.I. 2016 No. 299)
- Act of Adjournal (Criminal Procedure Rules 1996 Amendment) (No. 3) (Supervision Default Orders) 2016 (S.S.I. 2016 No. 300)

=== 301-400 ===
- The A78 Trunk Road (Largs) (Temporary Prohibition of Specified Turns) Order 2016 (S.S.I. 2016 No. 301)
- The North West Scotland Trunk Roads (Temporary Prohibitions of Traffic and Overtaking and Temporary Speed Restrictions) (No. 9) Order 2016 (S.S.I. 2016 No. 302)
- The North East Scotland Trunk Roads (Temporary Prohibitions of Traffic and Overtaking and Temporary Speed Restrictions) (No. 9) Order 2016 (S.S.I. 2016 No. 303)
- The South East Scotland Trunk Roads (Temporary Prohibitions of Traffic and Overtaking and Temporary Speed Restrictions) (No. 9) Order 2016 (S.S.I. 2016 No. 304)
- The South West Scotland Trunk Roads (Temporary Prohibitions of Traffic and Overtaking and Temporary Speed Restrictions) (No. 9) Order 2016 (S.S.I. 2016 No. 305)
- Act of Sederunt (Electronic Authentication) 2016 (S.S.I. 2016 No. 306)
- The Air Weapons and Licensing (Scotland) Act 2015 (Commencement No. 5 and Saving Provisions) Order 2016 (S.S.I. 2016 No. 307 (C. 29))
- The M73 Trunk Road (Mollinsburn) (Temporary 50 mph Speed Restriction) Order 2016 (S.S.I. 2016 No. 308)
- The Community Justice Outcomes Improvement Plan and Performance Report (Scotland) Regulations 2016 (S.S.I. 2016 No. 309)
- The Prohibited Procedures on Protected Animals (Exemptions) (Scotland) Amendment Regulations 2016 (S.S.I. 2016 No. 310)
- The Public Appointments and Public Bodies etc. (Scotland) Act 2003 (Treatment of Crown Estate Scotland (Interim Management) as Specified Authority) Order 2016 (S.S.I. 2016 No. 311)
- Act of Sederunt (Rules of the Court of Session, Sheriff Appeal Court Rules and Sheriff Court Rules Amendment) (Bankruptcy (Scotland) Act 2016) 2016 (S.S.I. 2016 No. 312)
- Act of Sederunt (Sheriff Court Bankruptcy Rules) 2016 (S.S.I. 2016 No. 313)
- The Children and Young People (Scotland) Act 2014 (Part 4 and Part 5 Complaints) Revocation Order 2016 (S.S.I. 2016 No. 314)
- Act of Sederunt (Rules of the Court of Session 1994 and Sheriff Court Rules Amendment) (No. 4) (Simple Procedure) 2016 (S.S.I. 2016 No. 315)
- Act of Sederunt (Fees of Solicitors and Shorthand Writers in the Court of Session, Sheriff Appeal Court and Sheriff Court Amendment) 2016 (S.S.I. 2016 No. 316)
- The Civil Legal Aid (Scotland) (Fees) Amendment (No. 2) Regulations 2016 (S.S.I. 2016 No. 317)
- Act of Sederunt (Rules of the Court of Session 1994 Amendment) (Postal Administration) 2016 (S.S.I. 2016 No. 318)
- Act of Sederunt (Rules of the Court of Session 1994 and Summary Application Rules 1999 Amendment) (Serious Crime Prevention Orders etc.) 2016 (S.S.I. 2016 No. 319)
- The North West Scotland Trunk Roads (Temporary Prohibitions of Traffic and Overtaking and Temporary Speed Restrictions) (No. 10) Order 2016 (S.S.I. 2016 No. 320)
- Not Allocated (S.S.I. 2016 No. 321)
- The North East Scotland Trunk Roads (Temporary Prohibitions of Traffic and Overtaking and Temporary Speed Restrictions) (No. 10) Order 2016 (S.S.I. 2016 No. 322)
- The South West Scotland Trunk Roads (Temporary Prohibitions of Traffic and Overtaking and Temporary Speed Restrictions) (No. 10) Order 2016 (S.S.I. 2016 No. 323)
- The South East Scotland Trunk Roads (Temporary Prohibitions of Traffic and Overtaking and Temporary Speed Restrictions) (No. 10) Order 2016 (S.S.I. 2016 No. 324)
- The M9/A9 Trunk Road (East Haugh Junction) (Temporary Prohibition of Specified Turns) Order 2016 (S.S.I. 2016 No. 325)
- The Scottish Fiscal Commission Act 2016 (Commencement and Transitory Provision) Regulations 2016 (S.S.I. 2016 No. 326 (C. 30))
- The Water Resources (Scotland) Act 2013 (Commencement No. 4) Order 2016 (S.S.I. 2016 No. 327 (C. 31))
- The Climate Change (Annual Targets) (Scotland) Order 2016 (S.S.I. 2016 No. 328)
- The Justices of the Peace (Training and Appraisal) (Scotland) Order 2016 (S.S.I. 2016 No. 329)
- The Climate Change (Limit on Use of Carbon Units) (Scotland) Order 2016 (S.S.I. 2016 No. 330)
- The A83 Trunk Road (Poltalloch Street, Lochgilphead) (Temporary Prohibition On Use Of Road) (No. 2) Order 2016 (S.S.I. 2016 No. 331)
- The Court Fees (Miscellaneous Amendments) (Scotland) Order 2016 (S.S.I. 2016 No. 332)
- The Upper Tribunal for Scotland (Rules of Procedure) Amendment Regulations 2016 (S.S.I. 2016 No. 333)
- The Tenant Information Packs (Assured Tenancies) (Scotland) Amendment Order 2016 (S.S.I. 2016 No. 334)
- The First-tier Tribunal for Scotland (Transfer of Functions of the Homeowner Housing Committees) Regulations 2016 (S.S.I. 2016 No. 335)
- The First-tier Tribunal for Scotland (Transfer of Functions of the Homeowner Housing Panel) Regulations 2016 (S.S.I. 2016 No. 336)
- The First-tier Tribunal for Scotland (Transfer of Functions of the Private Rented Housing Committees) Regulations 2016 (S.S.I. 2016 No. 337)
- The First-tier Tribunal for Scotland (Transfer of Functions of the Private Rented Housing Panel) Regulations 2016 (S.S.I. 2016 No. 338)
- The First-tier Tribunal for Scotland Housing and Property Chamber (Procedure) Regulations 2016 (S.S.I. 2016 No. 339)
- he First-tier Tribunal for Scotland Housing and Property Chamber and Upper Tribunal for Scotland (Composition) Regulations 2016( S.S.I. 2016 No. 340)
- The First-tier Tribunal for Scotland (Chambers) Regulations 2016 (S.S.I. 2016 No. 341)
- The Scottish Tribunals (Offences in Relation to Proceedings) Regulations 2016 (S.S.I. 2016 No. 342)
- The A82 Trunk Road (Tomnahurich Street, Inverness) (Temporary Prohibition on Waiting, Loading and Unloading) Order 2016 (S.S.I. 2016 No. 343)
- The A84 Trunk Road (Doune) (Temporary Prohibition on Use of Road) Order 2016 (S.S.I. 2016 No. 344)
- The A85 Trunk Road (Crieff) (Temporary Prohibition on Use of Road) Order 2016 (S.S.I. 2016 No. 345)
- The Freedom of Information (Scotland) Act 2002 (Time for Compliance) Regulations 2016 (S.S.I. 2016 No. 346)
- The A83 Trunk Road (Arrochar) (Temporary Prohibition On Use of Road) Order 2016 (S.S.I. 2016 No. 347)
- The A96 Trunk Road (Church Road, Keith) (Temporary Prohibition On Use Of Road) Order 2016 (S.S.I. 2016 No. 348)
- The A68 Trunk Road (Cranstoun Church) (Temporary Prohibition On Use of Road) Order 2016 (S.S.I. 2016 No. 349)
- The A76 Trunk Road (Kirkconnel) (Temporary Prohibition on Waiting, Loading and Unloading) Order 2016 (S.S.I. 2016 No. 350)
- The A83 Trunk Road (Ardrishaig) (Temporary Prohibition On Use of Road) Order 2016 (S.S.I. 2016 No. 351)
- The A83 Trunk Road (Poltalloch Street and Lochnell Street, Lochgilphead) (Temporary Prohibition on Use of Road) Order 2016 (S.S.I. 2016 No. 352)
- The Representation of the People (Postal Voting for Local Government Elections) (Scotland) Amendment Regulations 2016 (S.S.I. 2016 No. 353)
- The Scottish Local Government Elections Amendment (No. 2) Order 2016 (S.S.I. 2016 No. 354)
- The A78 Trunk Road (Inverkip) (Temporary Prohibition on Use of Road) Order 2016 (S.S.I. 2016 No. 355)
- The Legal Aid (Scotland) Act 1986 Amendment Regulations 2016 (S.S.I. 2016 No. 356)
- The Asset Transfer Request (Procedure) (Scotland) Regulations 2016 (S.S.I. 2016 No. 357)
- The Asset Transfer Request (Review Procedure) (Scotland) Regulations 2016 (S.S.I. 2016 No. 358)
- The Asset Transfer Request (Appeals) (Scotland) Regulations 2016 (S.S.I. 2016 No. 359)
- The Asset Transfer Request (Appeal Where No Contract Concluded) (Scotland) Regulations 2016 (S.S.I. 2016 No. 360)
- The Asset Transfer Request (Designation of Community Transfer Bodies) (Scotland) Order 2016 (S.S.I. 2016 No. 361)
- The Community Empowerment (Registers of Land) (Scotland) Regulations 2016 (S.S.I. 2016 No. 362)
- The Community Empowerment (Scotland) Act 2015 (Commencement No. 4 and Transitory Provision) Order 2016 (S.S.I. 2016 No. 363 (C. 32))
- The Community Planning (Locality Planning) (Scotland) Regulations 2016 (S.S.I. 2016 No. 364)
- The Land Reform (Scotland) Act 2016 (Commencement No. 3, Transitory and Saving Provisions) Regulations 2016 (S.S.I. 2016 No. 365 (C. 33))
- The Land Reform (Scotland) Act 2016 (Consequential and Saving Provisions) Regulations 2016 (S.S.I. 2016 No. 366)
- Act of Sederunt (Sheriff Court Rules Amendment) (Miscellaneous) 2016 (S.S.I. 2016 No. 367)
- The Council Tax (Substitution of Proportion) (Scotland) Order 2016 (S.S.I. 2016 No. 368)
- The Council Tax (Variation for Unoccupied Dwellings) (Scotland) Amendment Regulations 2016 (S.S.I. 2016 No. 369)
- The Inquiries into Fatal Accidents and Sudden Deaths etc. (Scotland) Act 2016 (Commencement No. 2, Transitional and Transitory Provision) Regulations 2016 (S.S.I. 2016 No. 370 (C. 34))
- The Title Conditions (Scotland) Act 2003 (Conservation Bodies) Amendment Order 2016 (S.S.I. 2016 No. 371)
- The Land Reform (Scotland) Act 2016 (Commencement No. 4, Transitional and Saving Provisions) Regulations 2016 (S.S.I. 2016 No. 372 (C. 35))
- The Scottish Ministers Annual Plan Planning Period (Scotland) Regulations 2016 (S.S.I. 2016 No. 373)
- The M9/A9 Trunk Road (Evanton Junction) (Temporary Prohibition of Specified Turns) Order 2016 (S.S.I. 2016 No. 374)
- The Public Appointments and Public Bodies etc. (Scotland) Act 2003 (Treatment of Scottish Fiscal Commission as Specified Authority) Order 2016 (S.S.I. 2016 No. 375)
- The Air Quality Standards (Scotland) Amendment Regulations 2016 (S.S.I. 2016 No. 376)
- The Budget (Scotland) Act 2016 Amendment Regulations 2016 (S.S.I. 2016 No. 377)
- The North East Scotland Trunk Roads (Temporary Prohibitions of Traffic and Overtaking and Temporary Speed Restrictions) (No. 11) Order 2016 (S.S.I. 2016 No. 378)
- The North West Scotland Trunk Roads (Temporary Prohibitions of Traffic and Overtaking and Temporary Speed Restrictions) (No. 11) Order 2016 (S.S.I. 2016 No. 379)
- The South East Scotland Trunk Roads (Temporary Prohibitions of Traffic and Overtaking and Temporary Speed Restrictions) (No. 11) Order 2016 (S.S.I. 2016 No. 380)
- The South West Scotland Trunk Roads (Temporary Prohibitions of Traffic and Overtaking and Temporary Speed Restrictions) (No. 11) Order 2016 (S.S.I. 2016 No. 381)
- The Higher Education Governance (Scotland) Act 2016 (Commencement, Transitory, Transitional and Savings Provisions) Regulations 2016 (S.S.I. 2016 No. 382 (C. 36))
- The Caseins and Caseinates (Scotland) Regulations 2016 (S.S.I. 2016 No. 383)
- Act of Sederunt (Rules of the Court of Session 1994 and Sheriff Court Rules Amendment) (No. 5) (Miscellaneous) 2016 (S.S.I. 2016 No. 384)
- The Human Trafficking and Exploitation (Scotland) Act 2015 (Commencement No. 2 and Transitional Provisions) Regulations 2016 (S.S.I. 2016 No. 385 (C. 37))
- The Education (Scotland) Act 2016 (Commencement No. 2) Regulations 2016 (S.S.I. 2016 No. 386 (C. 38))
- The Courts Reform (Scotland) Act 2014 (Relevant Officer and Consequential Provisions) Order 2016 (S.S.I. 2016 No. 387)
- The Sheriff Court Simple Procedure (Limits on Award of Expenses) Order 2016 (S.S.I. 2016 No. 388)
- The Land Reform (Scotland) Act 2016 (Consequential and Saving Provisions) Amendment Regulations 2016 (S.S.I. 2016 No. 389)
- The Lyon Court and Office Fees (Variation) (Devolved Functions) Order 2016 (S.S.I. 2016 No. 390)
- The Tweed Regulation (Salmon Conservation) (No. 2) Order 2016 (S.S.I. 2016 No. 391)
- The Conservation of Salmon (Scotland) Amendment Regulations 2016 (S.S.I. 2016 No. 392)
- The National Health Service (Dietitian Supplementary Prescribers and Therapeutic Radiographer Independent Prescribers) (Miscellaneous Amendments) (Scotland) Regulations 2016 (S.S.I. 2016 No. 393)
- The Community Empowerment (Scotland) Act 2015 (Commencement No. 5) Order 2016 (S.S.I. 2016 No. 394 (C. 39))
- The Apologies (Scotland) Act 2016 (Commencement and Transitory Provision) Amendment Regulations 2016 (S.S.I. 2016 No. 395 (C. 40))
- The Gardenstown Harbour Revision Order 2016 (S.S.I. 2016 No. 396)
- The Bankruptcy (Scotland) Regulations 2016 (S.S.I. 2016 No. 397)
- The Protected Trust Deeds (Forms) (Scotland) Regulations 2016 (S.S.I. 2016 No. 398)
- The Protected Trust Deeds (Scotland) Amendment Regulations 2016 (S.S.I. 2016 No. 399)
- The A7 Trunk Road (Langholm) (Temporary Prohibition on Waiting, Loading and Unloading) Order 2016 (S.S.I. 2016 No. 400)

=== 401-441 ===
- The Patient Rights (Complaints Procedure and Consequential Provisions) (Scotland) Amendment Regulations 2016 (S.S.I. 2016 No. 401)
- The Valuation for Rating (Decapitalisation Rate) (Scotland) Regulations 2016 (S.S.I. 2016 No. 402)
- The Smoking Prohibition (Children in Motor Vehicles) (Scotland) Act 2016 (Fixed Penalty Notices) Regulations 2016 (S.S.I. 2016 No. 403)
- The A9 Trunk Road (Luncarty to Pass of Birnam) (Side Roads) Order 2016 (S.S.I. 2016 No. 404)
- The A9 Trunk Road (Luncarty to Pass of Birnam) (Trunking) Order 2016 (S.S.I. 2016 No. 405)
- The Financial Assistance for Environmental Purposes (Scotland) Order 2016 (S.S.I. 2016 No. 406)
- The Road Traffic (Permitted Parking Area and Special Parking Area) (East Lothian Council) Designation Order 2016 (S.S.I. 2016 No. 407)
- The Parking Attendants (Wearing of Uniforms) (East Lothian Council Parking Area) Regulations 2016 (S.S.I. 2016 No. 408)
- The Road Traffic (Parking Adjudicators) (East Lothian Council) Regulations 2016 (S.S.I. 2016 No. 409)
- The Community Empowerment (Scotland) Act 2015 (Commencement No. 6) Order 2016 (S.S.I. 2016 No. 410 (C. 41))
- The Community Empowerment (Miscellaneous Amendments) (Scotland) Regulations 2016 (S.S.I. 2016 No. 411)
- The Housing (Scotland) Act 2014 (Commencement No. 6 and Transitional Provision) Order 2016 (S.S.I. 2016 No. 412 (C. 42))
- The Regulation of Care (Prescribed Registers) (Scotland) Amendment Order 2016 (S.S.I. 2016 No. 413)
- The Aberdeen Harbour Revision Order 2016 (S.S.I. 2016 No. 414)
- Act of Sederunt (Sheriff Court Rules Amendment) (Electronic Authentication) 2016 (S.S.I. 2016 No. 415)
- The Home Detention Curfew Licence (Amendment) (Scotland) Order 2016 (S.S.I. 2016 No. 416)
- The Burial and Cremation (Scotland) Act 2016 (Commencement No. 1, Transitory and Transitional Provisions) Regulations 2016 (S.S.I. 2016 No. 417 (C. 43))
- The A92/A972 Trunk Road (South of Markinch Road, Cadham to North of Balfarg Junction) (40 mph Speed Limit) Order 2016 (S.S.I. 2016 No. 418)
- The Police Service of Scotland (Amendment) Regulations 2016 (S.S.I. 2016 No. 419)
- The A9 Trunk Road (McDiarmid Park) (Temporary 30 mph Speed Restriction) Order 2016 (S.S.I. 2016 No. 420)
- The Town and Country Planning (Miscellaneous Amendments and Transitional Saving Provision) (Scotland) Order 2016 (S.S.I. 2016 No. 421)
- The Caseins and Caseinates (Scotland) (No. 2) Regulations 2016 (S.S.I. 2016 No. 422)
- The Maximum Number of Judges (Scotland) Order 2016 (S.S.I. 2016 No. 423)
- The Crofting Commission (Elections) (Scotland) Amendment Regulations 2016 (S.S.I. 2016 No. 424)
- The Gaelic Medium Education (Assessment Requests) (Scotland) Regulations 2016 (S.S.I. 2016 No. 425)
- The Criminal Justice (Scotland) Act 2016 (Commencement No. 3 and Saving Provision) Order 2016 (S.S.I. 2016 No. 426 (C. 44))
- The Civil Partnership, Marriage Between Persons of Different Sexes and Same Sex Marriage (Prescribed Bodies) (Scotland) Amendment Regulations 2016 (S.S.I. 2016 No. 427)
- The Air Weapons Licensing (Exemptions) (Scotland) Regulations 2016 (S.S.I. 2016 No. 428)
- The A85 Trunk Road (Comrie) (Temporary Prohibition On Use of Road) Order 2016 (S.S.I. 2016 No. 429)
- The A702 Trunk Road (Biggar) (Temporary Prohibition On Use of Road) Order 2016 (S.S.I. 2016 No. 430)
- The Firemen's Pension Scheme (Amendment and Transitional Provisions) (Scotland) Order 2016 (S.S.I. 2016 No. 431)
- The Letting Agent Registration (Scotland) Regulations 2016 (S.S.I. 2016 No. 432)
- The Licensing of Relevant Permanent Sites (Scotland) Regulations 2016 (S.S.I. 2016 No. 433)
- The Seed (Miscellaneous Amendments) (Scotland) Regulations 2016 (S.S.I. 2016 No. 434)
- The Arbitration (Scotland) Act 2010 (Transitional Provisions) Order 2016 (S.S.I. 2016 No. 435)
- Not Allocated (S.S.I. 2016 No. 436)
- The North West Scotland Trunk Roads (Temporary Prohibitions of Traffic and Overtaking and Temporary Speed Restrictions) (No. 12) Order 2016 (S.S.I. 2016 No. 437)
- The South East Scotland Trunk Roads (Temporary Prohibitions of Traffic and Overtaking and Temporary Speed Restrictions) (No. 12) Order 2016 (S.S.I. 2016 No. 438)
- The North East Scotland Trunk Roads (Temporary Prohibitions of Traffic and Overtaking and Temporary Speed Restrictions) (No. 12) Order 2016 (S.S.I. 2016 No. 439)
- The South West Scotland Trunk Roads (Temporary Prohibitions of Traffic and Overtaking and Temporary Speed Restrictions) (No. 12) Order 2016 (S.S.I. 2016 No. 440)
- The A82 Trunk Road (Invergarry Swing Bridges) (Temporary Prohibition on Use and Width Restriction) Order 2016 (S.S.I. 2016 No. 441)
