= List of Scottish statutory instruments, 2014 =

This is a complete list of Scottish statutory instruments in 2014.

== 1-100 ==
- The Police Service of Scotland (Amendment) Regulations 2014 (S.S.I. 2014 No. 1)
- The Sea Fish (Prohibited Methods of Fishing) (Firth of Clyde) Order 2014 (S.S.I. 2014 No. 2)
- The Water and Sewerage Services to Dwellings (Collection of Unmetered Charges by Local Authority) (Scotland) Order 2014 (S.S.I. 2014 No. 3)
- The Environmental Protection (Duty of Care) (Scotland) Regulations 2014 (S.S.I. 2014 No. 4)
- The Sports Grounds and Sporting Events (Designation) (Scotland) Order 2014 (S.S.I. 2014 No. 5)
- The Common Agricultural Policy Schemes (Cross-Compliance) (Scotland) Amendment Regulations 2014 (revoked) (S.S.I. 2014 No. 6)
- The Less Favoured Area Support Scheme (Scotland) Amendment Regulations 2014 (S.S.I. 2014 No. 7)
- The Long Leases (Appeal Period) (Scotland) Order 2014 (S.S.I. 2014 No. 8)
- The Long Leases (Prescribed Form of Notices etc.) (Scotland) Regulations 2014 (S.S.I. 2014 No. 9)
- The A90 Trunk Road (Northbound Slip Road from B980 Castlandhill Road) (Temporary Prohibition on Use of Road and Temporary Speed Restrictions) Order 2014 (S.S.I. 2014 No. 10)
- The A9 Trunk Road (Blair Atholl Junction) (Temporary Prohibition on Use of Road) Order 2014 (S.S.I. 2014 No. 11)
- The Infant Formula and Follow-on Formula (Scotland) Amendment Regulations 2014 (S.S.I. 2014 No. 12)
- The Discontinuance of Aberdeen and Peterhead Prisons (Scotland) Order 2014 (S.S.I. 2014 No. 13)
- Act of Sederunt (Fees of Solicitors in the Sheriff Court) (Amendment) 2014 (S.S.I. 2014 No. 14)
- Act of Sederunt (Rules of the Court of Session Amendment) (Fees of Solicitors) 2014 (S.S.I. 2014 No. 15)
- The A9 Trunk Road (Kessock Bridge) (Temporary Prohibition of Specified Turns, Width Restriction and Use of Specified Lanes) Order 2014 (S.S.I. 2014 No. 16)
- The South East Scotland Trunk Roads (Temporary Prohibitions of Traffic and Overtaking and Temporary Speed Restrictions) (No. 1) Order 2014 (S.S.I. 2014 No. 17)
- The South West Scotland Trunk Roads (Temporary Prohibitions of Traffic and Overtaking and Temporary Speed Restrictions) (No. 1) Order 2014 (S.S.I. 2014 No. 18)
- The North East Scotland Trunk Roads (Temporary Prohibitions of Traffic and Overtaking and Temporary Speed Restrictions) (No. 1) Order 2014 (S.S.I. 2014 No. 19)
- The North West Scotland Trunk Roads (Temporary Prohibitions of Traffic and Overtaking and Temporary Speed Restrictions) (No. 1) Order 2014 (S.S.I. 2014 No. 20)
- The Post-16 Education (Scotland) Act 2013 (Commencement No. 3 and Transitory and Savings Provisions) Order 2014 (S.S.I. 2014 No. 21 (C. 1))
- The Designation of Regional Colleges (Scotland) Order 2014 (S.S.I. 2014 No. 22)
- The Local Government Pension Scheme (Miscellaneous Amendments) (Scotland) Regulations 2014 (S.S.I. 2014 No. 23)
- The Lands Tribunal for Scotland Amendment (Fees) Rules 2014 (S.S.I. 2014 No. 24)
- The Self-directed Support (Direct Payments) (Scotland) Regulations 2014 (S.S.I. 2014 No. 25)
- The Prisons and Young Offenders Institutions (Scotland) Amendment Rules 2014 (S.S.I. 2014 No. 26)
- The A85 Trunk Road (Stafford Street, Oban) (Detrunking) Order 2014 (S.S.I. 2014 No. 27)
- The Non-Domestic Rate (Scotland) Order 2014 (S.S.I. 2014 No. 28)
- Act of Sederunt (Messengers-at-Arms and Sheriff Officers Rules) (Amendment) 2014 (S.S.I. 2014 No. 29)
- The Non-Domestic Rates (Levying) (Scotland) Regulations 2014 (S.S.I. 2014 No. 30)
- The Non-Domestic Rating (Unoccupied Property) (Scotland) Amendment Regulations 2014 (S.S.I. 2014 No. 31)
- The Social Care (Self-directed Support) (Scotland) Act 2013 (Commencement, Transitional and Saving Provisions) Order 2014 (S.S.I. 2013 No. 32 (C. 2))
- The Protection of Vulnerable Groups (Scotland) Act 2007 (Miscellaneous Provisions) Amendment Order 2014 (S.S.I. 2014 No. 33)
- The Prisons (Interference with Wireless Telegraphy) Act 2012 (Commencement) (Scotland) Order 2014 (S.S.I. 2014 No. 34 (C. 3))
- The Council Tax Reduction (Scotland) Amendment Regulations 2014 (S.S.I. 2014 No. 35)
- The Local Government Finance (Scotland) Order 2014 (S.S.I. 2014 No. 36)
- The Council Tax (Discounts) (Scotland) Amendment Order 2014 (S.S.I. 2014 No. 37)
- The National Assistance (Assessment of Resources) Amendment (Scotland) Regulations 2014 (S.S.I. 2014 No. 38)
- The National Assistance (Sums for Personal Requirements) (Scotland) Regulations 2014 (S.S.I. 2014 No. 39)
- The Home Energy Assistance Scheme (Scotland) Amendment Regulations 2014 (S.S.I. 2014 No. 40)
- The Land Registration etc. (Scotland) Act 2012 (Commencement No. 2 and Transitional Provisions) Order 2014 (S.S.I. 2014 No. 41 (C. 4))
- The HIV Testing Kits and Services Revocation (Scotland) Regulations 2014 (S.S.I. 2014 No. 42)
- The National Health Service (Superannuation Scheme) (Scotland) Amendment Regulations 2014 (S.S.I. 2014 No. 43)
- The Teachers’ Superannuation (Scotland) Amendment Regulations 2014 (S.S.I. 2014 No. 44)
- The South West Scotland Trunk Roads (Temporary Prohibitions of Traffic and Overtaking and Temporary Speed Restrictions) (No. 2) Order 2014 (S.S.I. 2014 No. 45)
- The South East Scotland Trunk Roads (Temporary Prohibitions of Traffic and Overtaking and Temporary Speed Restrictions) (No. 2) Order 2014

(S.S.I. 2014 No. 46)

- The North West Scotland Trunk Roads (Temporary Prohibitions of Traffic and Overtaking and Temporary Speed Restrictions) (No. 2) Order 2014 (S.S.I. 2014 No. 47)
- The North East Scotland Trunk Roads (Temporary Prohibitions of Traffic and Overtaking and Temporary Speed Restrictions) (No. 2) Order 2014 (S.S.I. 2014 No. 48)
- The Proceeds of Crime Act 2002 (Disclosure of Information to and by Lord Advocate and Scottish Ministers) Amendment Order 2014 (S.S.I. 2014 No. 49)
- The Ethical Standards in Public Life etc. (Scotland) Act 2000 (Register of Interests) Amendment Regulations 2014 (S.S.I. 2014 No. 50)
- The Town and Country Planning (Hazardous Substances) (Scotland) Amendment Regulations 2014 (revoked) (S.S.I. 2014 No. 51)
- The Coatbridge College (Transfer and Closure) (Scotland) Order 2014 (S.S.I. 2014 No. 52)
- The Town and Country Planning (Tree Preservation Order and Trees in Conservation Areas) (Scotland) Amendment Regulations 2014 (S.S.I. 2014 No. 53)
- The High Hedges (Scotland) Act 2013 (Commencement) Order 2014 (S.S.I. 2014 No. 54 (C. 5))
- The High Hedges (Scotland) Act 2013 (Supplementary Provision) Order 2014 (S.S.I. 2014 No. 55)
- The Road Works (Inspection Fees) (Scotland) Amendment Regulations 2014 (S.S.I. 2014 No. 56)
- The Personal Injuries (NHS Charges) (Amounts) (Scotland) Amendment Regulations 2014 (S.S.I. 2014 No. 57)
- The Scottish Road Works Register (Prescribed Fees) Regulations 2014 (S.S.I. 2014 No. 58)
- The Firemen’s Pension Scheme (Amendment) (Scotland) Order 2014 (S.S.I. 2014 No. 59)
- The Firefighters’ Pension Scheme (Scotland) Amendment Order 2014 (S.S.I. 2014 No. 60)
- The National Health Service (Optical Charges and Payments) (Scotland) Amendment Regulations 2014 (S.S.I. 2014 No. 61)
- The Police Pensions (Contributions) Amendment (Scotland) Regulations 2014 (S.S.I. 2014 No. 62)
- The Brucellosis (Scotland) Amendment Order 2014 (S.S.I. 2014 No. 63)
- The Non-Domestic Rating (Valuation of Utilities) (Scotland) Amendment Order 2014 (S.S.I. 2014 No. 64)
- The Carers (Waiving of Charges for Support) (Scotland) Regulations 2014 (S.S.I. 2014 No. 65)
- The Community Care (Joint Working etc.) (Scotland) Amendment Regulations 2014 (S.S.I. 2014 No. 66)
- The Police Service of Scotland (Performance) Regulations 2014 (S.S.I. 2014 No. 67)
- The Police Service of Scotland (Conduct) Regulations 2014 (S.S.I. 2014 No. 68)
- The Teachers’ Superannuation (Scotland) (Miscellaneous Amendments) Regulations 2014 (S.S.I. 2014 No. 69)
- The National Health Service (Charges to Overseas Visitors) (Scotland) (Amendment) Regulations 2014 (S.S.I. 2014 No. 70)
- The Tuberculosis (Scotland) Amendment Order 2014 (S.S.I. 2014 No. 71)
- The Brucellosis (Scotland) Amendment (No. 2) Order 2014 (S.S.I. 2014 No. 72)
- The National Health Service (Physiotherapist, Podiatrist or Chiropodist Independent Prescribers) (Miscellaneous Amendments) (Scotland) Regulations 2014 (S.S.I. 2014 No. 73)
- The Local Government Finance (Scotland) Amendment Order 2014 (S.S.I. 2014 No. 74)
- The North East Scotland Trunk Roads (Temporary Prohibitions of Traffic and Overtaking and Temporary Speed Restrictions) (No. 3) Order 2014 (S.S.I. 2014 No. 75)
- The North West Scotland Trunk Roads (Temporary Prohibitions of Traffic and Overtaking and Temporary Speed Restrictions) (No. 3) Order 2014 (S.S.I. 2014 No. 76)
- The South East Scotland Trunk Roads (Temporary Prohibitions of Traffic and Overtaking and Temporary Speed Restrictions) (No. 3) Order 2014 (S.S.I. 2014 No. 77)
- The South West Scotland Trunk Roads (Temporary Prohibitions of Traffic and Overtaking and Temporary Speed Restrictions) (No. 3) Order 2014 (S.S.I. 2014 No. 78)
- The Post-16 Education (Scotland) Act 2013 (Commencement No. 4 and Transitory Provisions) Order 2014 (S.S.I. 2014 No. 79 (C. 6))
- The Assigned Colleges (Scotland) Order 2014 (S.S.I. 2014 No. 80)
- The Budget (Scotland) Act 2013 Amendment Order 2014 (S.S.I. 2014 No. 81)
- The M9/A9 Trunk Road (Aberuthven to Findo Gask) (Temporary Prohibition of Specified Turns) Order 2014 (S.S.I. 2014 No. 82)
- The Electronic Documents (Scotland) Regulations 2014 (S.S.I. 2014 No. 83)
- The Road Traffic (Permitted Parking Area and Special Parking Area) (Argyll and Bute Council) Designation Order 2014 (S.S.I. 2014 No. 84)
- The Parking Attendants (Wearing of Uniforms) (Argyll and Bute Council Parking Area) Regulations 2014 (S.S.I. 2014 No. 85)
- The Road Traffic (Parking Adjudicators) (Argyll and Bute Council) Regulations 2014 (S.S.I. 2014 No. 86)
- Not Allocated (S.S.I. 2014 No. 87)
- Not Allocated (S.S.I. 2014 No. 88)
- Not Allocated (S.S.I. 2014 No. 89)
- The Social Care (Self-directed Support) (Scotland) Act 2013 (Consequential and Saving Provisions) Order 2014 (S.S.I. 2014 No. 90)
- The Community Care (Personal Care and Nursing Care) (Scotland) Amendment Regulations 2014 (S.S.I. 2014 No. 91)
- The Glasgow Commonwealth Games Act 2008 (Duration of Urgent Traffic Regulation Measures) Order 2014 (S.S.I. 2014 No. 92)
- The Patient Rights (Treatment Time Guarantee) (Scotland) Amendment Regulations 2014 (S.S.I. 2014 No. 93)
- The Renewables Obligation (Scotland) Amendment Order 2014 (S.S.I. 2014 No. 94)
- The Right to Interpretation and Translation in Criminal Proceedings (Scotland) Regulations 2014 (S.S.I. 2014 No. 95)
- The A887 Trunk Road (Torgoyle) (50 mph Speed Limit) Order 2014 (S.S.I. 2014 No. 96)
- The A8 Trunk Road (Bogston to Newark, Port Glasgow) (40 mph Speed Limit) Order 2014 (S.S.I. 2014 No. 97)
- The Agricultural Holdings (Scotland) Act 2003 Remedial Order 2014 (S.S.I. 2014 No. 98)
- Act of Sederunt (Fitness for Judicial Office Tribunal Rules) 2014 (S.S.I. 2014 No. 99)
- The National Health Service (Functions of the Common Services Agency) (Scotland) Amendment Order 2014 (S.S.I. 2014 No. 100)

== 101-200 ==
- The Scottish Independence Referendum (Chief Counting Officer and Counting Officer Charges and Expenses) Order 2014 (S.S.I. 2014 No. 101)
- Act of Sederunt (Fitness for Judicial Office Tribunal Rules) (No. 2) 2014 (S.S.I. 2014 No. 102)
- The Additional Support for Learning (Sources of Information) (Scotland) Amendment Order 2014 (S.S.I. 2014 No. 103)
- The South East Scotland Trunk Roads (Temporary Prohibitions of Traffic and Overtaking and Temporary Speed Restrictions) (No. 4) Order 2014 (S.S.I. 2014 No. 104)
- The South West Scotland Trunk Roads (Temporary Prohibitions of Traffic and Overtaking and Temporary Speed Restrictions) (No. 4) Order 2014 (S.S.I. 2014 No. 105)
- The North East Scotland Trunk Roads (Temporary Prohibitions of Traffic and Overtaking and Temporary Speed Restrictions) (No. 4) Order 2014 (S.S.I. 2014 No. 106)
- The North West Scotland Trunk Roads (Temporary Prohibitions of Traffic and Overtaking and Temporary Speed Restrictions) (No. 4) Order 2014 (S.S.I. 2014 No. 107)
- The Firemen’s Pension Scheme (Amendment No. 2) (Scotland) Order 2014 (S.S.I. 2014 No. 108)
- The Firefighters’ Compensation Scheme (Scotland) Amendment Order 2014 (S.S.I. 2014 No. 109)
- The Firefighters’ Pension Scheme (Scotland) Amendment (No. 2) Order 2014 (S.S.I. 2014 No. 110)
- The Marketing of Vegetable Plant Material Amendment (Scotland) Regulations 2014 (S.S.I. 2014 No. 111)
- The Children’s Hearings (Scotland) Act 2011 (Modification of Subordinate Legislation) Order 2014 (S.S.I. 2014 No. 112)
- The Adoption and Children (Scotland) Act 2007 (Compulsory Supervision Order Reports in Applications for Permanence Orders) Regulations 2014 (S.S.I. 2014 No. 113)
- The Insolvency (Scotland) Amendment Rules 2014 (S.S.I. 2014 No. 114)
- The National Health Service (Free Prescriptions and Charges for Drugs and Appliances) (Scotland) Amendment Regulations 2014 (S.S.I. 2014 No. 115)
- The Young People’s Involvement in Education and Training (Provision of Information) (Scotland) Order 2014 (S.S.I. 2014 No. 116)
- The Victims and Witnesses (Scotland) Act 2014 (Commencement No. 1) Order 2014 (S.S.I. 2014 No. 117 (C. 7))
- The Food Hygiene (Scotland) Amendment Regulations 2014 (S.S.I. 2014 No. 118)
- Act of Sederunt (Rules of the Court of Session and Sheriff Court Company Insolvency Rules Amendment) (Miscellaneous) 2014 (S.S.I. 2014 No. 119)
- The A85 Trunk Road (Dunollie Road) (Temporary Prohibition on Use of Road) Order 2014 (S.S.I. 2014 No. 120)
- The Marriage and Civil Partnership (Scotland) Act 2014 (Commencement No. 1) Order 2014 (S.S.I. 2014 No. 121 (C. 8))
- The Plant Health (Forestry) (Phytophthora ramorum Management Zone) (Scotland) Order 2014 (S.S.I. 2014 No. 122)
- The Adults with Incapacity (Supervision of Welfare Guardians etc. by Local Authorities) (Scotland) Amendment Regulations 2014 (S.S.I. 2014 No. 123)
- The M77/A77 Trunk Road (Vicarton Street, Girvan) (Temporary Prohibitions of Traffic and Overtaking and Temporary Speed Restrictions) Order 2014 (S.S.I. 2014 No. 124)
- The A99 Trunk Road (Thrumster) (50 mph Speed Limit) Order 2014 (S.S.I. 2014 No. 125)
- The A7 Trunk Road (Broadhaugh) (50 mph Speed Limit) Order 2014 (S.S.I. 2014 No. 126)
- The Land Registration etc. (Scotland) Act 2012 (Designated Day) Order 2014 (S.S.I. 2014 No. 127)
- The A92/A972 Trunk Road (B969 Western Avenue to the C49 leading to Star) (Temporary Prohibition of Specified Turns) Order 2014 (S.S.I. 2014 No. 128)
- The Regulation of Care (Social Service Workers) (Scotland) Amendment Order 2014 (S.S.I. 2014 No. 129)
- The Title Conditions (Scotland) Act 2003 (Rural Housing Bodies) Amendment Order 2014 (S.S.I. 2014 No. 130)
- The Children and Young People (Scotland) Act 2014 (Commencement No. 1 and Transitory Provisions) Order 2014 (S.S.I. 2014 No. 131 (C. 9))
- The Children and Young People (Scotland) Act 2014 (Ancillary Provision) Order 2014 (S.S.I. 2014 No. 132)
- The South East Scotland Trunk Roads (Temporary Prohibitions of Traffic and Overtaking and Temporary Speed Restrictions) (No. 5) Order 2014 (S.S.I. 2014 No. 133)
- The North East Scotland Trunk Roads (Temporary Prohibitions of Traffic and Overtaking and Temporary Speed Restrictions) (No. 5) Order 2014 (S.S.I. 2014 No. 134)
- The South West Scotland Trunk Roads (Temporary Prohibitions of Traffic and Overtaking and Temporary Speed Restrictions) (No. 5) Order 2014 (S.S.I. 2014 No. 135)
- The North West Scotland Trunk Roads (Temporary Prohibitions of Traffic and Overtaking and Temporary Speed Restrictions) (No. 5) Order 2014 (S.S.I. 2014 No. 136)
- The Children’s Hearings (Scotland) Act 2011 (Supplementary Provision) Order 2014 (S.S.I. 2014 No. 137)
- The M9/A9 Trunk Road (Aberuthven to Findo Gask) (Temporary Prohibition of Specified Turns) (No 2) Order 2014 (S.S.I. 2014 No. 138)
- The Town and Country Planning (Control of Advertisements) (Scotland) Amendment Regulations 2014 (S.S.I. 2014 No. 139)
- The Plant Health (Scotland) Amendment Order 2014 (revoked) (S.S.I. 2014 No. 140)
- The Registration of Births, Still-births, Deaths and Marriages (Prescription of Forms) (Scotland) Amendment Regulations 2014 (S.S.I. 2014 No. 141)
- The Town and Country Planning (General Permitted Development) (Scotland) Amendment Order 2014 (S.S.I. 2014 No. 142)
- The St Mary’s Music School (Aided Places) (Scotland) Amendment Regulations 2014 (S.S.I. 2014 No. 143)
- The Post-16 Education (Scotland) Act 2013 (Commencement No. 5) Order 2014 (S.S.I. 2014 No. 144 (C. 10))
- The Disabled Persons (Badges for Motor Vehicles) (Scotland) Amendment Regulations 2014 (S.S.I. 2014 No. 145)
- The Assigned Colleges (University of the Highlands and Islands) Order 2014 (S.S.I. 2014 No. 146)
- The Sexual Offences Act 2003 (Prescribed Police Stations) (Scotland) Regulations 2014 (S.S.I. 2014 No. 147)
- The National Health Service (Pharmaceutical Services) (Scotland) (Miscellaneous Amendments) Regulations 2014 (S.S.I. 2014 No. 148)
- The Firefighters’ Pension Scheme (Scotland) Amendment (No. 3) Order 2014 (S.S.I. 2014 No. 149)
- The Land Register Rules etc. (Scotland) Regulations 2014 (S.S.I. 2014 No. 150)
- The Specified Diseases (Notification and Slaughter) (Amendment) and Compensation (Scotland) Order 2014 (S.S.I. 2014 No. 151)
- Act of Sederunt (Rules of the Court of Session, Ordinary Cause Rules and Summary Cause Rules Amendment) (Miscellaneous) 2014 (S.S.I. 2014 No. 152)
- The Valuation and Rating (Exempted Classes) (Scotland) Order 2014 (S.S.I. 2014 No. 153)
- The National Health Service Superannuation Scheme (Scotland) (Miscellaneous Amendments) Regulations 2014 (S.S.I. 2014 No. 154)
- The Judicial Pensions and Retirement Act 1993 (Part-time Sheriff, Stipendiary Magistrate and Justice of the Peace) Order 2014 (S.S.I. 2014 No. 155)
- The A90 Trunk Road (Temporary Northbound Slip Road to Ferrytoll Roundabout) (Temporary Prohibition of Overtaking and Temporary Speed Restrictions) Order 2014 (S.S.I. 2014 No. 156)
- The Adults with Incapacity (Supervision of Welfare Guardians etc. by Local Authorities) (Scotland) Amendment (No. 2) Regulations 2014 (S.S.I. 2014 No. 157)
- The Pennan Harbour Revision Order 2014 (S.S.I. 2014 No. 158)
- The Right to Information (Suspects and Accused Persons) (Scotland) Regulations 2014 (S.S.I. 2014 No. 159)
- The Regulatory Reform (Scotland) Act 2014 (Commencement No. 1 and Transitional Provision) Order 2014 (S.S.I. 2014 No. 160 (C. 11))
- The Single Use Carrier Bags Charge (Scotland) Regulations 2014 (S.S.I. 2014 No. 161)
- Act of Adjournal (Criminal Procedure Rules Amendment) (Regulatory Reform (Scotland) Act 2014) 2014 (S.S.I. 2014 No. 162)
- Not Allocated (S.S.I. 2014 No. 163)
- The Local Government Pension Scheme (Scotland) Regulations 2014 (S.S.I. 2014 No. 164)
- The Children and Young People (Scotland) Act 2014 (Commencement No. 2, Transitional and Transitory Provisions) Order 2014 (S.S.I. 2014 No. 165 (C. 12))
- The Harbour Authority Designation (Scotland) Order 2014 (S.S.I. 2014 No. 166)
- The Seed (Fees) (Scotland) Regulations 2014 (S.S.I. 2014 No. 167)
- The A68 Trunk Road (Edinburgh Road, Jedburgh) (Temporary Prohibition on Waiting and 30 mph Speed Limit) Order 2014 (S.S.I. 2014 No. 168)
- The Road Traffic (Permitted Parking Area and Special Parking Area) (Inverclyde Council) Designation Order 2014 (S.S.I. 2014 No. 169)
- The Parking Attendants (Wearing of Uniforms) (Inverclyde Council Parking Area) Regulations 2014 (S.S.I. 2014 No. 170)
- The Road Traffic (Parking Adjudicators) (Inverclyde Council) Regulations 2014 (S.S.I. 2014 No. 171)
- The Bankruptcy and Debt Advice (Scotland) Act 2014 (Commencement No. 1 and Saving) Order 2014 (S.S.I. 2014 No. 172 (C. 13))
- The Bankruptcy and Diligence etc. (Scotland) Act 2007 (Commencement No. 9 and Savings Amendment) Order 2014 (S.S.I. 2014 No. 173 (C. 14))
- The M9/A9 Trunk Road (Gleneagles Railway Station to Millhill Farm) (Prohibition of Specified Turns) Order 2014 (S.S.I. 2014 No. 174)
- The A83 Trunk Road (Poltalloch Street, Lochgilphead) (Temporary Prohibition On Use of Road) Order 2014 (S.S.I. 2014 No. 175)
- The Aquaculture and Fisheries (Scotland) Act 2013 (Specification of Commercially Damaging Species) Order 2014 (S.S.I. 2014 No. 176)
- The A82 Trunk Road (Pulpit Rock Improvement) (Temporary Prohibition of Traffic and Overtaking and Speed Restriction) Order 2014 (S.S.I. 2014 No. 177)
- The South West Scotland Trunk Roads (Temporary Prohibitions of Traffic and Overtaking and Temporary Speed Restrictions) (No. 6) Order 2014 (S.S.I. 2014 No. 178)
- The South East Scotland Trunk Roads (Temporary Prohibitions of Traffic and Overtaking and Temporary Speed Restrictions) (No. 6) Order 2014 (S.S.I. 2014 No. 179)
- The North West Scotland Trunk Roads (Temporary Prohibitions of Traffic and Overtaking and Temporary Speed Restrictions) (No. 6) Order 2014 (S.S.I. 2014 No. 180)
- The North East Scotland Trunk Roads (Temporary Prohibitions of Traffic and Overtaking and Temporary Speed Restrictions) (No. 6) Order 2014 (S.S.I. 2014 No. 181)
- The A82 Trunk Road (Drumnadrochit to Fort Augustus) (Temporary Prohibition of Traffic) Order 2014 (S.S.I. 2014 No. 182)
- The Tribunals (Scotland) Act 2014 (Commencement No. 1) Order 2014 (S.S.I. 2014 No. 183 (C. 15))
- The Town and Country Planning (General Permitted Development) (Scotland) Amendment (Amendment) Order 2014 (S.S.I. 2014 No. 184)
- The Protection of Seals (Designation of Haul-Out Sites) (Scotland) Order 2014 (S.S.I. 2014 No. 185)
- Not Allocated (S.S.I. 2014 No. 186)
- The Proceeds of Crime Act 2002 (Amendment of Schedule 4) (Scotland) Order 2014 (S.S.I. 2014 No. 187)
- The Registers of Scotland (Fees) Order 2014 (S.S.I. 2014 No. 188)
- The Registers of Scotland (Information and Access) Order 2014 (S.S.I. 2014 No. 189)
- The Land Registration etc. (Scotland) Act 2012 (Incidental, Consequential and Transitional) Order 2014 (S.S.I. 2014 No. 190)
- The Public Appointments and Public Bodies etc. (Scotland) Act 2003 (Treatment of Revenue Scotland as Specified Authority) Order 2014 (S.S.I. 2014 No. 191)
- The Registration of Social Workers and Social Service Workers in Care Services (Scotland) Amendment Regulations 2014 (S.S.I. 2014 No. 192)
- The National Confidential Forum (Prescribed Care and Health Services) (Scotland) Order 2014 (revoked) (S.S.I. 2014 No. 193)
- The Land Register of Scotland (Rate of Interest on Compensation) Regulations 2014 (S.S.I. 2014 No. 194)
- The M90/A90 Trunk Road (Gairneybridge to Milnathort) (Temporary 50 mph and 30 mph Speed Restrictions) Order 2014 (S.S.I. 2014 No. 195)
- The Provision of Early Learning and Childcare (Specified Children) (Scotland) Order 2014 (S.S.I. 2014 No. 196)
- The M8 and M74 Trunk Roads (Games Lanes) Order 2014 (S.S.I. 2014 No. 197)
- The A9 and A82 Trunk Roads (Kessock) (50 mph Speed Limit) Order 2014 (S.S.I. 2014 No. 198)
- The A68 Trunk Road (Bongate and Newcastle Road, Jedburgh) (Temporary Prohibition On Use of Road) Order 2014 (S.S.I. 2014 No. 199)
- The Local Authority Accounts (Scotland) Regulations 2014 (S.S.I. 2014 No. 200)

=== 201-300 ===
- Act of Sederunt (Rules of the Court of Session and Sheriff Court Rules Amendment) (Miscellaneous) 2014 (S.S.I. 2014 No. 201)
- The Public Bodies (Joint Working) (Scotland) Act 2014 (Commencement No. 1) Order 2014 (S.S.I. 2014 No. 202 (C. 16))
- The A7 Trunk Road (High Street and Townhead, Langholm) (Temporary Prohibition On Use of Road) Order 2014 (S.S.I. 2014 No. 203)
- The M898/A898 and A82 Trunk Roads (Erskine Bridge) (50 mph Speed Limit) Order 2014 (S.S.I. 2014 No. 204)
- The M73, M74 and A725 (Commonwealth Games Triathlon) (Temporary Speed Restriction) Order 2014 (S.S.I. 2014 No. 205)
- The South East Scotland Trunk Roads (Temporary Prohibitions of Traffic and Overtaking and Temporary Speed Restrictions) (No. 7) Order 2014 (S.S.I. 2014 No. 206)
- The South West Scotland Trunk Roads (Temporary Prohibitions of Traffic and Overtaking and Temporary Speed Restrictions) (No. 7) Order 2014 (S.S.I. 2014 No. 207)
- The North West Scotland Trunk Roads (Temporary Prohibitions of Traffic and Overtaking and Temporary Speed Restrictions) (No. 7) Order 2014 (S.S.I. 2014 No. 208)
- The North East Scotland Trunk Roads (Temporary Prohibitions of Traffic and Overtaking and Temporary Speed Restrictions) (No. 7) Order 2014 (S.S.I. 2014 No. 209)
- The Victims and Witnesses (Scotland) Act 2014 (Commencement No. 2 and Transitional Provision) Order 2014 (S.S.I. 2014 No. 210 (C. 17))
- The M8/A8 Trunk Road (Commonwealth Games Time Trial Event) (Temporary Prohibition On Use and Temporary Speed Restriction) Order 2014 (S.S.I. 2014 No. 211)
- The Marriage and Civil Partnership (Scotland) Act 2014 (Commencement No. 2 and Saving Provisions) Order 2014 (S.S.I. 2014 No. 212 (C. 18))
- The Food Hygiene and Official Feed and Food Controls (Scotland) Amendment Regulations 2014 (S.S.I. 2014 No. 213)
- The Town and Country Planning (Fees for Applications and Deemed Applications) (Scotland) Amendment Regulations 2014 (S.S.I. 2014 No. 214)
- The A83 (Kennacraig to Campbeltown) (Trunking) Order 2014 (S.S.I. 2014 No. 215)
- The A82 Trunk Road (Crianlarich Bypass) (Temporary Speed Restriction) Order 2014 (S.S.I. 2014 No. 216)
- The Teachers’ Pension Scheme (Scotland) Regulations 2014 (S.S.I. 2014 No. 217)
- The Marriage and Civil Partnership (Scotland) Act 2014 (Commencement No. 2 and Saving Provisions) Amendment Order 2014 (S.S.I. 2014 No. 218 (C. 19))
- The Building (Scotland) Amendment Regulations 2014 (S.S.I. 2014 No. 219)
- The Title Conditions (Scotland) Act 2003 (Rural Housing Bodies) Amendment (No. 2) Order 2014 (S.S.I. 2014 No. 220)
- The Anti-social Behaviour, Crime and Policing Act 2014 (Commencement) (Scotland) Order 2014 (S.S.I. 2014 No. 221 (C. 20))
- The A96 Trunk Road (Forres Bypass) (40 mph Speed Limit) Order 2014 (S.S.I. 2014 No. 222)
- The A9 Trunk Road (Munlochy Junction) (Temporary Prohibition of Specified Turns) Order 2014 (S.S.I. 2014 No. 223)
- The Port of Ardersier Harbour Revision Order 2014 (S.S.I. 2014 No. 224)
- The Bankruptcy (Scotland) Regulations 2014 (S.S.I. 2014 No. 225)
- The Bankruptcy (Applications and Decisions) (Scotland) Regulations 2014 (S.S.I. 2014 No. 226)
- The Bankruptcy Fees (Scotland) Regulations 2014 (S.S.I. 2014 No. 227)
- The M90/A90 and A823(M) Trunk Roads (Inverkeithing to Masterton) (Temporary Prohibitions of Traffic and Pedestrians, Overtaking and Speed Restrictions) Order 2014 (S.S.I. 2014 No. 228)
- The Rules of the Scottish Land Court Order 2014 (S.S.I. 2014 No. 229)
- The Public Appointments and Public Bodies etc. (Scotland) Act 2003 (Treatment of the Convener of the School Closure Review Panels as Specified Authority) Order 2014 (S.S.I. 2014 No. 230)
- The Public Bodies (Joint Working) (Scotland) Act 2014 (Commencement No. 2) Order 2014 (S.S.I. 2014 No. 231 (C. 21))
- The Scottish Legal Complaints Commission (Modification of Duties and Powers) Regulations 2014 (S.S.I. 2014 No. 232)
- The Local Government Pension Scheme (Transitional Provisions and Savings) (Scotland) Regulations 2014 (S.S.I. 2014 No. 233)
- The North East Scotland Trunk Roads (Temporary Prohibitions of Traffic and Overtaking and Temporary Speed Restrictions) (No. 8) Order 2014 (S.S.I. 2014 No. 234)
- The North West Scotland Trunk Roads (Temporary Prohibitions of Traffic and Overtaking and Temporary Speed Restrictions) (No. 8) Order 2014 (S.S.I. 2014 No. 235)
- The South West Scotland Trunk Roads (Temporary Prohibitions of Traffic and Overtaking and Temporary Speed Restrictions) (No. 8) Order 2014 (S.S.I. 2014 No. 236)
- The South East Scotland Trunk Roads (Temporary Prohibitions of Traffic and Overtaking and Temporary Speed Restrictions) (No. 8) Order 2014 (S.S.I. 2014 No. 237)
- The M8 Special Road (Hillington Footbridge) Order 2014 (S.S.I. 2014 No. 238)
- The Public Appointments and Public Bodies etc. (Scotland) Act 2003 (Treatment of Historic Environment Scotland as Specified Authority) Order 2014 (S.S.I. 2014 No. 239)
- The M9/A9 and M90/A90 Trunk Roads (Ryder Cup) (Temporary Prohibition of Waiting and Specified Turns and Temporary 50 mph and 30 mph Speed Restrictions) Order 2014 (S.S.I. 2014 No. 240)
- The M90/A90 Trunk Roads (Ferrytoll Junction to Admiralty) (Temporary 50 mph Speed Restriction) Order 2014 (S.S.I. 2014 No. 241)
- Act of Adjournal (Amendment of the Criminal Procedure (Scotland) Act 1995 and Criminal Procedure Rules 1996) (Miscellaneous) 2014 (S.S.I. 2014 No. 242)
- The Homeless Persons (Unsuitable Accommodation) (Scotland) Order 2014 (S.S.I. 2014 No. 243)
- The A84 Trunk Road (Callander) (Temporary Prohibition of Pedestrians and Waiting, Loading and Unloading) Order 2014 (S.S.I. 2014 No. 244)
- The M90/A90 Trunk Road (Admiralty to Masterton) (Temporary Prohibitions of Traffic and Overtaking, and Speed Restrictions) Order 2014 (S.S.I. 2014 No. 245)
- The A9 Trunk Road (Kincraig to Dalraddy) (Side Roads) Order 2014 (S.S.I. 2014 No. 246)
- The A75 Trunk Road (Crocketford) (Restricted Road) Order 2014 (S.S.I. 2014 No. 247)
- The A82 Trunk Road (Crianlarich Bypass) (Temporary Prohibition of Use) Order 2014 (S.S.I. 2014 No. 248)
- The Town and Country Planning (Control of Advertisements) (Scotland) Amendment (No. 2) Regulations 2014 (S.S.I. 2014 No. 249)
- The Lanarkshire Colleges Order 2014 (S.S.I. 2014 No. 250)
- The Children and Young People (Scotland) Act 2014 (Commencement No. 3) Order 2014 (S.S.I. 2014 No. 251 (C. 22))
- Not Allocated (S.S.I. 2014 No. 252)
- The South East Scotland Trunk Roads (Temporary Prohibitions of Traffic and Overtaking and Temporary Speed Restrictions) (No. 9) Order 2014 (S.S.I. 2014 No. 253)
- The South West Scotland Trunk Roads (Temporary Prohibitions of Traffic and Overtaking and Temporary Speed Restrictions) (No. 9) Order 2014 (S.S.I. 2014 No. 254)
- The North West Scotland Trunk Roads (Temporary Prohibitions of Traffic and Overtaking and Temporary Speed Restrictions) (No. 9) Order 2014 (S.S.I. 2014 No. 255)
- The North East Scotland Trunk Roads (Temporary Prohibitions of Traffic and Overtaking and Temporary Speed Restrictions) (No. 9) Order 2014 (S.S.I. 2014 No. 256)
- The Legal Aid and Assistance By Way of Representation (Fees for Time at Court and Travelling) (Scotland) Regulations 2014 (S.S.I. 2014 No. 257)
- The Sulphur Content of Liquid Fuels (Scotland) Regulations 2014 (S.S.I. 2014 No. 258)
- The M74 Trunk Road (Raith) (Temporary Prohibition of Use) Order 2014 (S.S.I. 2014 No. 259)
- The South Arran Marine Conservation Order 2014 (S.S.I. 2014 No. 260)
- The Bankruptcy and Debt Advice (Scotland) Act 2014 (Commencement No. 2, Savings and Transitionals) Order 2014 (S.S.I. 2014 No. 261 (C. 23))
- The Convener of the School Closure Review Panels (Scotland) Regulations 2014 (S.S.I. 2014 No. 262)
- The Members of a School Closure Review Panel (Scotland) Regulations 2014 (S.S.I. 2014 No. 263)
- The Housing (Scotland) Act 2014 (Commencement No. 1, Transitional and Saving Provisions) Order 2014 (S.S.I. 2014 No. 264 (C. 24))
- Act of Sederunt (Commissary Business) (Amendment) 2014 (S.S.I. 2014 No. 265)
- The A8 Trunk Road (Chapelhall) (Temporary Prohibition on Use of Road) Order 2014 (S.S.I. 2014 No. 266)
- The Pollution Prevention and Control (Scotland) Amendment Regulations 2014 (S.S.I. 2014 No. 267)
- The Royal Conservatoire of Scotland Order of Council 2014 (S.S.I. 2014 No. 268)
- The A78 Trunk Road (Gallowgate Street, Largs) (Prohibition of Waiting, Loading and Unloading) Order 2014 (S.S.I. 2014 No. 269)
- The South East Scotland Trunk Roads (Temporary Prohibitions of Traffic and Overtaking and Temporary Speed Restrictions) (No. 10) Order 2014 (S.S.I. 2014 No. 270)
- The South West Scotland Trunk Roads (Temporary Prohibitions of Traffic and Overtaking and Temporary Speed Restrictions) (No. 10) Order 2014 (S.S.I. 2014 No. 271)
- The Legal Profession and Legal Aid (Scotland) Act 2007 (Membership of the Scottish Legal Complaints Commission) Amendment Order 2014 (S.S.I. 2014 No. 272)
- The North West Scotland Trunk Roads (Temporary Prohibitions of Traffic and Overtaking and Temporary Speed Restrictions) (No. 10) Order 2014 (S.S.I. 2014 No. 273)
- The HGV Speed Limit (M9/A9 Trunk Road) Regulations 2014 (S.S.I. 2014 No. 274)
- The North East Scotland Trunk Roads (Temporary Prohibitions of Traffic and Overtaking and Temporary Speed Restrictions) (No. 10) Order 2014 (S.S.I. 2014 No. 275)
- The A82 Trunk Road (Crianlarich Bypass) (Temporary Prohibition of Use and Speed Restriction) Order 2014 (S.S.I. 2014 No. 276)
- The Landfill Tax (Scotland) Act 2014 (Commencement No. 1) Order 2014 (S.S.I. 2014 No. 277 (C. 25))
- The Revenue Scotland and Tax Powers Act 2014 (Commencement No. 1) Order 2014 (S.S.I. 2014 No. 278 (C. 26))
- The Land and Buildings Transaction Tax (Scotland) Act 2013 (Commencement No. 1) Order 2014 (S.S.I. 2014 No. 279 (C. 27))
- The A96 Trunk Road (Church Road, Keith) (Temporary Prohibition on Use of Road) Order 2014 (S.S.I. 2014 No. 280)
- The Public Bodies (Joint Working) (Integration Joint Monitoring Committees) (Scotland) Order 2014 (S.S.I. 2014 No. 281)
- The Public Bodies (Joint Working) (Local Authority Officers) (Scotland) Regulations 2014 (S.S.I. 2014 No. 282)
- The Public Bodies (Joint Working) (Prescribed Consultees) (Scotland) Regulations 2014 (S.S.I. 2014 No. 283)
- The Public Bodies (Joint Working) (Prescribed Days) (Scotland) Regulations 2014 (S.S.I. 2014 No. 284)
- The Public Bodies (Joint Working) (Integration Joint Boards) (Scotland) Order 2014 (S.S.I. 2014 No. 285)
- The A82 Trunk Road (Pulpit Rock Improvement) (Temporary Prohibition of Traffic and Overtaking and Speed Restriction) (No. 2) Order 2014 (S.S.I. 2014 No. 286)
- The Marriage and Civil Partnership (Scotland) Act 2014 (Commencement No. 3, Saving, Transitional Provision and Revocation) Order 2014 (S.S.I. 2014 No. 287 (C. 28))
- The A83 Trunk Road (Lochgilphead) (Temporary Prohibition On Use of Road) Order 2014 (S.S.I. 2014 No. 288)
- The Products Containing Meat etc. (Scotland) Regulations 2014 (S.S.I. 2014 No. 289)
- The Common Financial Tool etc. (Scotland) Regulations 2014 (S.S.I. 2014 No. 290)
- Act of Sederunt (Rules of the Court of Session and Sheriff Court Rules Amendment No. 2) (Miscellaneous) 2014 (S.S.I. 2014 No. 291)
- The Teachers’ Pension Scheme (Scotland) (No. 2) Regulations 2014 (S.S.I. 2014 No. 292)
- The Bankruptcy and Debt Advice (Scotland) Act 2014 (Consequential Provisions) Order 2014 (S.S.I. 2014 No. 293)
- The Debt Arrangement Scheme (Scotland) Amendment Regulations 2014 (S.S.I. 2014 No. 294)
- The Charities Accounts (Scotland) Amendment Regulations 2014 (S.S.I. 2014 No. 295)
- The Bankruptcy (Money Advice and Deduction from Income etc.) (Scotland) Regulations 2014 (S.S.I. 2014 No. 296)
- The South Arran Marine Conservation (Amendment) Order 2014 (S.S.I. 2014 No. 297)
- The Discretionary Housing Payments (Limit on Total Expenditure) Revocation (Scotland) Order 2014 (S.S.I. 2014 No. 298)
- The A92/A972 Trunk Road (B969 Western Avenue to the C49 leading to Star) (Temporary Prohibition of Specified Turns) (No. 2) Order 2014 (S.S.I. 2014 No. 299)
- The Town and Country Planning (General Permitted Development) (Scotland) Amendment (No. 2) Order 2014 (S.S.I. 2014 No. 300)

=== 301-400 ===
- The Town and Country Planning (Fees for Applications and Deemed Applications) (Scotland) Amendment (No. 2) Regulations 2014 (S.S.I. 2014 No. 301)
- Act of Sederunt (Rules of the Court of Session and Sheriff Court Rules Amendment No. 2) (Marriage and Civil Partnership (Scotland) Act 2014) 2014 (S.S.I. 2014 No. 302)
- The Civil Partnership (Prescribed Bodies) (Scotland) Regulations 2014 (S.S.I. 2014 No. 303)
- The Marriage Between Persons of Different Sexes (Prescribed Bodies) (Scotland) Regulations 2014 (S.S.I. 2014 No. 304)
- The Same Sex Marriage (Prescribed Bodies) (Scotland) Regulations 2014 (S.S.I. 2014 No. 305)
- The Marriage and Civil Partnership (Prescribed Forms) (Scotland) Regulations 2014 (S.S.I. 2014 No. 306)
- The Public Bodies (Joint Working) (Health Professionals and Social Care Professionals) (Scotland) Regulations 2014 (S.S.I. 2014 No. 307)
- The Public Bodies (Joint Working) (Membership of Strategic Planning Group) (Scotland) Regulations 2014 (S.S.I. 2014 No. 308)
- The A82 Trunk Road (Glen Gloy Realignment) (Trunking and Detrunking) Order 2014 (S.S.I. 2014 No. 309)
- The Looked After Children (Scotland) Amendment Regulations 2014 (S.S.I. 2014 No. 310)
- The A82 Trunk Road (Glen Gloy Realignment) (Side Roads) Order 2014 (S.S.I. 2014 No. 311)
- The Food Information (Scotland) Regulations 2014 (S.S.I. 2014 No. 312)
- The Notice of Potential Liability for Costs (Discharge Notice) (Scotland) Order 2014 (S.S.I. 2014 No. 313)
- The Children and Young People (Scotland) Act 2014 (Commencement No. 4) Order 2014 (S.S.I. 2014 No. 314 (C. 29))
- The Children and Young People (Scotland) Act 2014 (Ancillary Provision) (No. 2) Order 2014 (S.S.I. 2014 No. 315)
- The Smoke Control Areas (Exempted Fireplaces) (Scotland) Order 2014 (S.S.I. 2014 No. 316)
- The Smoke Control Areas (Authorised Fuels) (Scotland) Regulations 2014 (S.S.I. 2014 No. 317)
- The Education (Disapplication of section 53B) (Scotland) Regulations 2014 (S.S.I. 2014 No. 318)
- The Environmental Regulation (Relevant Offences) (Scotland) Order 2014 (S.S.I. 2014 No. 319)
- The Controlled Waste (Fixed Penalty Notices) (Scotland) Order 2014 (S.S.I. 2014 No. 320)
- The Litter (Fixed Penalty Notices) (Scotland) Order 2014 (S.S.I. 2014 No. 321)
- The Mutual Recognition of Criminal Financial Penalties in the European Union (Scotland) (No. 1) Order 2014 (revoked) (S.S.I. 2014 No. 322)
- The Environmental Regulation (Liability where Activity Carried Out by Arrangement with Another) (Scotland) Order 2014 (S.S.I. 2014 No. 323)
- The Environmental Regulation (Significant Environmental Harm) (Scotland) Order 2014 (S.S.I. 2014 No. 324)
- The Common Agricultural Policy (Cross-Compliance) (Scotland) Regulations 2014 (S.S.I. 2014 No. 325)
- The Public Bodies (Joint Working) (Content of Performance Reports) (Scotland) Regulations 2014 (S.S.I. 2014 No. 326)
- The Conservation of Salmon (Annual Close Time and Catch and Release) (Scotland) Regulations 2014 (S.S.I. 2014 No. 327)
- The Road Traffic Act 1988 (Prescribed Limit) (Scotland) Regulations 2014 (S.S.I. 2014 No. 328)
- The South East Scotland Trunk Roads (Temporary Prohibitions of Traffic and Overtaking and Temporary Speed Restrictions) (No. 11) Order 2014 (S.S.I. 2014 No. 329)
- The North West Scotland Trunk Roads (Temporary Prohibitions of Traffic and Overtaking and Temporary Speed Restrictions) (No. 11) Order 2014 (S.S.I. 2014 No. 330)
- The North East Scotland Trunk Roads (Temporary Prohibitions of Traffic and Overtaking and Temporary Speed Restrictions) (No. 11) Order 2014 (S.S.I. 2014 No. 331)
- The South West Scotland Trunk Roads (Temporary Prohibitions of Traffic and Overtaking and Temporary Speed Restrictions) (No. 11) Order 2014 (S.S.I. 2014 No. 332)
- The Civil Jurisdiction and Judgments (Protection Measures) (Scotland) Regulations 2014 (S.S.I. 2014 No. 333)
- Not Allocated (S.S.I. 2014 No. 334)
- The Charities Accounts (Scotland) Amendment (No. 2) Regulations 2014 (S.S.I. 2014 No. 335)
- The Mutual Recognition of Criminal Financial Penalties in the European Union (Scotland) (No. 2) Order 2014 (revoked) (S.S.I. 2014 No. 336)
- The Mutual Recognition of Supervision Measures in the European Union (Scotland) Regulations 2014 (revoked) (S.S.I. 2014 No. 337)
- The Plant Health (Import Inspection Fees) (Scotland) Regulations 2014 (S.S.I. 2014 No. 338)
- The Regulation of Investigatory Powers (Authorisation of Covert Human Intelligence Sources) (Scotland) Order 2014 (S.S.I. 2014 No. 339)
- The M9/A9 Trunk Road (Munlochy Junction) (Temporary Prohibition of Specified Turns) Order 2014 (S.S.I. 2014 No. 340)
- The Public Bodies (Joint Working) (Integration Scheme) (Scotland) Regulations 2014 (S.S.I. 2014 No. 341)
- The Public Bodies (Joint Working) (Scotland) Act 2014 (Modifications) Order 2014 (S.S.I. 2014 No. 342)
- The Public Bodies (Joint Working) (National Health and Wellbeing Outcomes) (Scotland) Regulations 2014 (S.S.I. 2014 No. 343)
- The Public Bodies (Joint Working) (Prescribed Health Board Functions) (Scotland) Regulations 2014 (S.S.I. 2014 No. 344)
- The Public Bodies (Joint Working) (Prescribed Local Authority Functions etc.) (Scotland) Regulations 2014 (S.S.I. 2014 No. 345)
- The Land Registration etc. (Scotland) Act 2012 (Amendment and Transitional) Order 2014 (S.S.I. 2014 No. 346)
- The Land Register of Scotland (Automated Registration) etc. Regulations 2014 (S.S.I. 2014 No. 347)
- The Reservoirs (Scotland) Act 2011 (Commencement No. 1) Order 2014 (S.S.I. 2014 No. 348 (C. 30))
- Act of Adjournal (Criminal Procedure Rules Amendment No. 2) (Miscellaneous) 2014 (S.S.I. 2014 No. 349)
- The Land and Buildings Transaction Tax (Prescribed Proportions) (Scotland) Order 2014 (S.S.I. 2014 No. 350)
- The Land and Buildings Transaction Tax (Qualifying Public or Educational Bodies) (Scotland) Amendment Order 2014 (S.S.I. 2014 No. 351)
- The Land and Buildings Transaction Tax (Definition of Charity) (Relevant Territories) (Scotland) Regulations 2014 (S.S.I. 2014 No. 352)
- The Children and Young People (Scotland) Act 2014 (Commencement No. 5 and Saving Provision) Order 2014 (S.S.I. 2014 No. 353 (C. 31))
- The Freedom of Information (Scotland) Act 2002 (Scottish Public Authorities) Amendment Order 2014 (S.S.I. 2014 No. 354)
- The Scottish Tax Tribunals (Eligibility for Appointment) Regulations 2014 (S.S.I. 2014 No. 355)
- The Glasgow Commonwealth Games Act 2008 (Repeal Day) Order 2014 (S.S.I. 2014 No. 356)
- The Conservation of Salmon (Annual Close Time and Catch and Release) (Scotland) Amendment Regulations 2014 (S.S.I. 2014 No. 357)
- Not Allocated (S.S.I. 2014 No. 358)
- The Victims and Witnesses (Scotland) Act 2014 (Commencement No. 3 and Transitional Provision) Order 2014 (S.S.I. 2014 No. 359 (C. 32))
- The Victims and Witnesses (Scotland) Act 2014 (Prescribed Relatives) Order 2014 (S.S.I. 2014 No. 360)
- The Marriage Between Civil Partners (Procedure for Change and Fees) (Scotland) Regulations 2014 (S.S.I. 2014 No. 361)
- The Marriage (Same Sex Couples) (Jurisdiction and Recognition of Judgments) (Scotland) Regulations 2014 (revoked) (S.S.I. 2014 No. 362)
- The Budget (Scotland) Act 2014 Amendment Order 2014 (S.S.I. 2014 No. 363)
- The Public Water Supplies (Scotland) Regulations 2014 (S.S.I. 2014 No. 364)
- The Children and Young People (Scotland) Act 2014 (Commencement No. 6) Order 2014 (S.S.I. 2014 No. 365 (C. 33))
- The Criminal Legal Aid (Fixed Payments and Assistance by Way of Representation) (Scotland) (Miscellaneous Amendments) Regulations 2014 (S.S.I. 2014 No. 366)
- The Scottish Landfill Tax (Prescribed Landfill Site Activities) Order 2014 (S.S.I. 2014 No. 367)
- The Historic Environment Scotland Act 2014 (Commencement No. 1) Order 2014 (S.S.I. 2014 No. 368 (C. 34))
- The Building (Scotland) Act 2003 (Charging Orders) Regulations 2014 (S.S.I. 2014 No. 369)
- The Revenue Scotland and Tax Powers Act 2014 (Commencement No. 2) Order 2014 (S.S.I. 2014 No. 370 (C. 35))
- Act of Sederunt (Rules of the Court of Session and Sheriff Court Rules Amendment No. 3) (Mutual Recognition of Protection Measures) 2014 (S.S.I. 2014 No. 371)
- The Children (Performances and Activities) (Scotland) Regulations 2014 (S.S.I. 2014 No. 372)
- The Designation of Nitrate Vulnerable Zones (Scotland) Regulations 2014 (revoked) (S.S.I. 2014 No. 373)
- The Sports Grounds and Sporting Events (Designation) (Scotland) Amendment Order 2014 (S.S.I. 2014 No. 374)
- The Land and Buildings Transaction Tax (Administration) (Scotland) Regulations 2014 (S.S.I. 2014 No. 375)
- The Land and Buildings Transaction Tax (Ancillary Provision) (Scotland) Order 2014 (S.S.I. 2014 No. 376)
- The Land and Buildings Transaction Tax (Transitional Provisions) (Scotland) Order 2014 (S.S.I. 2014 No. 377)
- The A90 Trunk Road (Cortes) (Prohibition of Waiting) Order 2014 (S.S.I. 2014 No. 378)
- The Sea Fishing (Points for Masters of Fishing Boats) (Scotland) Regulations 2014 (S.S.I. 2014 No. 379)
- The A85 Trunk Road (Comrie) (Temporary Prohibition On Use of Road) Order 2014 (S.S.I. 2014 No. 380)
- The North East Scotland Trunk Roads (Temporary Prohibitions of Traffic and Overtaking and Temporary Speed Restrictions) (No. 12) Order 2014 (S.S.I. 2014 No. 381)
- The North West Scotland Trunk Roads (Temporary Prohibitions of Traffic and Overtaking and Temporary Speed Restrictions) (No. 12) Order 2014 (S.S.I. 2014 No. 382)
- The South East Scotland Trunk Roads (Temporary Prohibitions of Traffic and Overtaking and Temporary Speed Restrictions) (No. 12) Order 2014 (S.S.I. 2014 No. 383)
- The South West Scotland Trunk Roads (Temporary Prohibitions of Traffic and Overtaking and Temporary Speed Restrictions) (No. 12) Order 2014 (S.S.I. 2014 No. 384)
- The A82 Trunk Road (Crianlarich Bypass) (Temporary 30 mph Speed Restriction) Order 2014 (S.S.I. 2014 No. 385)
