= List of Scottish statutory instruments, 1999 =

This is a complete list of Scottish statutory instruments in 1999.

== 1-100 ==
- Environmental Impact Assessment (Scotland) Regulations 1999 (S.S.I. 1999/1)
- Food Protection (Emergency Prohibitions) (Amnesic Shellfish Poisoning) (No. 2) Order 1999 (S.S.I. 1999/3)
- Food Protection (Emergency Prohibitions) (Amnesic Shellfish Poisoning) (Scotland) Order 1999 (S.S.I. 1999/7)
- Food Protection (Emergency Prohibitions) (Amnesic Shellfish Poisoning) (No.2) (Scotland) Order 1999 (S.S.I. 1999/13)
- Food (Animals and Animal Products from Belgium) (Emergency Control) (Scotland) Order 1999 (S.S.I. 1999/14)
- Animal Feedingstuffs from Belgium (Control) (Scotland) Regulations 1999 (S.S.I. 1999/15)
- Food Protection (Emergency Prohibitions) (Amnesic Shellfish Poisoning) (No.3) (Scotland) Order 1999 (S.S.I. 1999/18)
- Plant Health (Amendment) (Scotland) Order 1999 (S.S.I. 1999/22)
- Food Protection (Emergency Prohibitions) (Amnesic Shellfish Poisoning) (No. 4) (Scotland) Order 1999 (S.S.I. 1999/23)
- Food Protection (Emergency Prohibitions) (Amnesic Shellfish Poisoning) (East Coast) (Scotland) Order 1999 (S.S.I. 1999/25)
- Food Protection (Emergency Prohibitions) (Amnesic Shellfish Poisoning) (West Coast) (Scotland) Order 1999 (S.S.I. 1999/26)
- Food Protection (Emergency Prohibitions) (Amnesic Shellfish Poisoning) (Orkney) (Scotland) Order 1999 (S.S.I. 1999/27)
- Food (Animals and Animal Products from Belgium) (Emergency Control) (No.2) (Scotland) Order 1999 (S.S.I. 1999/32)
- Animal Feedingstuffs from Belgium (Control) (No.2) (Scotland) Regulations 1999 (S.S.I. 1999/33)
- Spreadable Fats (Marketing Standards) (Scotland) Regulations 1999 (S.S.I. 1999/34)
- Fraserburgh Harbour Revision Order 1999 (S.S.I. 1999/40)
- Food Protection (Emergency Prohibitions) (Amnesic Shellfish Poisoning) (East Coast) Revocation (Scotland) Order 1999 (S.S.I. 1999/41)
- Food Protection (Emergency Prohibitions) (Amnesic Shellfish Poisoning) (Orkney) (No.2) (Scotland) Order 1999 (S.S.I. 1999/42)
- Environmental Impact Assessment (Forestry) (Scotland) Regulations 1999 (S.S.I. 1999/43)
- Criminal Legal Aid (Fixed Payments) (Scotland) Amendment Regulations 1999 (S.S.I. 1999/48)
- Food Protection (Emergency Prohibitions) (Amnesic Shellfish Poisoning) (Orkney) Partial Revocation (Scotland) Order 1999 (S.S.I. 1999/49)
- Food Protection (Emergency Prohibitions) (Amnesic Shellfish Poisoning) (West Coast) (No.2) (Scotland) Order 1999 (S.S.I. 1999/50)
- National Health Service (General Dental Services) (Scotland) Amendment (No.2) Regulations 1999 (S.S.I. 1999/51)
- Scottish Dental Practice Board Amendment Regulations 1999 (S.S.I. 1999/52)
- National Health Service (Service Committees and Tribunal) (Scotland) Amendment Regulations 1999 (S.S.I. 1999/53)
- National Health Service (General Medical Services) (Scotland) Amendment (No.4) Regulations 1999 (S.S.I. 1999/54)
- National Health Service (General Ophthalmic Services) (Scotland) Amendment (No.2) Regulations 1999 (S.S.I. 1999/55)
- Health Act 1999 (Fund-Holding Practices) (Transfer of Assets, Savings, Rights and Liabilities and Transitional Provisions) (Scotland) Order 1999 (S.S.I. 1999/56)
- National Health Service (Pharmaceutical Services) (Scotland) Amendment Regulations 1999 (S.S.I. 1999/57)
- Smoke Control Areas (Exempted Fireplaces) (Scotland) Order 1999 (S.S.I. 1999/58)
- Road Traffic (Permitted Parking Area and Special Parking Area) (City of Glasgow) Designation Order 1999 (S.S.I. 1999/59)
- Road Traffic (Parking Adjudicators) (City of Glasgow) Regulations 1999 (S.S.I. 1999/60)
- Road Traffic Act 1991 (Amendment of Schedule 3) (Scotland) Order 1999 (S.S.I. 1999/61)
- Parking Attendants (Wearing of Uniforms) (City of Glasgow Parking Area) Regulations 1999 (S.S.I. 1999/62)
- National Health Service (Travelling Expenses and Remission of Charges) (Scotland) Amendment Regulations 1999 (S.S.I. 1999/63)
- National Health Service (Optical Charges and Payments) (Scotland) Amendment (No.2) Regulations 1999 (S.S.I. 1999/64)
- Educational Development, Research and Services (Scotland) Grant Regulations 1999 (S.S.I. 1999/65)
- Food Protection (Emergency Prohibitions) (Amnesic Shellfish Poisoning) (West Coast) (No. 3) (Scotland) Order 1999 (S.S.I. 1999/71)
- Food Protection (Emergency Prohibitions) (Amnesic Shellfish Poisoning) (East Coast) (No. 2) (Scotland) Order 1999 (S.S.I. 1999/72)
- Food Protection (Emergency Prohibitions) (Amnesic Shellfish Poisoning) (Orkney) (No. 3) (Scotland) Order 1999 (S.S.I. 1999/73)
- Argyll and Clyde Acute Hospitals National Health Service Trust (Establishment) Amendment (No. 2) Order 1999 (S.S.I. 1999/77)
- Lanarkshire Acute Hospitals National Health Service Trust (Establishment) Amendment Order 1999 (S.S.I. 1999/78)
- Forth Valley Acute Hospitals National Health Service Trust (Establishment) Amendment Order 1999 (S.S.I. 1999/79)
- Highland Acute Hospitals National Health Service Trust (Establishment) Amendment Order 1999 (S.S.I. 1999/80)
- Lothian University Hospitals National Health Service Trust (Establishment) Amendment (No. 2) Order 1999 (S.S.I. 1999/81)
- Grampian University Hospitals National Health Service Trust (Establishment) Amendment Order 1999 (S.S.I. 1999/82)
- Tayside Primary Care National Health Service Trust (Establishment) Amendment (No.2) Order 1999 (S.S.I. 1999/83)
- Tayside University Hospitals National Health Service Trust (Establishment) Amendment Order 1999 (S.S.I. 1999/84)
- South Glasgow University Hospitals National Health Service Trust (Establishment) Amendment Order 1999 (S.S.I. 1999/85)
- North Glasgow University Hospitals National Health Service Trust (Establishment) Amendment Order 1999 (S.S.I. 1999/86)
- Greater Glasgow Primary Care National Health Service Trust (Establishment) Amendment Order 1999 (S.S.I. 1999/87)
- Lobsters and Crawfish (Prohibition of Fishing and Landing) (Scotland) Order 1999 (S.S.I. 1999/88)
- Lanarkshire Primary Care National Health Service Trust (Establishment) Amendment Order 1999 (S.S.I. 1999/89)
- Health Act 1999 (Commencement No. 4) Order 1999 (S.S.I. 1999/90)
- West Lothian Healthcare National Health Service Trust(Establishment) Amendment Order 1999 (S.S.I. 1999/91)
- Borders Primary Care National Health Service Trust (Establishment)Amendment Order 1999 (S.S.I. 1999/92)
- Highland Primary Care National Health Service Trust (Establishment)Amendment (No. 2) Order 1999 (S.S.I. 1999/93)
- Fife Primary Care National Health Service Trust (Establishment)Amendment Order 1999 (S.S.I. 1999/94)
- Lothian Primary Care National Health Service Trust (Establishment)Amendment Order 1999 (S.S.I. 1999/95)
- Dumfries and Galloway Primary Care National Health Service Trust(Establishment) Amendment Order 1999 (S.S.I. 1999/96)
- Renfrewshire and Inverclyde Primary Care National Health ServiceTrust (Establishment) Amendment Order 1999 (S.S.I. 1999/97)
- Grampian Primary Care National Health Service Trust (Establishment)Amendment Order 1999 (S.S.I. 1999/98)
- Lomond and Argyll Primary Care National Health Service Trust(Establishment) Amendment Order 1999 (S.S.I. 1999/99)

== 101-200 ==
- Registration of Births, Still-Births, Deaths and Marriages (Prescription of Forms) (Scotland) Amendment Regulations 1999 (S.S.I. 1999/104)
- Organic Aid (Scotland) Amendment Regulations 1999 (S.S.I. 1999/107)
- Act of Sederunt (Rules of the Court of Session Amendment No. 7) (Miscellaneous) 1999 (S.S.I. 1999/109)
- Food Protection (Emergency Prohibitions) (Amnesic Shellfish Poisoning) (East Coast) (No. 3) (Scotland) Order 1999 (S.S.I. 1999/110)
- Land Registration (Scotland) Act 1979 (Commencement No. 13) Order 1999 (S.S.I. 1999/111)
- Food Protection (Emergency Prohibitions) (Amnesic Shellfish Poisoning) (West Coast) Partial Revocation (Scotland) Order 1999 (S.S.I. 1999/114)
- Health Act 1999 (Commencement No. 6) (Scotland) Order 1999 (S.S.I. 1999/115)
- Erskine Bridge (Temporary Suspension of Tolls) Order 1999 (S.S.I. 1999/116)
- National Health Service (Penalty Charge) (Scotland) Regulations 1999 (S.S.I. 1999/121)
- Education (Student Loans) (Scotland) Amendment Regulations 1999 (S.S.I. 1999/124)
- Food Protection (Emergency Prohibitions) (Amnesic Shellfish Poisoning) (North Coast) (Scotland) Order 1999 (S.S.I. 1999/125)
- Thurso College (Change of Name) (Scotland) Order 1999 (S.S.I. 1999/126)
- West of Scotland Water Authority (Lochranza - Allt Easan Biorach) Water Order 1999 (S.S.I. 1999/127)
- West of Scotland Water Authority (Kilberry, Allt Dail A'Chairn) Water Order 1999 (S.S.I. 1999/128)
- Plant Health (Scotland) Amendment (No. 2) Order 1999 (S.S.I. 1999/129)
- Wafer Scottish Seal Directions 1999 (S.S.I. 1999/130)
- Water Industry Act 1999 (Commencement No. 1) (Scotland) Order 1999 (S.S.I. 1999/133)
- Shellfish (Specification of Molluscs and Crustaceans) (Scotland) Regulations 1999 (S.S.I. 1999/139)
- Council Tax (Exempt Dwellings) (Scotland) Amendment (No. 2) Order 1999 (S.S.I. 1999/140)
- Food Protection (Emergency Prohibitions) (Amnesic Shellfish Poisoning) (West Coast) Partial Revocation (No. 2) (Scotland) Order 1999 (S.S.I. 1999/141)
- Food Protection (Emergency Prohibitions) (Amnesic Shellfish Poisoning) (West Coast) (No. 4) (Scotland) Order 1999 (S.S.I. 1999/143)
- Food Protection (Emergency Prohibitions) (Amnesic Shellfish Poisoning) (Orkney) (No. 3) (Scotland) Partial Revocation Order 1999 (S.S.I. 1999/144)
- Food Protection (Emergency Prohibitions) (Amnesic Shellfish Poisoning) (East Coast) (No. 3) (Scotland) Partial Revocation Order 1999 (S.S.I. 1999/145)
- Act of Sederunt (Fees of Solicitors in the Sheriff Court) (Amendment) 1999 (S.S.I. 1999/149)
- Act of Sederunt (Fees of Sheriff Officers) 1999 (S.S.I. 1999/150)
- Act of Sederunt (Fees of Messengers-at-Arms) 1999 (S.S.I. 1999/151)
- Non-Domestic Rating Contributions (Scotland) Amendment Regulations 1999 (S.S.I. 1999/153)
- Local Statutory Provisions (Postponement from Repeal) (Scotland) Order 1999 (S.S.I. 1999/156)
- Local Statutory Provisions (Exemption from Repeal) (Scotland) Order 1999 (S.S.I. 1999/157)
- Maximum Number of Judges (Scotland) Order 1999 (S.S.I. 1999/158)
- Food Protection (Emergency Prohibitions) (Amnesic Shellfish Poisoning) (Orkney) (No. 3) (Scotland) Revocation Order 1999 (S.S.I. 1999/159)
- Food Protection (Emergency Prohibitions) (Amnesic Shellfish Poisoning) (Orkney) (No. 2) (Scotland) Partial Revocation Order 1999 (S.S.I. 1999/160)
- Forth Valley Primary Care National Health Service Trust (Establishment) Amendment (No. 2) Order 1999 (S.S.I. 1999/164)
- Ayrshire and Arran Primary Care National Health Service Trust (Establishment) Amendment (No. 2) Order 1999 (S.S.I. 1999/165)
- Act of Sederunt (Rules of the Court of Session Amendment No. 8) (Fees of Solicitors) 1999 (S.S.I. 1999/166)
- Food Protection (Emergency Prohibitions) (Amnesic Shellfish Poisoning) (West Coast) (No. 2) Revocation (Scotland) Order 1999 (S.S.I. 1999/167)
- Food Protection (Emergency Prohibitions) (Amnesic Shellfish Poisoning) (West Coast) (No.3) Revocation (Scotland) Order 1999 (S.S.I. 1999/168)
- Food Protection (Emergency Prohibitions) (Amnesic Shellfish Poisoning) (West Coast) Partial Revocation (No. 3) (Scotland) Order 1999 (S.S.I. 1999/169)
- Food Protection (Emergency Prohibitions) (Amnesic Shellfish Poisoning) (West Coast) (No. 4) Revocation (Scotland) Order 1999 (S.S.I. 1999/170)
- Contaminants in Food Amendment (Scotland) Regulations 1999 (S.S.I. 1999/171)
- Macduff Harbour Revision Order 1999 (S.S.I. 1999/172)
- Building Standards and Procedure Amendment (Scotland) Regulations 1999 (S.S.I. 1999/173)
- Scotland Act 1998 (Transitory and Transitional Provisions) (Appropriations) Amendment Order 1999 (S.S.I. 1999/175)
- Breeding of Dogs (Licensing Records) (Scotland) Regulations 1999 (S.S.I. 1999/176)
- Sale of Dogs (Identification Tag) (Scotland) Regulations 1999 (S.S.I. 1999/177)
- Beef Bones (Scotland) Regulations 1999 (S.S.I. 1999/186)
- Hill Livestock (Compensatory Allowances) (Scotland) Regulations 1999 (S.S.I. 1999/187)
- River Forth Salmon Fishery District (Baits and Lures) Regulations 1999 (S.S.I. 1999/188)
- River Don Salmon Fishery District (Baits and Lures) Regulations 1999 (S.S.I. 1999/189)
- Act of Adjournal (Criminal Procedure Rules Amendment No. 4) (Drug Treatment and Testing Orders) 1999 (S.S.I. 1999/191)
- Act of Sederunt (Rules of the Court of Session Amendment No.9) (Finance Act 1999) 1999 (S.S.I. 1999/192)
- The Shetland Islands Regulated Fishery (Scotland) Order 1999 (S.S.I. 1999/194)
- National Health Service (Scotland) (Injury Benefits) Amendment (No.2) Regulations 1999 (S.S.I. 1999/195)
- Invergarry-Kyle of Lochalsh Trunk Road (A87) Extension (Skye Bridge Crossing) Toll Order (Variation) Order 1999 (S.S.I. 1999/196)
- Ayrshire and Arran Acute Hospitals National Health Service Trust (Establishment) Amendment (No. 2) Order 1999 (S.S.I. 1999/197)
- Fife Acute Hospitals National Health Service Trust (Establishment) Amendment (No. 2) Order 1999 (S.S.I. 1999/198)
- National Trust for Scotland (Canna) Harbour Revision Order 1999 (S.S.I. 1999/199)
- Montrose Harbour Revision Order 1999 (S.S.I. 1999/200)

== 201-203 ==
- Highland Council (Eigg) Harbour Empowerment Order 1999 (S.S.I. 1999/201)
- Scottish Natural Heritage (Rum) Harbour Empowerment Order 1999 (S.S.I. 1999/202)
- Highland Council (Muck) Harbour Empowerment Order 1999 (S.S.I. 1999/203)
