= Scottish statutory instrument =

Type of law in Scotland

A Scottish statutory instrument (SSI; Scottish Gaelic: Ionnsramaid Reachdail na h-Alba) is subordinate legislation made by the Scottish Ministers, as well as subordinate legislation made by public bodies using powers provided to be exercisable by Scottish statutory instrument. SSIs are the main form of subordinate legislation in Scotland, being used by default to exercise powers delegated to the Scottish Ministers, the Lord Advocate, the High Court of Justiciary, the Court of Session, and the King-in-Council.

The Interpretation and Legislative Reform (Scotland) Act 2010 defines what a Scottish statutory instrument is. Before this Act, SSIs were governed by the Statutory Instruments Act 1946, which continues to govern UK statutory instruments.

SSIs, and the power to enable the creation of subordinate legislation in general, are not mentioned in the original text of the Scotland Act 1998, which devolved powers to the Scottish Parliament. Rather, this power is implied by the statement that Acts of the Scottish Parliament are law to the extent that they are not "outside the legislative competence of the Parliament," without any subsequent reservation of the power to make subordinate legislation.

Before Scottish devolution, subordinate legislation applying only to Scotland was published as a subseries of the larger UK statutory instrument (SI) series. This subseries is now used for SIs which deal with reserved matters in relation to Scotland.

== Purpose ==
An SSI is made, with some exceptions, by a body exercising executive governmental functions – that is, a body responsible for putting the law into effect ("executing" the law) rather than a body responsible for defining the law (the legislature) or a body responsible for interpreting the law (the judicature). As a result, an SSI will provide specific details on how an Act should be put into effect and may amend existing Acts or SSIs to reflect that the law has changed. In other cases, an SSI may repeal parts of the law which had before been impliedly repealed.

For example, section 15 of the Charities and Trustee Investment (Scotland) Act 2005 allows the Scottish Ministers to make regulations setting out how charities refer to themselves in documents, and the Charities References in Documents (Scotland) Regulations 2007 sets out in regulation 2 how a charity must refer to itself, and in regulation 4 on which documents a charity must make such references.

In other cases, an SSI may be used to bring into force parts of the law through so-called "commencement orders." In these cases, sections of Acts may have no legal force until brought into force, which may allow time for accommodating preparations to be made. One example of a commencement order is the Bankruptcy (Scotland) Act 2016 (Commencement) Regulations 2016, which brought almost the entirety of the Bankruptcy (Scotland) Act 2016 into force.

Another example, although not involving SSIs, is the Health and Safety at Work etc. Act 1974, which applies to Scotland and makes provisions relating to ensuring safety in the workplace. This Act covers a wide remit, and so UK SIs have been issued under the same sections to cover different industries. Specifically, some sections of this Act which allow making SIs were used to make both the Control of Substances Hazardous to Health Regulations 2002 and the Control of Vibration at Work Regulations 2005 even though those regulations are not related.

== Procedure ==
=== Enabling ===
An SSI may only be made where an Act of the Scottish Parliament or Act of the UK Parliament gives that power. Such an Act is known variously as an enabling or parent Act, and sets out the scope of the power to make SSIs, and the associated procedure for exercising that power. An SSI may only make provision within the scope of its enabling power, and any provision outside that scope is invalid.

=== Making ===
An SSI is "made" when it is signed by a person or body who has the power to make that SSI – typically the Scottish Ministers. This terminology appears to be inherited from the UK Parliament, as the Scottish Parliament has not provided official guidance specifically defining the term.

=== Laying ===
The "laying" of an SSI is the putting of that SSI before the Scottish Parliament for the Parliament's consideration. The phrase comes from laying before the house, which originally referred to the placing of a (physical) document on the table in the assembly chamber. All SSIs are required to be laid before Parliament in the manner specified by the Parliament's standing orders, although not laying an SSI before Parliament does not invalidate it. The date an SSI is laid is also generally the date from which parliamentary scrutiny may begin.

=== Scrutiny ===
Once an SSI is laid before Parliament, it may be scrutinised. Scrutiny is generally performed by the Delegated Powers and Law Reform Committee (DPLRC), which considers whether the Scottish Ministers are competent in making the SSI and whether the SSI of sufficient quality. That is, the committee considers whether the Ministers have the power to make that SSI under the enabling Act, whether the Scottish Parliament has the power to make law in that area under the Scotland Acts, and whether the provisions of the SSI are clear, consistent, and free of typographical errors.

The DPLRC and other committees report back to Parliament, which applies a varying level of scrutiny depending on the exact procedure for that SSI.

==== Negative procedure ====
A negative SSI is an SSI subject to negative procedure. Such SSIs must be laid before Parliament at least 28 days before they come into force, and may be annulled by Parliament resolution within 40 days of their being laid. If an SSI is annulled after it comes into force, it ceases to have force from the date of annulment.

==== Affirmative procedure ====
An affirmative SSI is subject to affirmative procedure. These SSIs must be approved by resolution of Parliament before they can come into force.

==== Special parliamentary procedure ====
Some SSIs are subject to special parliamentary procedure. These are so-called special procedure orders (SPOs), and differ from SSIs subject to other types of procedure in that notice of SPOs must be posted in the Edinburgh Gazette (or a local newspaper, if the SPO relates to a particular area) and in that members of the public may object to an SPO.

If an SPO is objected to, it must be laid before the Parliament with its objections and then confirmed by an Act of the Scottish Parliament. If no objections are made, the Parliament may annul the order within 40 days of its being laid. If no objections are made and the Parliament does not annul the SPO, the SPO comes into force at the end of the 40-day period or at a later date if the SPO so specifies.

==== Other procedures ====
In addition to the above procedures, which are defined by the Interpretation and Legislative Reform (Scotland) Act 2010, an enabling Act may specify its own procedure for making SSIs. SSIs made under another procedure must be laid before Parliament "as soon as practicable after [they are] made," with some exemptions. As of October 2016, the exempted enactments are:

- Harbours Act 1964
- Water (Scotland) Act 1980
- Road Traffic Regulation Act 1984
- Roads (Scotland) Act 1984
- Salmon Act 1986
- National Heritage (Scotland) Act 1991
- Political Parties, Elections and Referendums Act 2010
- Salmon and Freshwater Fisheries (Consolidation) (Scotland) Act 2003
- Scotland Act 1998 (River Tweed) Order 2006
- Transport and Works (Scotland) Act 2007
- Equality Act 2010

Examples of these other procedures are laid-only procedure, where an SSI is laid before Parliament but cannot be rejected; and super-affirmative procedure, where a draft SSI must be subject to a formal consultation or other requirement before it can be made.

=== Commencement ===
An SSI will not typically have legal force immediately. Rather, it may require parliamentary approval, and may specify a "commencement day" on which it comes into force. For example, the order bringing into force the Bankruptcy (Scotland) Act 2016 was made on 15 September 2016, laid before Parliament on 21 September 2016, and has a commencement day of 30 November 2016.

== Types ==
=== Rules, regulations, and orders ===
While SSIs are separate from UK SIs, they generally appear to follow the same naming convention for rules, regulations, and orders. The Scottish Parliament and Scottish Government have not, however, as of October 2016, published official guidance defining the terms, and so it cannot be known with certainty whether the definitions used for SSIs and SIs are identical.

These definitions were established by the so-called "Donoughmore Committee" of 1932, and recommended in official guidance published by Her Majesty's Stationery Office. The committee recommended that:

- Rules should set out procedure – how specific public bodies conduct themselves.
- Regulations should set out substantive law – how members of the public, companies, and so on conduct themselves.
- Orders should exercise executive power, or the power to take judicial decisions.

These definitions mostly hold true for SSIs, with some key differences. The Parliamentary Counsel Office recommends that, from 2016, rules only be used set out procedure for courts, tribunals and other bodies, and that regulations be used for everything else – including commencement orders. That is not to say that orders are not used, as certain older Acts specify powers to create subordinate legislation as powers to create orders. A common example is the Road Traffic Regulation Act 1984 which, among other powers, provides that an authority "may by order restrict or temporarily prohibit use of [a] road." In 2015, approximately 160 orders were made under this Act, representing around 36% of all SSIs in 2015.

=== Orders in Council ===
An Order in Council is legislation made by the sovereign to exercise executive power, although in reality Orders are made by the Privy Council and approved by the sovereign. An Order in Council is primary legislation when made under the royal prerogative, and subordinate legislation if made under an Act of the Scottish Parliament. When an Order in Council is used to exercise a power granted by an Act, such Orders are made as SSIs.

Orders in Council are often used for making law which modifies how the branches of government work. Orders in Council have been used to adjust how the Scottish Parliament works – for example, to set who is disqualified from being a Member of the Scottish Parliament – and, in the UK SI series, to devolve powers to the Scottish Parliament.

=== Orders of Council ===
An Order of Council is a form of legislation made by the Lords of the Privy Council (in practice, ministers of the Crown).

Orders of Council differ from Orders in Council in that, while Orders in Council are orders made by the King meeting with the Privy Council, Orders of Council are made by the Privy Council in its own right and without requiring the King’s approval. The preamble of all Orders of Council states that the order was made at a meeting of the council held in Whitehall; however, in practice they are all approved through correspondence, and no meeting is actually held.

Orders of Council that are Scottish Statutory Instruments generally relate to higher education, for example under the powers in the Further and Higher Education (Scotland) Act 1992 to make provision for the constitution of governing bodies or regulate the granting of degrees.

=== Acts of Sederunt ===
The Court of Session (the supreme civil court of Scotland) makes Acts of Sederunt to regulate its proceedings, the proceedings of tribunals, and the proceedings of Scotland's sheriff courts when they hear civil matters, including the Sheriff Appeal Court. The majority of the current power of the Court of Session to regulate is derived from the Courts Reform (Scotland) Act 2014, although some other Acts do also empower the Court.

The original power of the Court of Session to regulate stems from the College of Justice Act 1540, which provided the court with the "power to make such acts, statutes and ordinance as they shall think expedient for ordering of processes and the hasty expedition of justice." Prior to this, following the 1532 establishment of the Court, the power to regulate was held by the Parliament of Scotland.

=== Acts of Adjournal ===
An Act of Adjournal is a form of legislation made by the High Court of Justiciary (the supreme criminal court of Scotland) to regulate its proceedings, the proceedings of the sheriff courts and the Sheriff Appeal Court when they hear criminal matters, and the justice of the peace courts. Acts of Adjournal are analogous to Acts of Sederunt, which regulate civil proceedings. The current power to regulate of the High Court comes from section 305 of the Criminal Procedure (Scotland) Act 1995, which allows the court to make Acts concerning practice and procedure including by electronic means, summary procedure fees, payment of fines by prisoners, and to make law necessary for the implementation of Acts of Adjournal and Acts of Parliament.

In addition to this main power, several other modern enactments confer the power to legislate, including the Criminal Justice (Scotland) Act 2003, and its amendments to the Criminal Procedure (Scotland) Act 1995, the Criminal Justice and Licensing (Scotland) Act 2010 and its amendments to the 1995 Act, the Courts Reform (Scotland) Act 2014 which amended the 1995 Act and the Public Records (Scotland) Act 1937, and the Criminal Justice (Scotland) Act 2016, and its amendments to the 1995 Act,

== Style ==
=== Numbering ===
SSIs are numbered by the year they were made, and consecutively by the order they were received by the Queen's Printer for Scotland in that year. Unlike with Acts of the Scottish Parliament, where Acts are numbered in exactly the order they are received, there is no such requirement for the numbering of SSIs – an SSI need only be ordered "as nearly as possible" in the order the Queen's Printer receives them.

=== Citation ===
The recommended ways of citing an SSI are by its title – for example, The Letting Agent Registration (Scotland) Regulations 2016 – or by its year and number (e.g. S.S.I. 2016/432). Some style guides recommend the use of both forms in a citation (as in The Letting Agent Registration (Scotland) Regulations 2016, S.S.I. 2016/432 or another similar form).

=== Divisions ===
Divisions of a Scottish Statutory Instrument
Division	Numbering	Name		
Division	Numbering	Orders	Regulations	Rules
1st	1, 2, 3, ...	Article	Regulation	Rule
2nd	(1), (2), (3), ...	Paragraph		
3rd	(a), (b), (c), ...	Sub-paragraph		

The parts an SSI is divided into have different names depending on the type of SSI and, although no official guidance has been published by the Scottish Government or Scottish Parliament, the names of the divisions appear to be identical to the names used for UK SIs.

The divisions shown in the table are for the main body matter of the SSI, and the Orders column includes Orders in Council. It is also common, regardless of the traditional name of the division, to refer to a division generally as a "clause," such as in "interpretation clause" (which would provide information on how the instrument is to be interpreted). In addition to these numbered (or lettered) paragraphs, an SSI can contain unnumbered paragraphs.

As with Acts of the Scottish Parliament, SSIs can have schedules annexed to them. Schedules to SSIs are divided in the same manner as Acts.

== See also ==
- Act of the Scottish Parliament
- List of Scottish statutory instruments
- Delegated legislation in the United Kingdom
