= List of Scottish statutory instruments, 2015 =

This is a complete list of Scottish statutory instruments in 2015.

== 1-100 ==
- The Civil Jurisdiction and Judgments (Amendment) (Scotland) Regulations 2015( S.S.I. 2015 No. 1)
- The A82 Trunk Road (Laggan Swing Bridge) (Temporary Width Restriction) Order 2015 (S.S.I. 2015 No. 2)
- The Scottish Landfill Tax (Administration) Regulations 2015 (S.S.I. 2015 No. 3)
- The Lerwick Harbour Revision Order 2015 (S.S.I. 2015 No. 4)
- Act of Sederunt (Sheriff Court Adoption Rules Amendment) 2015 (S.S.I. 2015 No. 5)
- The Caledonian Maritime Assets (Brodick) Harbour Revision Order 2015 (S.S.I. 2015 No. 6)
- The Local Governance (Scotland) Act 2004 (Remuneration and Severance Payments) Amendment Regulations 2015 (S.S.I. 2015 No. 7)
- The Disabled Persons’ Parking Badges (Scotland) Act 2014 (Commencement) Order 2015 (S.S.I. 2015 No. 8 (C. 1))
- The Disabled Persons (Badges for Motor Vehicles) (Scotland) Amendment Regulations 2015 (S.S.I. 2015 No. 9)
- The Plant Health (Scotland) Amendment Order 2015 (revoked) (S.S.I. 2015 No. 10)
- The Tweed Regulation Amendment Order 2015 (S.S.I. 2015 No. 11)
- The Courts Reform (Scotland) Act 2014 (Commencement No. 1) Order 2015 (S.S.I. 2015 No. 12 (C. 2))
- The Advice and Assistance (Assistance by Way of Representation) (Scotland) Amendment Regulations 2015 (S.S.I. 2015 No. 13)
- The Marriage and Civil Partnership (Scotland) Act 2014 (Commencement No. 4 and Savings Provisions) Order 2015 (S.S.I. 2015 No. 14 (C. 3))
- The A82 Trunk Road (Camusnagual Ferry to Fort William), The A830 Trunk Road (Caledonian Canal Swing Bridge) (Redetermination of Means of Exercise of Public Right of Passage) Order 2015 (S.S.I. 2015 No. 15)
- The Revenue Scotland (First Planning Period) Order 2015 (S.S.I. 2015 No. 16)
- The Landfill Tax (Scotland) Act 2014 (Commencement No. 2) Order 2015 (S.S.I. 2015 No. 17 (C. 4))
- The Revenue Scotland and Tax Powers Act 2014 (Commencement No. 3) Order 2015 (S.S.I. 2015 No. 18 (C. 5))
- The Firefighters’ Pension Scheme (Scotland) Regulations 2015 (S.S.I. 2015 No. 19)
- The Secure Accommodation (Scotland) Amendment Regulations 2015 (S.S.I. 2015 No. 20)
- The Children's Hearings (Scotland) Act 2011 (Rules of Procedure in Children's Hearings) Amendment Rules 2015 (S.S.I. 2015 No. 21)
- The South West Scotland Trunk Roads (Temporary Prohibitions of Traffic and Overtaking and Temporary Speed Restrictions) (No. 1) Order 2015 (S.S.I. 2015 No. 22)
- The South East Scotland Trunk Roads (Temporary Prohibitions of Traffic and Overtaking and Temporary Speed Restrictions) (No. 1) Order 2015 (S.S.I. 2015 No. 23)
- he North West Scotland Trunk Roads (Temporary Prohibitions of Traffic and Overtaking and Temporary Speed Restrictions) (No. 1) Order 2015( S.S.I. 2015 No. 24)
- The North East Scotland Trunk Roads (Temporary Prohibitions of Traffic and Overtaking and Temporary Speed Restrictions) (No. 1) Order 2015 (S.S.I. 2015 No. 25)
- Act of Sederunt (Rules of the Court of Session Amendment) (Regulation (EU) No. 1215/2012) 2015 (S.S.I. 2015 No. 26)
- The A9 Trunk Road (Kincraig to Dalraddy Dualling) (Temporary Prohibitions of Traffic and Overtaking and Temporary Speed Restriction) Order 2015 (S.S.I. 2015 No. 27)
- The Little Loch Broom Scallops Several Fishery Order 2015 (S.S.I. 2015 No. 28)
- Not Allocated (S.S.I. 2015 No. 29)
- The Loch Ewe, Isle of Ewe, Wester Ross, Scallops Several Fishery Order 2015 (S.S.I. 2015 No. 30)
- The Historic Environment Scotland Act 2014 (Commencement No. 2) Order 2015 (S.S.I. 2015 No. 31 (C. 6))
- The Regulation of Investigatory Powers (Modification of Authorisation Provisions: Legal Consultations) (Scotland) Order 2015 (S.S.I. 2015 No. 32)
- The Regulation of Investigatory Powers (Covert Human Intelligence Sources – Code of Practice) (Scotland) Order 2015 (S.S.I. 2015 No. 33)
- The Regulation of Investigatory Powers (Covert Surveillance and Property Interference – Code of Practice) (Scotland) Order 2015 (S.S.I. 2015 No. 34)
- Act of Sederunt (Rules of the Court of Session Amendment No. 2) (Regulatory Reform (Scotland) Act 2014) 2015 (S.S.I. 2015 No. 35)
- The Revenue Scotland and Tax Powers Act (Fees for Payment) Regulations 2015 (S.S.I. 2015 No. 36)
- The Revenue Scotland and Tax Powers Act (Involved Third Party) Order 2015 (S.S.I. 2015 No. 37)
- The Revenue Scotland and Tax Powers Act (Privileged Communications) Regulations 2015 (S.S.I. 2015 No. 38)
- The Public Services Reform (Inspection and Monitoring of Prisons) (Scotland) Order 2015 (S.S.I. 2015 No. 39)
- The M8, M74 and A725 Trunk Roads (Newhouse, Raith, Daldowie and Easterhouse to Bargeddie) (Temporary Prohibition on Use of Road) Order 2015 (S.S.I. 2015 No. 40)
- The M90/A90 Trunk Road (Kingsway, Dundee) (50 mph and 40 mph Speed Limit) Order 2015 (S.S.I. 2015 No. 41)
- The A96 Trunk Road (Auchmill Road) (Temporary Prohibition of Specified Turns) Order 2015 (S.S.I. 2015 No. 42)
- The Reservoirs (Scotland) Act 2011 (Commencement No. 2) Order 2015 (S.S.I. 2015 No. 43 (C. 7))
- The Public Bodies (Joint Working) (Scotland) Act 2014 (Commencement No. 2) Amendment Order 2015 (S.S.I. 2015 No. 44 (C. 8))
- The Scottish Landfill Tax (Qualifying Material) Order 2015 (S.S.I. 2015 No. 45)
- The Council Tax Reduction (Scotland) Amendment Regulations 2015 (S.S.I. 2015 No. 46)
- The Non-Domestic Rate (Scotland) Order 2015 (S.S.I. 2015 No. 47)
- The Fish Labelling (Scotland) Amendment Regulations 2015 (S.S.I. 2015 No. 48)
- The Non-Domestic Rates (Levying) (Scotland) Amendment Regulations 2015 (S.S.I. 2015 No. 49)
- The Non-Domestic Rating (Valuation of Utilities) (Scotland) Amendment Order 2015 (S.S.I. 2015 No. 50)
- The Valuation Timetable (Scotland) Amendment Order 2015 (S.S.I. 2015 No. 51)
- The Regulatory Reform (Scotland) Act 2014 (Commencement No. 2 and Transitional Provision) Order 2015 (S.S.I. 2015 No. 52 (C. 9) )
- The Scottish Courts and Tribunals Service (Procedure for Appointment of Members) Regulations 2015 (S.S.I. 2015 No. 53)
- The Bankruptcy and Debt Advice (Scotland) Act 2014 (Commencement No. 2, Savings and Transitionals) Amendment Order 2015 (S.S.I. 2015 No. 54 (C. 10))
- The A9 Trunk Road (Kincraig to Dalraddy Dualling) (Temporary Prohibitions of Traffic and Overtaking and Temporary Speed Restriction) (No. 2) Order 2015 (S.S.I. 2015 No. 55)
- The Local Government Finance (Scotland) Order 2015 (S.S.I. 2015 No. 56)
- The M8/A8 Trunk Road (Junction 4) (Temporary Weight Restriction) Order 2015 (S.S.I. 2015 No. 57)
- The Common Agricultural Policy (Direct Payments etc.) (Scotland) Regulations 2015 (S.S.I. 2015 No. 58)
- The Local Government Finance Act 1992 (Commencement No. 11) Order 2015 (S.S.I. 2015 No. 59 (C. 11))
- The Local Government Pension Scheme (Governance) (Scotland) Regulations 2015 (S.S.I. 2015 No. 60)
- The Children and Young People (Scotland) Act 2014 (Commencement No. 7) Order 2015 (S.S.I. 2015 No. 61 (C. 12))
- The Support and Assistance of Young People Leaving Care (Scotland) Amendment Regulations 2015 (S.S.I. 2015 No. 62)
- The Reservoirs (Scotland) Act 2011 (Commencement No. 3 and Transitional Provisions) Order 2015 (S.S.I. 2015 No. 63 (C. 13))
- The National Assistance (Assessment of Resources) Amendment (Scotland) Regulations 2015 (S.S.I. 2015 No. 64)
- The National Assistance (Sums for Personal Requirements) (Scotland) Regulations 2015 (S.S.I. 2015 No. 65)
- The Public Bodies (Joint Working) (Integration Joint Boards and Integration Joint Monitoring Committees) (Amendment) (Scotland) Order 2015 (S.S.I. 2015 No. 66)
- The South West Scotland Trunk Roads (Temporary Prohibitions of Traffic and Overtaking and Temporary Speed Restrictions) (No. 2) Order 2015 (S.S.I. 2015 No. 67)
- The South East Scotland Trunk Roads (Temporary Prohibitions of Traffic and Overtaking and Temporary Speed Restrictions) (No. 2) Order 2015 (S.S.I. 2015 No. 68)
- The North East Scotland Trunk Roads (Temporary Prohibitions of Traffic and Overtaking and Temporary Speed Restrictions) (No. 2) Order 2015 (S.S.I. 2015 No. 69)
- The North West Scotland Trunk Roads (Temporary Prohibitions of Traffic and Overtaking and Temporary Speed Restrictions) (No. 2) Order 2015 (S.S.I. 2015 No. 70)
- The Land and Buildings Transaction Tax (Transitional Provisions) (Scotland) Amendment Order 2015 (S.S.I. 2015 No. 71)
- The Environmental Protection Act 1990 (Commencement No. 20) (Scotland) Order 2015 (S.S.I. 2015 No. 72 (C. 14))
- The Environment Act 1995 (Commencement No. 24) (Scotland) Order 2015 (S.S.I. 2015 No. 73 (C. 15))
- The Pollution Prevention and Control Act 1999 (Commencement No. 3) (Scotland) Order 2015 (S.S.I. 2015 No. 74 (C. 16))
- The A985 Trunk Road (Kincardine Bridge) (Temporary Bus Lane) Order 2015 (S.S.I. 2015 No. 75)
- The A972 and A90 Trunk Roads (Kingsway Junction) (Temporary Prohibition of Specified Turn) Order 2015 (S.S.I. 2015 No. 76)
- The Courts Reform (Scotland) Act 2014 (Commencement No. 2, Transitional and Saving Provisions) Order 2015 (S.S.I. 2015 No. 77 (C. 17))
- The M9/A9 Trunk Road (Munlochy Junction) (Temporary Prohibition of Specified Turns) Order 2015 (S.S.I. 2015 No. 78)
- The Provision of Water and Sewerage Services (Reasonable Cost) (Scotland) Regulations 2015 (S.S.I. 2015 No. 79)
- The Bankruptcy (Miscellaneous Amendments) (Scotland) Regulations 2015 (S.S.I. 2015 No. 80)
- The Personal Injuries (NHS Charges) (Amounts) (Scotland) Amendment Regulations 2015 (S.S.I. 2015 No. 81)
- The Post-16 Education (Scotland) Act 2013 (Commencement No. 6) Order 2015 (S.S.I. 2015 No. 82 (C. 18))
- The Equality Act 2010 (Specification of Public Authorities) (Scotland) Order 2015 (S.S.I. 2015 No. 83)
- Act of Adjournal (Criminal Procedure Rules Amendment) (Reporting Restrictions) 2015 (S.S.I. 2015 No. 84)
- Act of Sederunt (Rules of the Court of Session and Sheriff Court Rules Amendment No. 3) (Reporting Restrictions) 2015 (S.S.I. 2015 No. 85)
- The National Health Service (Optical Charges and Payments) (Scotland) Amendment Regulations 2015 (S.S.I. 2015 No. 86)
- The Local Government Pension Scheme (Scotland) Amendment Regulations 2015 (S.S.I. 2015 No. 87)
- The Public Bodies (Joint Working) (Integration Joint Board Establishment) (Scotland) Order 2015 (S.S.I. 2015 No. 88)
- The Scottish Road Works Register (Prescribed Fees) Regulations 2015 (S.S.I. 2015 No. 89)
- The Reservoirs (Scotland) Regulations 2015 (S.S.I. 2015 No. 90)
- The National Health Service (Cross-Border Health Care) (Scotland) Amendment Regulations 2015 (S.S.I. 2015 No. 91)
- The Reservoirs (Panels of Reservoir Engineers: Sections under which Members may be Appointed) (Scotland) Order 2015 (S.S.I. 2015 No. 92)
- The Land and Buildings Transaction Tax (Addition and Modification of Reliefs) (Scotland) Order 2015 (S.S.I. 2015 No. 93)
- The National Health Service Pension Scheme (Scotland) Regulations 2015 (S.S.I. 2015 No. 94)
- The National Health Service Pension Scheme (Transitional and Consequential Provisions) (Scotland) Regulations 2015 (S.S.I. 2015 No. 95)
- The National Health Service Superannuation Scheme (Miscellaneous Amendments) (Scotland) Regulations 2015 (S.S.I. 2015 No. 96)
- The Teachers’ Pension Scheme (Scotland) Amendment Regulations 2015 (S.S.I. 2015 No. 97)
- The Teachers’ Superannuation (Scotland) Amendment Regulations 2015 (S.S.I. 2015 No. 98)
- The Food (Scotland) Act 2015 (Commencement) Order 2015 (S.S.I. 2015 No. 99 (C. 19))
- The Food (Scotland) Act 2015 (Consequential and Transitional Provisions) Order 2015 (S.S.I. 2015 No. 100)

== 101-200 ==
- The Waste (Recyclate Quality) (Scotland) Regulations 2015 (S.S.I. 2015 No. 101)
- The National Health Service (Clinical Negligence and Other Risks Indemnity Scheme) (Scotland) Amendment Regulations 2015 (S.S.I. 2015 No. 102)
- The Alien and Locally Absent Species in Aquaculture (Scotland) Regulations 2015 (S.S.I. 2015 No. 103)
- The Children and Young People (Scotland) Act 2014 (Commencement No. 8 and Saving Provision) Order 2015 (S.S.I. 2015 No. 104 (C. 20))
- The Crofting Counties Agricultural Grants (Scotland) Variation Scheme 2015 (S.S.I. 2015 No. 105)
- The M8, M74 and A725 Trunk Roads (Newhouse, Raith, Daldowie and Easterhouse to Bargeddie) (Temporary Prohibition on Use of Road) (No. 2) Order 2015 (S.S.I. 2015 No. 106)
- The European Protection Order (Scotland) Regulations 2015 (S.S.I. 2015 No. 107)
- The Land and Buildings Transaction Tax (Scotland) Act 2013 (Commencement No. 2) Order 2015 (S.S.I. 2015 No. 108 (C. 21))
- The Landfill Tax (Scotland) Act 2014 (Commencement No. 3 and Transitional Provisions) Order 2015 (S.S.I. 2015 No. 109 (C. 22))
- The Revenue Scotland and Tax Powers Act 2014 (Commencement No. 4) Order 2015 (S.S.I. 2015 No. 110 (C. 23))
- The A96 Trunk Road (Inveramsay Bridge Improvement) (Temporary Prohibitions on Traffic, Overtaking and Temporary Speed Restriction) Order 2015 (S.S.I. 2015 No. 111)
- The A83 Trunk Road (Tarbert) (Temporary Prohibition on Waiting, Loading and Unloading) Order 2015 (S.S.I. 2015 No. 112)
- The Aquaculture and Fisheries (Scotland) Act 2007 (Fixed Penalty Notices) Order 2015 (S.S.I. 2015 No. 113)
- The M9/A9 Trunk Road (Munlochy Junction) (Temporary Prohibition of Specified Turns) (No. 2) Order 2015 (S.S.I. 2015 No. 114)
- The Certification of Death (Scotland) Act 2011 (Commencement No. 2) Order 2015 (S.S.I. 2015 No. 115 (C. 24))
- The Tribunals (Scotland) Act 2014 (Commencement No. 2) Order 2015 (S.S.I. 2015 No. 116 (C. 25))
- The Firefighters’ Pension Scheme (Consequential Provisions) (Scotland) Regulations 2015 (S.S.I. 2015 No. 117)
- The Police Pensions (Consequential Provisions) (Scotland) Regulations 2015 (S.S.I. 2015 No. 118)
- Act of Sederunt (Rules of the Court of Session and Sheriff Court Bankruptcy Rules Amendment) (Bankruptcy and Debt Advice (Scotland) Act 2014) 2015 (S.S.I. 2015 No. 119)
- Act of Sederunt (Fitness for Judicial Office Tribunal Rules) 2015 S.S.I. 2015 No. 120)
- Act of Adjournal (Criminal Procedure Rules Amendment No. 2) (European Protection Orders) 2015 (S.S.I. 2015 No. 121)
- The Housing (Scotland) Act 2014 (Commencement No. 2) Order 2015 (S.S.I. 2015 No. 122 (C. 26))
- The Land and Buildings Transaction Tax (Sub-sale Development Relief and Multiple Dwellings Relief) (Scotland) Order 2015 (S.S.I. 2015 No. 123)
- The Proceeds of Crime Act 2002 (Disclosure of Information to and by Lord Advocate and Scottish Ministers) Amendment Order 2015 (S.S.I. 2015 No. 124)
- The Local Government Finance (Scotland) Amendment Order 2015 (S.S.I. 2015 No. 125)
- The Land and Buildings Transaction Tax (Tax Rates and Tax Bands) (Scotland) Order 2015 (S.S.I. 2015 No. 126)
- The Scottish Landfill Tax (Standard Rate and Lower Rate) Order 2015 (S.S.I. 2015 No. 127)
- The Revenue Scotland and Tax Powers Act (Interest on Unpaid Tax and Interest Rates in General) Regulations 2015 (S.S.I. 2015 No. 128)
- The Revenue Scotland and Tax Powers Act (Postponement of Tax Pending a Review or Appeal) Regulations 2015 (S.S.I. 2015 No. 129)
- The Revenue Scotland and Tax Powers Act (Record Keeping) Regulations 2015 (S.S.I. 2015 No. 130)
- The Revenue Scotland and Tax Powers Act (Reimbursement Arrangements) Regulations 2015 (S.S.I. 2015 No. 131)
- The Scottish Tax Tribunals (Voting and Offences etc.) Regulations 2015 (S.S.I. 2015 No. 132)
- The National Bus Travel Concession Scheme for Older and Disabled Persons (Scotland) Amendment Order 2015 (S.S.I. 2015 No. 133)
- The South West Scotland Trunk Roads (Temporary Prohibitions of Traffic and Overtaking and Temporary Speed Restrictions) (No. 3) Order 2015 (S.S.I. 2015 No. 134)
- The South East Scotland Trunk Roads (Temporary Prohibitions of Traffic and Overtaking and Temporary Speed Restrictions) (No. 3) Order 2015 (S.S.I. 2015 No. 135)
- The North West Scotland Trunk Roads (Temporary Prohibitions of Traffic and Overtaking and Temporary Speed Restrictions) (No. 3) Order 2015 (S.S.I. 2015 No. 136)
- The North East Scotland Trunk Roads (Temporary Prohibitions of Traffic and Overtaking and Temporary Speed Restrictions) (No. 3) Order 2015 (S.S.I. 2015 No. 137)
- The Budget (Scotland) Act 2014 Amendment Order 2015 (S.S.I. 2015 No. 138)
- The Pollution Prevention and Control Act 1999 (Commencement No. 4 and Amendment) (Scotland) Order 2015 (S.S.I. 2015 No. 139 (C. 27))
- The Firemen's Pension Scheme (Amendment) (Scotland) Order 2015 (S.S.I. 2015 No. 140)
- The Firefighters’ Pension Schemes (Amendment) (Scotland) Regulations 2015 (S.S.I. 2015 No. 141)
- The Police Pension Scheme (Scotland) Regulations 2015 (S.S.I. 2015 No. 142)
- The Firefighters’ Compensation Scheme and Pension Scheme (Amendment) (Scotland) Order 2015 (S.S.I. 2015 No. 143)
- The Housing (Scotland) Act 2006 (Repayment Charge and Discharge) Amendment Order 2015 (S.S.I. 2015 No. 144)
- The National Health Service Pension Scheme (Consequential Provisions) (Scotland) Regulations 2015 (S.S.I. 2015 No. 145)
- The Teachers’ Pension Scheme (Consequential Provisions) (Scotland) Regulations 2015 (S.S.I. 2015 No. 146)
- The M8, M74 and A725 Trunk Roads (Newhouse, Raith, Daldowie and Easterhouse to Bargeddie) (Temporary Prohibition on Use of Road and Temporary 30 mph Speed Limit) Order 2015 (S.S.I. 2015 No. 147)
- The Charity Test (Specified Bodies) and the Protection of Charities Assets (Exemption) (Scotland) Amendment Order 2015 (S.S.I. 2015 No. 148)
- The Common Financial Tool etc. (Scotland) Amendment Regulations 2015 (S.S.I. 2015 No. 149)
- The Courts Reform (Scotland) Act 2014 (Consequential Provisions) Order 2015 (S.S.I. 2015 No. 150)
- The Scottish Landfill Tax (Exemption Certificates) Order 2015 (S.S.I. 2015 No. 151)
- The Scottish Landfill Tax (Administration) Amendment Regulations 2015 (S.S.I. 2015 No. 152)
- The Post-16 Education (Scotland) Act 2013 (Modification of Legislation) Order 2015 (S.S.I. 2015 No. 153)
- The Community Care (Personal Care and Nursing Care) (Scotland) Amendment Regulations 2015 (S.S.I. 2015 No. 154)
- The Advice and Assistance (Assistance by Way of Representation) (Scotland) Amendment (No. 2) Regulations 2015 (S.S.I. 2015 No. 155)
- The Aftercare (Eligible Needs) (Scotland) Order 2015 (S.S.I. 2015 No. 156)
- The Public Bodies (Joint Working) (Scotland) Act 2014 (Consequential Modifications and Saving) Order 2015 (S.S.I. 2015 No. 157)
- The Continuing Care (Scotland) Order 2015 (S.S.I. 2015 No. 158)
- The Single Use Carrier Bags Charge (Fixed Penalty Notices and Amendment) (Scotland) Regulations 2015 (S.S.I. 2015 No. 159)
- The National Health Service (Free Prescriptions and Charges for Drugs and Appliances) (Scotland) Amendment Regulations 2015 (S.S.I. 2015 No. 160)
- The Welfare of Animals at the Time of Killing (Scotland) Amendment Regulations 2015 (S.S.I. 2016 No. 161)
- The Certification of Death (Scotland) Act 2011 (Authorisation of Cremation – Death Outwith Scotland) Regulations 2015 (S.S.I. 2016 No. 162)
- The Certification of Death (Scotland) Act 2011 (Application for Review) Regulations 2015 (S.S.I. 2016 No. 163)
- The Certification of Death (Scotland) Act 2011 (Consequential Provisions) Order 2015 (S.S.I. 2016 No. 164)
- The Certification of Death (Scotland) Act 2011 (Post-Mortem Examinations – Death Outwith United Kingdom) Regulations 2015 (S.S.I. 2016 No. 165)
- The Registration of Births, Deaths and Marriages (Scotland) Act 1965 (Prohibition on Disposal of a Body without Authorisation) Regulations 2015 (S.S.I. 2016 No. 166)
- The Common Agricultural Policy Non-IACS Support Schemes (Appeals) (Scotland) Amendment Regulations 2015 (S.S.I. 2016 No. 167)
- The M74 Trunk Road (Polmadie) (Temporary Prohibition on Traffic, Overtaking and Temporary Speed Limit) Order 2015 (S.S.I. 2016 No. 168)
- The M8 (Newhouse to Easterhouse) M73 (Maryville to Mollinsburn) M74 (Daldowie to Hamilton) A725 (Raith to Shawhead) Trunk Roads (Temporary Prohibitions of Traffic and Overtaking and Temporary Speed Restrictions) Order 2015 (S.S.I. 2016 No. 169)
- The South West Scotland Trunk Roads (Temporary Prohibitions of Traffic and Overtaking and Temporary Speed Restrictions) (No. 4) Order 2015 (S.S.I. 2015 No. 170)
- The South East Scotland Trunk Roads (Temporary Prohibitions of Traffic and Overtaking and Temporary Speed Restrictions) (No. 4) Order 2015 (S.S.I. 2017 No. 171)
- The North West Scotland Trunk Roads (Temporary Prohibitions of Traffic and Overtaking and Temporary Speed Restrictions) (No. 4) Order 2015 (S.S.I. 2017 No. 172)
- The Firemen's Pension Scheme (Amendment No. 2) (Scotland) Order 2015 (S.S.I. 2017 No. 173)
- The Police Pensions (Amendment) (Scotland) Regulations 2015 (S.S.I. 2017 No. 174)
- The North East Scotland Trunk Roads (Temporary Prohibitions of Traffic and Overtaking and Temporary Speed Restrictions) (No. 4) Order 2015 (S.S.I. 2017 No. 175)
- Act of Sederunt (Ordinary Cause Rules Amendment) (Proving the Tenor and Reduction) 2015 (S.S.I. 2017 No. 176)
- The Criminal Justice and Licensing (Scotland) Act 2010 (Commencement No. 12) Order 2015 (S.S.I. 2017 No. 177 (C. 28))
- The A83 Trunk Road (Inveraray) (Temporary Prohibition On Use of Road) Order 2015 (S.S.I. 2017 No. 178)
- The Community Care and Health (Scotland) Act 2002 (Commencement No. 4) Order 2015 (S.S.I. 2017 No. 179 (C. 29))
- The Registration of Births, Still-births, Deaths and Marriages (Prescription of Forms) (Scotland) Amendment Regulations 2015 (S.S.I. 2015 No. 180)
- The Town and Country Planning (Hazardous Substances) (Scotland) Regulations 2015 (S.S.I. 2018 No. 181)
- The Town and Country Planning (Hazardous Substances Inquiry Session Procedure) (Scotland) Rules 2015 (S.S.I. 2018 No. 182)
- The Outer Hebrides (Landing of Crabs and Lobsters) Order 2015 (S.S.I. 2018 No. 183)
- The Scottish Tax Tribunals (Time Limits and Rules of Procedure) Regulations 2015 (S.S.I. 2018 No. 184)
- The Less Favoured Area Support Scheme (Scotland) Amendment Regulations 2015 (S.S.I. 2018 No. 185)
- The Bovine Viral Diarrhoea (Scotland) Amendment Order 2015 (S.S.I. 2018 No. 186)
- The Scottish Tax Tribunals (Conduct and Fitness Assessment Tribunal) Rules 2015 (S.S.I. 2018 No. 187)
- The Waste (Meaning of Hazardous Waste and European Waste Catalogue) (Miscellaneous Amendments) (Scotland) Regulations 2015 (S.S.I. 2018 No. 188)
- The Carbon Accounting Scheme (Scotland) Amendment Regulations 2015 (S.S.I. 2018 No. 189)
- The Forth Road Bridge Act 2013 (Commencement) Order 2015 (S.S.I. 2015 No. 190 (C. 30))
- The A82 Trunk Road (Pulpit Rock Improvement) (Temporary Prohibition of Traffic and Overtaking and Speed Restriction) Order 2015 (S.S.I. 2019 No. 191)
- The Rural Development (Scotland) Regulations 2015 (S.S.I. 2019 No. 192)
- The Scottish Marine Regions Order 2015 (S.S.I. 2019 No. 193)
- The Rural Payments (Appeals) (Scotland) Regulations 2015 (S.S.I. 2019 No. 194)
- The A737/A738 Trunk Road (Lochwinnoch) (Temporary 30 mph and 20 mph Speed Restriction) Order 2015 (S.S.I. 2019 No. 195)
- The Historic Environment Scotland Act 2014 (Commencement No. 3) Order 2015 (S.S.I. 2019 No. 196 (C. 31))
- The Climate Change (Additional Greenhouse Gas) (Scotland) Order 2015 (S.S.I. 2019 No. 197)
- The A68 Trunk Road (Fordel Junction, Dalkeith) (Redetermination of Means of Exercise of Public Right of Passage) Order 2015 (S.S.I. 2019 No. 198)
- The Lands Tribunal for Scotland Amendment (Fees) Rules 2015 (S.S.I. 2019 No. 199)
- The Victims and Witnesses (Scotland) Act 2014 (Commencement No. 4 and Transitional Provisions) Order 2015 (S.S.I. 2015 No. 200 (C. 32))

== 201-300 ==
- Act of Adjournal (Criminal Procedure Rules 1996 Amendment) (No. 3) (Miscellaneous) 2015 (S.S.I. 2015 No. 201)
- The Community Care (Provision of Residential Accommodation Outwith Scotland) (Scotland) Regulations 2015 (S.S.I. 2015 No. 202)
- The A77 Trunk Road (Girvan) (30 mph Speed Limit) Order 2015 (S.S.I. 2015 No. 203)
- The South West Scotland Trunk Roads (Temporary Prohibitions of Traffic and Overtaking and Temporary Speed Restrictions) (No. 5) Order 2015 (S.S.I. 2015 No. 204)
- The South East Scotland Trunk Roads (Temporary Prohibitions of Traffic and Overtaking and Temporary Speed Restrictions) (No. 5) Order 2015 (S.S.I. 2015 No. 205)
- The North West Scotland Trunk Roads (Temporary Prohibitions of Traffic and Overtaking and Temporary Speed Restrictions) (No. 5) Order 2015 (S.S.I. 2015 No. 206)
- The North East Scotland Trunk Roads (Temporary Prohibitions of Traffic and Overtaking and Temporary Speed Restrictions) (No. 5) Order 2015 (S.S.I. 2015 No. 207)
- The Honey (Scotland) Regulations 2015 (S.S.I. 2015 No. 208)
- The University of the West of Scotland (Amendment of the University of Paisley (Scotland) Order of Council 1993) Order of Council 2015 (S.S.I. 2015 No. 209)
- The Financial Assistance for Environmental Purposes (Scotland) Order 2015 (S.S.I. 2015 No. 210)
- The Water Environment (River Basin Management Planning etc.) (Miscellaneous Amendments) (Scotland) Regulations 2015 (S.S.I. 2015 No. 211)
- The Education (Student Support) (Miscellaneous Amendments) (Scotland) Regulations 2015 (S.S.I. 2015 No. 212)
- The All-Scotland Sheriff Court (Sheriff Personal Injury Court) Order 2015 (S.S.I. 2015 No. 213)
- The Environmental Liability (Scotland) Amendment Regulations 2015 (S.S.I. 2015 No. 214)
- The Common Agricultural Policy (Direct Payments etc.) (Scotland) Amendment Regulations 2015 (S.S.I. 2015 No. 215)
- The Debt Arrangement Scheme (Scotland) Amendment Regulations 2015 (S.S.I. 2015 No. 216)
- The Property Factors (Registration) (Scotland) Amendment Regulations 2015 (S.S.I. 2015 No. 217)
- The Building (Scotland) Amendment Regulations 2015 (S.S.I. 2015 No. 218)
- The National Health Service (Optical Charges and Payments and General Ophthalmic Services) (Scotland) Amendment Regulations 2015 (S.S.I. 2015 No. 219)
- The Proceeds of Crime Act 2002 (Cash Searches: Constables in Scotland: Code of Practice) Order 2015 (S.S.I. 2015 No. 220)
- The Fochabers Cycle Track (Redetermination of Means of Exercise of Public Right of Passage) Order 2015 (S.S.I. 2015 No. 221)
- The Public Bodies (Joint Working) (Integration Joint Board Establishment) (Scotland) Amendment Order 2015 (S.S.I. 2015 No. 222)
- The Protection of Vulnerable Groups (Scotland) Act 2007 (Fees for Scheme Membership and Disclosure Requests) Amendment Regulations 2015 (S.S.I. 2015 No. 223)
- The Scottish Courts and Tribunals Service (Administrative Support) (Specified Persons) Order 2015 (S.S.I. 2015 No. 224)
- The Scottish Sentencing Council (Procedure for Appointment of Members) Regulations 2015 (S.S.I. 2015 No. 225)
- The Late Payment of Commercial Debts (Scotland) Regulations 2015 (S.S.I. 2015 No. 226)
- Act of Sederunt (Rules of the Court of Session 1994 and Sheriff Court Rules Amendment) (No. 2) (Personal Injury and Remits) 2015 (S.S.I. 2015 No. 227)
- Act of Sederunt (Rules of the Court of Session 1994 Amendment) (No. 3) (Courts Reform (Scotland) Act 2014) 2015 (S.S.I. 2015 No. 228)
- The Scheduled Monument Consent Procedure (Scotland) Regulations 2015 (S.S.I. 2015 No. 229)
- The Scheduled Monuments (Notification and Publication) (Scotland) Regulations 2015 (S.S.I. 2015 No. 230)
- The Scheduled Monuments (Appeals) (Scotland) Regulations 2015 (S.S.I. 2015 No. 231)
- The Scheduled Monuments (Determination of Appeals by Appointed Persons) (Prescribed Classes) (Scotland) Regulations 2015 (S.S.I. 2015 No. 232)
- The Town and Country Planning (Appeals) (Scotland) Amendment Regulations 2015 (S.S.I. 2015 No. 233)
- The Public Services Reform (Scotland) Act 2010 (Part 2 Extension) Order 2015 (S.S.I. 2015 No. 234)
- The Town and Country Planning (General Permitted Development) (Scotland) Amendment Order 2015 (S.S.I. 2015 No. 235)
- The Town and Country Planning (Determination of Appeals by Appointed Persons) (Prescribed Classes) (Scotland) Amendment Regulations 2015 (S.S.I. 2015 No. 236)
- The Town and Country Planning (Historic Environment Scotland) Amendment Regulations 2015 (S.S.I. 2015 No. 237)
- The Historic Environment Scotland (First Planning Period) Order 2015 (S.S.I. 2015 No. 238)
- The Historic Environment Scotland Act 2014 (Saving, Transitional and Consequential Provisions) Order 2015 (S.S.I. 2015 No. 239)
- The Planning (Listed Buildings and Conservation Areas) (Urgent Works to Crown Land) (Scotland) Regulations 2015 (S.S.I. 2015 No. 240)
- The Listed Buildings (Notification and Publication) (Scotland) Regulations 2015 (S.S.I. 2015 No. 241)
- The Legal Writings (Counterparts and Delivery) (Scotland) Act 2015 (Commencement) Order 2015 (S.S.I. 2015 No. 242 (C. 33))
- The Planning (Listed Building Consent and Conservation Area Consent Procedure) (Scotland) Regulations 2015 (S.S.I. 2015 No. 243)
- The Vulnerable Witnesses (Scotland) Act 2004 (Commencement No. 8) Order 2015 (S.S.I. 2015 No. 244 (C. 34))
- Act of Adjournal (Criminal Procedure Rules 1996 Amendment) (No. 4) (Sheriff Appeal Court) 2015 (S.S.I. 2015 No. 245)
- Act of Sederunt (Rules of the Court of Session 1994 and Fees of Solicitors in the Sheriff Court Amendment) (Courts Reform (Scotland) Act 2014) 2015 (S.S.I. 2015 No. 246)
- The Courts Reform (Scotland) Act 2014 (Commencement No. 3, Transitional and Saving Provisions) Order 2015 (S.S.I. 2015 No. 247 (C. 35))
- The St Mary's Music School (Aided Places) (Scotland) Regulations 2015 (S.S.I. 2015 No. 248)
- The Town and Country Planning (Miscellaneous Amendments) (Scotland) Regulations 2015 (S.S.I. 2015 No. 249)
- The Town and Country Planning (Hazardous Substances Inquiry Session Procedure) (Scotland) Amendment Rules 2015 (S.S.I. 2015 No. 250)
- The A90 Trunk Road (Longhaven) (50 mph Speed Limit) (Part-time 20 mph Speed Limit) Order 2015 (S.S.I. 2015 No. 251)
- The Enhanced Enforcement Areas Scheme (Scotland) Regulations 2015 (S.S.I. 2015 No. 252)
- The A68 Trunk Road (Edinburgh Road, Jedburgh) (Temporary Prohibition on Waiting and 30 mph Speed Limit) Order 2015 (S.S.I. 2015 No. 253)
- The Equality Act 2010 (Specific Duties) (Scotland) Amendment Regulations 2015 (S.S.I. 2015 No. 254)
- The A83 Trunk Road (Tarbert to Campbeltown) (Temporary Prohibition On Use of Road) Order 2015 (S.S.I. 2015 No. 255)
- The A83 Trunk Road (Poltalloch Street, Lochgilphead) (Temporary Prohibition On Use of Road) Order 2015 (S.S.I. 2015 No. 256)
- The M80 (Castlecary Interchange) Special Road Scheme 2015 (S.S.I. 2015 No. 257)
- The M80 (Castlecary Interchange) Special Road (Transfer and Side Road) Order 2015 (S.S.I. 2015 No. 258)
- The M9/A9 Trunk Road (T in the Park Event) (Temporary Prohibition of Waiting and Specified Turns and Temporary 50 mph Speed Restriction) Order 2015 (S.S.I. 2015 No. 259)
- The Adults with Incapacity (Public Guardian's Fees) (Scotland) Regulations 2015 (S.S.I. 2015 No. 260)
- The Court of Session etc. Fees Order 2015 (S.S.I. 2015 No. 261)
- The High Court of Justiciary Fees Order 2015 (S.S.I. 2015 No. 262)
- The Justice of the Peace Court Fees (Scotland) Order 2015 (S.S.I. 2015 No. 263)
- The Sheriff Court Fees Order 2015 (S.S.I. 2015 No. 264)
- The Registers of Scotland (Voluntary Registration, Amendment of Fees, etc.) Order 2015 (S.S.I. 2015 No. 265)
- The Public Bodies (Joint Working) (Integration Joint Board Establishment) (Scotland) Amendment (No. 2) Order 2015 (S.S.I. 2015 No. 266)
- The M90/A90 Trunk Road (Maconochie Road, Fraserburgh) (30 mph Speed Limit) Order 2015 (S.S.I. 2015 No. 267)
- The Provision of Early Learning and Childcare (Specified Children) (Scotland) Amendment Order 2015 (S.S.I. 2015 No. 268)
- The Education (School Lunches) (Scotland) Regulations 2015 (S.S.I. 2015 No. 269)
- The Water Environment and Water Services (Scotland) Act 2003 (Modification of Part 1) Regulations 2015 (revoked) (S.S.I. 2015 No. 270)
- The Historic Environment Scotland Act 2014 (Ancillary Provision) Order 2015 (S.S.I. 2015 No. 271)
- The Housing (Scotland) Act 2014 (Commencement No. 3 and Transitional Provision) Order 2015 (S.S.I. 2015 No. 272 (C. 36))
- The A83 Trunk Road (Campbeltown Raft Race) (Temporary Prohibition On Use of Road) Order 2015 (S.S.I. 2015 No. 273)
- The South West Scotland Trunk Roads (Temporary Prohibitions of Traffic and Overtaking and Temporary Speed Restrictions) (No. 6) Order 2015 (S.S.I. 2015 No. 274)
- The South East Scotland Trunk Roads (Temporary Prohibitions of Traffic and Overtaking and Temporary Speed Restrictions) (No. 6) Order 2015 (S.S.I. 2015 No. 275)
- The North West Scotland Trunk Roads (Temporary Prohibitions of Traffic and Overtaking and Temporary Speed Restrictions) (No. 6) Order 2015 (S.S.I. 2015 No. 276)
- The North East Scotland Trunk Roads (Temporary Prohibitions of Traffic and Overtaking and Temporary Speed Restrictions) (No. 6) Order 2015 (S.S.I. 2015 No. 277)
- The A1 Trunk Road (Gladsmuir Junction to Oaktree Junction) (Temporary Prohibition on Use of Road) Order 2015 (S.S.I. 2015 No. 278)
- The Advice and Assistance (Assistance by Way of Representation) (Scotland) Amendment (No. 3) Regulations 2015 (S.S.I. 2015 No. 279)
- The A85 Trunk Road (Drummond Street, Comrie) (Temporary Prohibition on Use of Road) Order 2015 (S.S.I. 2015 No. 280)
- The A96 Trunk Road (Aberdeen Western Peripheral Route, Blackburn to Bucksburn) (Temporary Prohibition of Traffic, Specified Turns, Overtaking and Speed Restrictions) Order 2015 (S.S.I. 2015 No. 281)
- The M74 Trunk Road (Polmadie) (Temporary Prohibition on Traffic, Overtaking and Temporary Speed Limit) (No. 2) Order 2015 (S.S.I. 2015 No. 282)
- Act of Sederunt (Rules of the Court of Session 1994 and Sheriff Court Rules Amendment) (No. 3) (Miscellaneous) 2015 (S.S.I. 2015 No. 283)
- The A90 Trunk Road (Northbound Slip Road from B980 Castlandhill Road) (Temporary Speed Restrictions) Order 2015 (S.S.I. 2015 No. 284)
- The A90 Trunk Road (Northbound Slip Road from B980 Castlandhill Road) (Temporary Prohibition on Use of Road) Order 2015 (S.S.I. 2015 No. 285)
- The Scottish Public Services Ombudsman Act 2002 Amendment Order 2015 (S.S.I. 2015 No. 286)
- The A78 Trunk Road (Branchton Footbridge) (Temporary Prohibition on Use of Road) Order 2015 (S.S.I. 2015 No. 287)
- The South West Scotland Trunk Roads (Temporary Prohibitions of Traffic and Overtaking and Temporary Speed Restrictions) (No. 7) Order 2015 (S.S.I. 2015 No. 288)
- The South East Scotland Trunk Roads (Temporary Prohibitions of Traffic and Overtaking and Temporary Speed Restrictions) (No. 7) Order 2015 (S.S.I. 2015 No. 289)
- The North West Scotland Trunk Roads (Temporary Prohibitions of Traffic and Overtaking and Temporary Speed Restrictions) (No. 7) Order 2015 (S.S.I. 2015 No. 290)
- The North East Scotland Trunk Roads (Temporary Prohibitions of Traffic and Overtaking and Temporary Speed Restrictions) (No. 7) Order 2015 (S.S.I. 2015 No. 291)
- The A90 Trunk Road (Northbound Slip Road from B980 Castlandhill Road) (Temporary Prohibition on Use of Road) Order 2015 (S.S.I. 2015 No. 292)
- The A85 Trunk Road (Laggan Park to Bridge Street, Comrie) (Temporary Prohibition on Use of Road) Order 2015 (S.S.I. 2015 No. 293)
- The A96 Trunk Road (Moss Street, Keith) (Temporary Prohibition On Use of Road) Order 2015 (S.S.I. 2015 No. 294)
- Act of Adjournal (Criminal Procedure Rules 1996 and Act of Adjournal (Criminal Procedure Rules 1996 Amendment) (No. 4) (Sheriff Appeal Court) 2015 Amendment) (Miscellaneous) 2015 (S.S.I. 2015 No. 295)
- Act of Sederunt (Ordinary Cause Rules 1993 Amendment and Miscellaneous Amendments) 2015 (S.S.I. 2015 No. 296)
- Not Allocated (S.S.I. 2015 No. 297)
- The Peterhead Port Authority Harbour Revision Order 2015 (S.S.I. 2015 No. 298)
- The A85 Trunk Road (Perth Road to James Square, Crieff) (Temporary Prohibition on Use of Road) Order 2015 (S.S.I. 2015 No. 299)
- The A9 Trunk Road (Kincraig to Dalraddy Dualling) (Temporary 40 mph Speed Restriction) Order 2015 (S.S.I. 2015 No. 300)

== 301-400 ==
- The A830 Trunk Road (Blar Mhor and Lochaber High School) (30 mph, 40 mph and Part-time 20 mph Speed Limit) Order 2015 (S.S.I. 2015 No. 301)
- The Wester Ross Marine Conservation Order 2015 (S.S.I. 2015 No. 302)
- The South Arran Marine Conservation Order 2014 (Urgent Continuation) Order 2015 (S.S.I. 2015 No. 303)
- The M90/A90 Trunk Road (A937 Marykirk Junction) (Temporary Prohibition of Specified Turns) Order 2015 (S.S.I. 2015 No. 304)
- The Queen Margaret University, Edinburgh (Scotland) Amendment Order of Council 2015 (S.S.I. 2015 No. 305)
- The South West Scotland Trunk Roads (Temporary Prohibitions of Traffic and Overtaking and Temporary Speed Restrictions) (No. 8) Order 2015 (S.S.I. 2015 No. 306)
- The North West Scotland Trunk Roads (Temporary Prohibitions of Traffic and Overtaking and Temporary Speed Restrictions) (No. 8) Order 2015 (S.S.I. 2015 No. 307)
- The North East Scotland Trunk Roads (Temporary Prohibitions of Traffic and Overtaking and Temporary Speed Restrictions) (No. 8) Order 2015 (S.S.I. 2015 No. 308)
- The South East Scotland Trunk Roads (Temporary Prohibitions of Traffic and Overtaking and Temporary Speed Restrictions) (No. 8) Order 2015 (S.S.I. 2015 No. 309)
- The A90 and A96 Trunk Roads (Aberdeen Western Peripheral Route/Balmedie to Tipperty) (Stonehaven Bypass, Portlethen, Murcar to South Ellon and Blackburn to Bucksburn) (Temporary Prohibition of Traffic, Specified Turns, Overtaking and Speed Restrictions) Order 2015 (S.S.I. 2015 No. 310)
- The A701 Trunk Road (Amisfield) (50 mph Speed Limit) Order 2015 (S.S.I. 2015 No. 311)
- Act of Sederunt (Rules of the Court of Session 1994 and Ordinary Cause Rules 1993 Amendment) (Child Welfare Reporters) 2015 (S.S.I. 2015 No. 312)
- The Marriage (Prescription of Forms) (Scotland) Amendment Regulations 2015 (S.S.I. 2015 No. 313)
- The Reservoirs (Scotland) Act 2011 (Commencement No. 4) Order 2015 (S.S.I. 2015 No. 314 (C. 37))
- The Reservoirs (Scotland) Amendment Regulations 2015 (S.S.I. 2015 No. 315)
- The A96 Trunk Road (High Street, Elgin) (Temporary Prohibition on Use of Road) Order 2015 (S.S.I. 2015 No. 316)
- The Children and Young People (Scotland) Act 2014 (Commencement No. 9 and Saving Provision) Order 2015 (S.S.I. 2015 No. 317 (C. 38))
- The Education (Assisted Places) (Scotland) Revocation Regulations 2015 (S.S.I. 2015 No. 318)
- The Self-directed Support (Direct Payments) (Scotland) Amendment Regulations 2015 (S.S.I. 2015 No. 319)
- The Sea Fishing (EU Control Measures) (Scotland) Order 2015 (S.S.I. 2015 No. 320)
- The Public Bodies (Joint Working) (Integration Joint Board Establishment) (Scotland) Amendment (No. 3) Order 2015 (S.S.I. 2015 No. 321)
- The Land and Buildings Transaction Tax (Open-ended Investment Companies) (Scotland) Regulations 2015 (S.S.I. 2015 No. 322)
- The Water Environment (Relevant Enactments and Designation of Responsible Authorities and Functions) (Scotland) Amendment Order 2015 (S.S.I. 2015 No. 323)
- The Discontinuance of Legalised Police Cells (Scotland) Rules 2015 (S.S.I. 2015 No. 324)
- The Police Pension Scheme (Scotland) Amendment Regulations 2015 (S.S.I. 2015 No. 325)
- The Private Rented Housing (Scotland) Act 2011 (Commencement No. 7) Order 2015 (S.S.I. 2015 No. 326 (C. 39))
- The Tuberculosis in Specified Animals (Scotland) Order 2015 (S.S.I. 2015 No. 327)
- The Scheduled Monuments and Listed Buildings (Miscellaneous Amendments) (Scotland) Regulations 2015 (S.S.I. 2015 No. 328)
- The Rehabilitation of Offenders Act 1974 (Exclusions and Exceptions) (Scotland) Amendment Order 2015 (S.S.I. 2015 No. 329)
- The Police Act 1997 and the Protection of Vulnerable Groups (Scotland) Act 2007 Remedial Order 2015 (S.S.I. 2015 No. 330)
- The Procurement Reform (Scotland) Act 2014 (Commencement No. 1) Order 2015 (S.S.I. 2015 No. 331 (C. 40))
- The A77 Trunk Road (Maybole) (30 mph, 20 mph and Part-time 20 mph Speed Limit) Order 2015 (S.S.I. 2015 No. 332)
- The National Health Service (Payments and Remission of Charges) (Miscellaneous Amendments) (Scotland) Regulations 2015 (S.S.I. 2015 No. 333)
- The Mental Health Tribunal for Scotland (Practice and Procedure) (No. 2) Amendment Rules 2015 (S.S.I. 2015 No. 334)
- The Public Records (Scotland) Act 2011 (Authorities) Amendment Order 2015 (S.S.I. 2015 No. 335)
- The Criminal Justice and Licensing (Scotland) Act 2010 (Commencement No. 13) and the Courts Reform (Scotland) Act 2014 (Commencement No. 4) Order 2015 (S.S.I. 2015 No. 336 (C. 41))
- The Legal Aid (Miscellaneous Amendments) (Scotland) Regulations 2015 (S.S.I. 2015 No. 337)
- The Courts Reform (Scotland) Act 2014 (Consequential Provisions No. 2) Order 2015 (S.S.I. 2015 No. 338)
- The South East Scotland Trunk Roads (Temporary Prohibitions of Traffic and Overtaking and Temporary Speed Restrictions) (No. 9) Order 2015 (S.S.I. 2015 No. 339)
- The South West Scotland Trunk Roads (Temporary Prohibitions of Traffic and Overtaking and Temporary Speed Restrictions) (No. 9) Order 2015 (S.S.I. 2015 No. 340)
- The North East Scotland Trunk Roads (Temporary Prohibitions of Traffic and Overtaking and Temporary Speed Restrictions) (No. 9) Order 2015 (S.S.I. 2015 No. 341)
- The North West Scotland Trunk Roads (Temporary Prohibitions of Traffic and Overtaking and Temporary Speed Restrictions) (No. 9) Order 2015 (S.S.I. 2015 No. 342)
- The A9 Trunk Road (Kincraig to Dalraddy Dualling) (Temporary Prohibition of Traffic and Overtaking) Order 2015 (S.S.I. 2015 No. 343)
- The Community Empowerment (Scotland) Act 2015 (Commencement No. 1) Order 2015 (S.S.I. 2015 No. 344 (C. 42))
- The A68 Trunk Road (St Boswells) (50 mph Speed Limit) Order 2015 (S.S.I. 2015 No. 345)
- The Private and Public Water Supplies (Miscellaneous Amendments) (Scotland) Regulations 2015 (S.S.I. 2015 No. 346)
- The Climate Change (Duties of Public Bodies: Reporting Requirements) (Scotland) Order 2015 (S.S.I. 2015 No. 347)
- The Glasgow Clyde College (Removal and Appointment of board members) (Scotland) Order 2015 (S.S.I. 2015 No. 348)
- The Housing (Scotland) Act 2014 (Commencement No. 4 and Amendment) Order 2015 (S.S.I. 2015 No. 349 (C. 43))
- The Scottish Parliament (Disqualification) Order 2015 (S.S.I. 2015 No. 350)
- Act of Sederunt (Child Support Rules Amendment) (Miscellaneous) 2015 (S.S.I. 2015 No. 351)
- The South West Scotland Trunk Roads (Temporary Prohibitions of Traffic and Overtaking and Temporary Speed Restrictions) (No. 10) Order 2015 (S.S.I. 2015 No. 352)
- The North East Scotland Trunk Roads (Temporary Prohibitions of Traffic and Overtaking and Temporary Speed Restrictions) (No. 10) Order 2015 (S.S.I. 2015 No. 353)
- The South East Scotland Trunk Roads (Temporary Prohibitions of Traffic and Overtaking and Temporary Speed Restrictions) (No. 10) Order 2015 (S.S.I. 2015 No. 354)
- The North West Scotland Trunk Roads (Temporary Prohibitions of Traffic and Overtaking and Temporary Speed Restrictions) (No. 10) Order 2015 (S.S.I. 2015 No. 355)
- Act of Sederunt (Sheriff Appeal Court Rules) 2015 (S.S.I. 2015 No. 356)
- The M9/A9 Trunk Road (Crubenmore and Etteridge) (Temporary Prohibition of Specified Turns) Order 2015 (S.S.I. 2015 No. 357)
- The Community Empowerment (Scotland) Act 2015 (Commencement No. 2) Order 2015 (S.S.I. 2015 No. 358 (C. 44))
- The European Maritime and Fisheries Fund (Grants) (Scotland) Regulations 2015 (S.S.I. 2015 No. 359)
- The Water Act 2014 (Commencement No. 1) (Scotland) Order 2015 (S.S.I. 2015 No. 360 (C. 45))
- The Mental Health (Scotland) Act 2015 (Commencement No. 1, Transitional and Saving Provisions) Order 2015 (S.S.I. 2015 No. 361 (C. 46))
- The A84 Trunk Road (Callander) (Temporary Prohibition On Use of Road) Order 2015 (S.S.I. 2015 No. 362)
- The Natural Mineral Water, Spring Water and Bottled Drinking Water (Scotland) Amendment Regulations 2015 (S.S.I. 2015 No. 363)
- The Mental Health (Detention in Conditions of Excessive Security) (Scotland) Regulations 2015 (S.S.I. 2015 No. 364)
- The A85 Trunk Road (Lochearnhead to Lix Toll) (50 mph Speed Limit) Order 2015 (S.S.I. 2015 No. 365)
- The A83 Trunk Road (Poltalloch Street, Lochgilphead) (Temporary Prohibition On Use of Road) (No. 2) Order 2015 (S.S.I. 2015 No. 366)
- The A83 Trunk Road (Poltalloch Street and Lochnell Street, Lochgilphead) (Temporary Prohibition On Use of Road) Order 2015 (S.S.I. 2015 No. 367)
- The Scottish Independence Referendum (Chief Counting Officer and Counting Officer Charges and Expenses) Order 2015 (S.S.I. 2015 No. 368)
- The Private Rented Housing Panel (Tenant and Third Party Applications) (Scotland) Regulations 2015 (S.S.I. 2015 No. 369)
- The Diligence against Earnings (Variation) (Scotland) Regulations 2015 (S.S.I. 2015 No. 370)
- The Qualifying Civil Partnership Modification (Scotland) Order 2015 (S.S.I. 2015 No. 371)
- The A78 Trunk Road (Gallowgate Street, Largs) (Temporary Traffic Restrictions) Order 2015 (S.S.I. 2015 No. 372)
- The A1 Trunk Road (Gladsmuir Junction to Oaktree Junction) (Temporary Prohibition on Use of Road) (No. 2) Order 2015 (S.S.I. 2015 No. 373)
- The A96 Trunk Road (Church Road, Keith) (Temporary Prohibition on Use of Road) Order 2015 (S.S.I. 2015 No. 374)
- Act of Adjournal (Criminal Procedure Rules 1996 Amendment) (No. 5) (Request for Final Decision and Reasons) 2015 (S.S.I. 2015 No. 375)
- The Designation of Nitrate Vulnerable Zones (Scotland) Regulations 2015 (S.S.I. 2015 No. 376)
- The Snares (Training) (Scotland) Order 2015 (S.S.I. 2015 No. 377)
- The Courts Reform (Scotland) Act 2014 (Commencement No. 5, Transitional and Saving Provisions) Order 2015 (S.S.I. 2015 No. 378 (C. 47))
- The Sheriff Appeal Court Fees Order 2015 (S.S.I. 2015 No. 379)
- The Civil Legal Aid (Scotland) (Miscellaneous Amendments) Regulations 2015 (S.S.I. 2015 No. 380)
- The Scottish Tribunals (Eligibility for Appointment) Regulations 2015 (S.S.I. 2015 No. 381)
- The Air Weapons and Licensing (Scotland) Act 2015 (Commencement No. 1) Order 2015 (S.S.I. 2015 No. 382 (C. 48))
- The Environmental Regulation (Enforcement Measures) (Scotland) Order 2015 (S.S.I. 2015 No. 383)
- The Renewables Obligation (Scotland) Amendment Order 2015( S.S.I. 2015 No. 384)
- The A77 Trunk Road (Dalrymple Street, Girvan) (Temporary Prohibition On Use of Road) Order 2015 (S.S.I. 2015 No. 385)
- The Energy Performance of Buildings (Scotland) Amendment Regulations 2015 (S.S.I. 2015 No. 386)
- Act of Sederunt (Fees of Solicitors in the Sheriff Appeal Court) 2015 (S.S.I. 2015 No. 387)
- The Criminal Justice and Licensing (Scotland) Act 2010 (Supplementary Provision) Order 2015 (S.S.I. 2015 No. 388)
- The South East Scotland Trunk Roads (Temporary Prohibitions of Traffic and Overtaking and Temporary Speed Restrictions) (No. 11) Order 2015 (S.S.I. 2015 No. 389)
- The North West Scotland Trunk Roads (Temporary Prohibitions of Traffic and Overtaking and Temporary Speed Restrictions) (No. 11) Order 2015 (S.S.I. 2015 No. 390)
- The South West Scotland Trunk Roads (Temporary Prohibitions of Traffic and Overtaking and Temporary Speed Restrictions) (No. 11) Order 2015 (S.S.I. 2015 No. 391)
- The Plant Health (Import Inspection Fees) (Scotland) Amendment Regulations 2015 (S.S.I. 2015 No. 392)
- The Animal By-Products (Miscellaneous Amendments) (Scotland) Regulations 2015 (S.S.I. 2015 No. 393)
- The North East Scotland Trunk Roads (Temporary Prohibitions of Traffic and Overtaking and Temporary Speed Restrictions) (No. 11) Order 2015 (S.S.I. 2015 No. 394)
- The Seed Potatoes (Scotland) Regulations 2015

(S.S.I. 2015 No. 395)

- The Seed Potatoes (Fees) (Scotland) Regulations 2015 (S.S.I. 2015 No. 396)
- Not Allocated (S.S.I. 2015 No. 397)
- The Litigants in Person (Costs and Expenses) (Sheriff Appeal Court) Order 2015 (S.S.I. 2015 No. 398)
- The Community Empowerment (Scotland) Act 2015 (Commencement No. 3 and Savings) Order 2015 (S.S.I. 2015 No. 399 (C. 50))
- The Community Right to Buy (Scotland) Regulations 2015 (S.S.I. 2015 No. 400)

=== 401-450 ===
- The Trade in Animals and Related Products (Scotland) Amendment Regulations 2015 (S.S.I. 2015 No. 401)
- The Courts Reform (Scotland) Act 2014 (Consequential and Supplemental Provisions) Order 2015 (S.S.I. 2015 No. 402)
- The Private Rented Housing Panel (Landlord Applications) (Scotland) Regulations 2015 (S.S.I. 2015 No. 403)
- The Scottish Tribunals (Listed Tribunals) Regulations 2015 (S.S.I. 2015 No. 404)
- The Scottish Tribunals (Administrative Support for Listed Tribunals) Order 2015 (S.S.I. 2015 No. 405)
- The Children and Young People (Scotland) Act 2014 (Commencement No. 10 and Saving Provision) Order 2015 (S.S.I. 2015 No. 406 (C. 51))
- The A68 Trunk Road (Lauder) (Temporary Prohibition On Use Of Road) Order 2015 (S.S.I. 2015 No. 407)
- Act of Sederunt (Rules of the Court of Session 1994 Amendment) (No. 4) (Protective Expenses Orders) 2015 (S.S.I. 2015 No. 408)
- The Prisoners (Control of Release) (Scotland) Act 2015 (Commencement) Order 2015 (S.S.I. 2015 No. 409 (C. 52))
- The Food Information (Miscellaneous Amendments) (Scotland) Regulations 2015 (S.S.I. 2015 No. 410)
- The Procurement Reform (Scotland) Act 2014 (Commencement No. 2) Order 2015 (S.S.I. 2015 No. 411 (C. 53))
- The A737/A738 Trunk Road (Dalry Bypass) (Side Roads) Order 2015 (S.S.I. 2015 No. 412)
- The A737/A738 Trunk Road (Dalry Bypass) (Trunking and Detrunking) Order 2015 (S.S.I. 2015 No. 413)
- The A737/A738 Trunk Road (The Den, Dalry) (Side Roads) Order 2015 (S.S.I. 2015 No. 414)
- The A737/A738 Trunk Road (The Den, Dalry) (Trunking and Detrunking) Order 2015 (S.S.I. 2015 No. 415)
- The A96 Trunk Road (Inveramsay Bridge Improvement) (Temporary Prohibitions on Traffic, Overtaking and Temporary Speed Restriction) (No. 2) Order 2015 (S.S.I. 2015 No. 416)
- The Mental Health (Scotland) Act 2015 (Commencement No. 2) Order 2015 (S.S.I. 2015 No. 417 (C. 54))
- The A985 Trunk Road (Longannet Roundabout to Cairneyhill Roundabout) (Temporary Prohibition on Use of Road) Order 2015 (S.S.I. 2015 No. 418)
- Act of Sederunt (Rules of the Court of Session, Sheriff Appeal Court Rules and Sheriff Court Rules Amendment) (Sheriff Appeal Court) 2015( S.S.I. 2015 No. 419)
- The Public Service Vehicles (Registration of Local Services) (Scotland) Amendment Regulations 2015 (S.S.I. 2015 No. 420)
- The International Organisations (Immunities and Privileges) (Scotland) Amendment Order 2015 (S.S.I. 2015 No. 421)
- The Tribunals (Scotland) Act 2014 (Commencement No. 3) Order 2015 (S.S.I. 2015 No. 422 (C. 55))
- The Police Act 1997 and the Protection of Vulnerable Groups (Scotland) Act 2007 Remedial (No. 2) Order 2015 (S.S.I. 2015 No. 423)
- Act of Sederunt (Sheriff Court Rules Amendment) (Miscellaneous) 2015 (S.S.I. 2015 No. 424)
- The Scottish Parliament (Elections etc.) Order 2015 (S.S.I. 2015 No. 425)
- The A985 Trunk Road (Longannet Roundabout to Cairneyhill Roundabout) (Temporary Prohibition on Use of Road) No. 2 Order 2015 (S.S.I. 2015 No. 426)
- The A84 Trunk Road (Balquhidder Station) (50 mph Speed Limit) Order 2015 (S.S.I. 2015 No. 427)
- The Welfare Funds (Scotland) Act 2015 (Commencement) Order 2015 (S.S.I. 2015 No. 428 (C. 56))
- The Management of Offenders etc. (Scotland) Act 2005 (Commencement No. 8) Order 2015 (S.S.I. 2015 No. 429 (C. 57))
- The Housing (Scotland) Act 2014 (Commencement No. 5 and Consequential Provision) Order 2015 (S.S.I. 2015 No. 430 (C. 58))
- The Management of Offenders etc. (Scotland) Act 2005 (Specification of Persons) Amendment Order 2015 (S.S.I. 2015 No. 431)
- The Public Bodies (Joint Working) (Integration Joint Boards and Integration Joint Monitoring Committees) (Scotland) Amendment (No. 2) Order 2015 (S.S.I. 2015 No. 432)
- The Food (Scotland) Act 2015 (Consequential Provisions) (No. 2) Order 2015 (S.S.I. 2015 No. 433)
- The Budget (Scotland) Act 2015 Amendment Regulations 2015 (S.S.I. 2015 No. 434)
- The Inshore Fishing (Prohibition of Fishing and Fishing Methods) (Scotland) Order 2015 (S.S.I. 2015 No. 435)
- The Inshore Fishing (Prohibited Methods of Fishing) (Luce Bay) Order 2015 (S.S.I. 2015 No. 436)
- The South Arran Marine Conservation Order 2015 (S.S.I. 2015 No. 437)
- The Waste (Meaning of Recovery) (Miscellaneous Amendments) (Scotland) Order 2015 (S.S.I. 2015 No. 438)
- The South West Scotland Trunk Roads (Temporary Prohibitions of Traffic and Overtaking and Temporary Speed Restrictions) (No. 12) Order 2015 (S.S.I. 2015 No. 439)
- The South East Scotland Trunk Roads (Temporary Prohibitions of Traffic and Overtaking and Temporary Speed Restrictions) (No. 12) Order 2015 (S.S.I. 2015 No. 440)
- The North West Scotland Trunk Roads (Temporary Prohibitions of Traffic and Overtaking and Temporary Speed Restrictions) (No. 12) Order 2015 (S.S.I. 2015 No. 441)
- The North East Scotland Trunk Roads (Temporary Prohibitions of Traffic and Overtaking and Temporary Speed Restrictions) (No. 12) Order 2015 (S.S.I. 2015 No. 442)
- Act of Adjournal (Criminal Procedure Rules 1996 Amendment) (No. 6) (Special Measures in the Justice of the Peace Court) 2015 (S.S.I. 2015 No. 443)
- The Victims’ Rights (Scotland) Regulations 2015 (S.S.I. 2015 No. 444)
- The A702 Trunk Road (Biggar) (Temporary Prohibition on Use of Road) Order 2015 (S.S.I. 2015 No. 445)
- The Public Contracts (Scotland) Regulations 2015 (S.S.I. 2015 No. 446)
- The Justice of the Peace Courts (Special Measures) (Scotland) Order 2015 (S.S.I. 2015 No. 447)
- The Local Government Pension Scheme (Scotland) Amendment (No. 2) Regulations 2015 (S.S.I. 2015 No. 448)
- The A75 Trunk Road (London Road, Stranraer) (Temporary Prohibition on Use of Road) Order 2015 (S.S.I. 2015 No. 449)
- The A82 Trunk Road (Glen Etive) (Temporary Prohibition of Traffic) Order 2015 (S.S.I. 2015 No. 450)
