= List of Scottish statutory instruments, 2021 =

This is a complete list of Scottish statutory instruments in 2021.

== 1-100 ==
- The Health Protection (Coronavirus) (Restrictions and Requirements) (Local Levels) (Scotland) Amendment (No. 10) Regulations 2021 (S.S.I 2021 No. 1)
- The A82 Trunk Road (Drumnadrochit to Fort Augustus) (Temporary Prohibition on Use of Road) Order 2021 (S.S.I 2021 No. 2)
- The Health Protection (Coronavirus) (Restrictions and Requirements) (Local Levels) (Scotland) Amendment (No. 11) Regulations 2021 (S.S.I 2021 No. 3)
- The Parole Board (Scotland) Amendment Rules 2021 (S.S.I 2021 No. 4)
- The Health Protection (Coronavirus) (International Travel) (Scotland) Amendment Regulations 2021 (revoked) (S.S.I 2021 No. 5)
- The Health Protection (Coronavirus) (International Travel) (Scotland) Amendment (No. 2) Regulations 2021 (revoked) (S.S.I 2021 No. 6)
- The Health Protection (Coronavirus) (International Travel) (Scotland) Amendment (No. 3) Regulations 2021 (revoked) (S.S.I 2021 No. 7)
- The Repayment of Student Loans (Scotland) Amendment Regulations 2021 (S.S.I 2021 No. 8)
- The Common Agricultural Policy (Simplifications and Improvements) (Miscellaneous Amendments) (Scotland) Regulations 2021 (S.S.I 2021 No. 9)
- The Homeless Persons (Unsuitable Accommodation) (Scotland) (Modification and Revocation) (Coronavirus) Order 2021 (S.S.I 2021 No. 10)
- The A9 Trunk Road (Tain) (50 mph Speed Limit) Order 2021 (S.S.I 2021 No. 11)
- The Council Tax Reduction (Scotland) Amendment (Coronavirus) Regulations 2021 (S.S.I 2021 No. 12)
- Not Allocated (S.S.I 2021 No. 13)
- The Fireworks (Scotland) Amendment Regulations 2021 (revoked) (S.S.I 2021 No. 14)
- Not Allocated (S.S.I 2021 No. 15)
- The Scottish Child Payment Amendment Regulations 2021 (S.S.I 2021 No. 16)
- The Health Protection (Coronavirus) (Restrictions and Requirements) (Local Levels) (Scotland) Amendment (No. 12) Regulations 2021 (S.S.I 2021 No. 17)
- The Local Governance (Scotland) Act 2004 (Remuneration) Amendment Regulations 2021 (S.S.I 2021 No. 18)
- The Health Protection (Coronavirus) (International Travel) (Scotland) Amendment (No. 4) Regulations 2021 (revoked) (S.S.I 2021 No. 19)
- The Health Protection (Coronavirus) (Pre-Departure Testing and Operator Liability) (Scotland) Regulations 2021 (revoked) (S.S.I 2021 No. 20)
- The Health Protection (Coronavirus) (International Travel) (Scotland) Amendment (No. 5) Regulations 2021 (revoked) (S.S.I 2021 No. 21)
- Act of Sederunt (Rules of the Court of Session 1994 Amendment) (Miscellaneous) 2021 (S.S.I 2021 No. 22)
- The Civil Partnership (Scotland) Act 2020 (Commencement No. 3, Saving and Transitional Provision) Regulations 2021 (S.S.I 2021 No. 23 (C. 1))
- The Civil Partnership Between Persons of Different Sexes (Prescribed Bodies) (Scotland) Regulations 2021 (S.S.I 2021 No. 24)
- The Health Protection (Coronavirus) (Restrictions and Requirements) (Local Levels) (Scotland) Amendment (No. 13) Regulations 2021 (S.S.I 2021 No. 25)
- The Low Emission Zones (Scotland) Regulations 2021 (S.S.I 2021 No. 26)
- The Crofting Community Right to Buy (Procedure, Ballots and Forms) (Scotland) Amendment Regulations 2021 (S.S.I 2021 No. 27)
- The Education (Fees and Student Support) (EU Exit) (Scotland) (Amendment) Regulations 2021 (S.S.I 2021 No. 28)
- The Town and Country Planning (General Permitted Development) (Coronavirus) (Scotland) Amendment Order 2021 (S.S.I 2021 No. 29)
- The Special Restrictions on Adoptions from Nigeria (Scotland) Order 2021 (S.S.I 2021 No. 30)
- The Education (Miscellaneous Amendments) (Coronavirus) (Scotland) Regulations 2021 (S.S.I 2021 No. 31)
- The A78 Trunk Road (Largs) (Temporary Prohibition on Use, Waiting, Loading and Unloading) Order 2021 (S.S.I 2021 No. 32)
- The Rural Development (Miscellaneous Amendment) (Scotland) Regulations 2021 (S.S.I 2021 No. 33)
- The Health Protection (Coronavirus) (International Travel, Public Health Information and Pre-Departure Testing) (Scotland) Amendment Regulations 2021 (revoked) (S.S.I 2021 No. 34)
- The Health Protection (Coronavirus) (Restrictions and Requirements) (Local Levels) (Scotland) Amendment (No. 14) Regulations 2021 (S.S.I 2021 No. 35)
- The North East Scotland Trunk Roads (Temporary Prohibitions of Traffic and Overtaking and Temporary Speed Restrictions) Order 2021 (S.S.I 2021 No. 36)
- The North West Scotland Trunk Roads (Temporary Prohibitions of Traffic and Overtaking and Temporary Speed Restrictions) Order 2021 (S.S.I 2021 No. 37)
- The South West Scotland Trunk Roads (Temporary Prohibitions of Traffic and Overtaking and Temporary Speed Restrictions) Order 2021 (S.S.I 2021 No. 38)
- The Victims and Witnesses (Scotland) Act 2014 (Commencement No. 8) Order 2021 (S.S.I 2021 No. 39 (C. 2))
- The Restorative Justice (Prescribed Persons) (Scotland) Order 2021 (S.S.I 2021 No. 40)
- The South East Scotland Trunk Roads (Temporary Prohibitions of Traffic and Overtaking and Temporary Speed Restrictions) Order 2021 (S.S.I

2021 No. 41)

- The Animals and Wildlife (Penalties, Protections and Powers) (Scotland) Act 2020 (Commencement No. 2) Regulations 2021 (S.S.I 2021 No. 42 (C. 3))
- The M8 and M9 Trunk Roads (Newbridge to Hermiston Gait) (Actively Managed Hard Shoulder and Speed Limit) Regulations 2021 (S.S.I 2021 No. 43)
- The Forestry and Land Management (Scotland) Act 2018 (Consequential, Saving and Transitional Provisions) Regulations 2021 (S.S.I 2021 No. 44)
- The M8 (Newhouse to Easterhouse) M73 (Maryville to Mollinsburn) M74 (Daldowie to Hamilton) A725 (Shawhead to Whistleberry) Trunk Roads (Temporary Prohibitions of Traffic and Overtaking and Temporary Speed Restrictions) Order 2021 (S.S.I 2021 No. 45)
- The Housing (Scotland) Act 1987 (Tolerable Standard) (Extension of Criteria) Amendment Order 2021 S.S.I 2021 No. 46)
- The Housing (Scotland) Act 2006 (Modification of the Repairing Standard) Amendment Regulations 2021 (S.S.I 2021 No. 47)
- The Scottish Road Works Register (Prescribed Fees) Regulations 2021 (revoked) (S.S.I 2021 No. 48)
- The Health Protection (Coronavirus) (Restrictions and Requirements) (Miscellaneous Amendment) (Scotland) Regulations 2021 (S.S.I 2021 No. 49)
- The Personal Protective Equipment (Temporary Arrangements) (Coronavirus) (Scotland) Regulations 2021 (S.S.I 2021 No. 50)
- The Council Tax Reduction (Scotland) Amendment (No. 2) Regulations 2021 (S.S.I 2021 No. 51)
- The Health Protection (Coronavirus) (International Travel, Prohibition on Travel from the United Arab Emirates) (Scotland) Amendment Regulations 2021 (revoked) (S.S.I 2021 No. 52)
- The Single Use Carrier Bags Charge (Coronavirus) (Scotland) Amendment Regulations 2021 (S.S.I 2021 No. 53)
- The Health Protection (Coronavirus) (Restrictions and Requirements) (Local Levels) (Scotland) Amendment (No. 15) Regulations 2021 (S.S.I 2021 No. 54)
- The Criminal Legal Aid and Advice and Assistance (Counter-Terrorism and Border Security) (Scotland) Regulations 2021 (S.S.I 2021 No. 55)
- The Legal Aid and Advice and Assistance (Miscellaneous Amendment) (Scotland) Regulations 2021 (S.S.I 2021 No. 56)
- The Victims and Witnesses (Scotland) Act 2014 (Supplementary Provisions) Order 2021 (S.S.I 2021 No. 57)
- The Restitution Fund (Scotland) Order 2021 (S.S.I 2021 No. 58)
- The Non-Domestic Rating (Valuation of Utilities) (Scotland) Amendment Order 2021 (S.S.I 2021 No. 59)
- The Personal Injuries (NHS Charges) (Amounts) (Scotland) Amendment Regulations 2021 (S.S.I 2021 No. 60)
- The A9 Trunk Road (Tomatin to Moy) (Side Roads) Order 2021 (S.S.I 2021 No. 61)
- The A9 Trunk Road (Tomatin to Moy) (Trunking) Order 2021 (S.S.I 2021 No. 62)
- The Non-Domestic Rate (Scotland) Order 2021 (S.S.I 2021 No. 63)
- The Non-Domestic Rates (District Heating Relief and Renewable Energy Generation Relief) (Scotland) Amendment Regulations 2021 (S.S.I 2021 No. 64)
- The Non-Domestic Rates (Levying and Miscellaneous Amendments) (Scotland) Regulations 2021 (S.S.I 2021 No. 65)
- The Food, Natural Mineral Water, Spring Water and Bottled Drinking Water (EU Exit) (Scotland) (Amendment) Regulations 2021 (S.S.I 2021 No. 66)
- The Provision of Early Learning and Childcare (Specified Children) (Scotland) Amendment Order 2021 (S.S.I 2021 No. 67)
- The Children’s Hearings (Scotland) Act 2011 (Rules of Procedure in Children’s Hearings) Amendment Rules 2021 (S.S.I 2021 No. 68)
- The International Organisations (Immunities and Privileges) (Scotland) Revocation Order 2021 (S.S.I 2021 No. 69)
- (S.S.I 2021 No. 70)
- The Police Act 1997 and the Protection of Vulnerable Groups (Scotland) Act 2007 (Fees) (Coronavirus) Amendment Regulations 2021 (S.S.I 2021 No. 71)
- The Rural Support (Controls) (Coronavirus) (Scotland) Regulations 2021 (S.S.I 2021 No. 72)
- The Disability Assistance for Children and Young People (Consequential Amendment and Transitional Provision) (Scotland) Regulations 2021 (S.S.I 2021 No. 73)
- The Health Protection (Coronavirus) (International Travel) (Managed Accommodation and Testing) (Scotland) Regulations 2021 (revoked) (S.S.I 2021 No. 74)
- Act of Sederunt (Rules of the Court of Session 1994 and Sheriff Court Rules Amendment) (Miscellaneous) 2021 (S.S.I 2021 No. 75)
- The National Assistance (Sums for Personal Requirements) (Scotland) Regulations 2021 (revoked) (S.S.I 2021 No. 76)
- The National Assistance (Assessment of Resources) Amendment (Scotland) Regulations 2021 (revoked) (S.S.I 2021 No. 77)
- The A84/A85 Trunk Road (Callander) (Temporary Prohibition on Use of Road, Waiting, Loading and Unloading and Temporary Speed Restrictions) Order 2021 (S.S.I 2021 No. 78)
- The Fireworks (Scotland) Miscellaneous Amendments Regulations 2021 (S.S.I 2021 No. 79)
- The Prisons and Young Offenders Institutions (Coronavirus) (Scotland) Amendment Rules 2021 (S.S.I 2021 No. 80)
- The Health Protection (Coronavirus) (International Travel) (Scotland) Amendment (No. 6) Regulations 2021 (revoked) (S.S.I 2021 No. 81)
- The Milk and Healthy Snack Scheme (Scotland) Regulations 2021 (S.S.I 2021 No. 82)
- The Zoonoses Amendment (Coronavirus) (Scotland) Order 2021 (S.S.I 2021 No. 83)
- The Animal Welfare (Licensing of Activities Involving Animals) (Scotland) Regulations 2021 (S.S.I 2021 No. 84)
- The Land Reform (Scotland) Act 2016 (Register of Persons Holding a Controlled Interest in Land) Regulations 2021 (S.S.I 2021 No. 85)
- The Health Protection (Coronavirus) (Restrictions and Requirements) (Local Levels) (Scotland) Amendment (No. 16) Regulations 2021 (S.S.I 2021 No. 86)
- The Plant Health and Plant Propagating Material (Miscellaneous Amendments) (Scotland) Regulations 2021 (S.S.I 2021 No. 87)
- The Plant Health (Export Certification) (Scotland) Amendment Order 2021 (S.S.I 2021 No. 88)
- The Scottish Landfill Tax (Standard Rate and Lower Rate) Order 2021 (revoked) (S.S.I 2021 No. 89)
- The A9/A99 Trunk Roads (Latheron) (Temporary 40 mph Speed Restriction) Order 2021 (S.S.I 2021 No. 90)
- The Bee Diseases and Pests Control (Scotland) Amendment Order 2021 (S.S.I 2021 No. 91)
- The North East Scotland Trunk Roads (Temporary Prohibitions of Traffic and Overtaking and Temporary Speed Restrictions) (No. 2) Order 2021 (S.S.I 2021 No. 92)
- The Coronavirus (Scotland) Acts (Early Expiry and Suspension of Provisions) Regulations 2021 (S.S.I 2021 No. 93)
- The North West Scotland Trunk Roads (Temporary Prohibitions of Traffic and Overtaking and Temporary Speed Restrictions) (No. 2) Order 2021 (S.S.I 2021 No. 94)
- The South East Scotland Trunk Roads (Temporary Prohibitions of Traffic and Overtaking and Temporary Speed Restrictions) (No. 2) Order 2021 (S.S.I 2021 No. 95)
- The South West Scotland Trunk Roads (Temporary Prohibitions of Traffic and Overtaking and Temporary Speed Restrictions) (No. 2) Order 2021 (S.S.I 2021 No. 96)
- The Social Security (Industrial Injuries Benefit and Personal Independence Payment) (Telephone and Video Assessment) (Miscellaneous Amendments) (Scotland) Regulations 2021 (S.S.I 2021 No. 97)
- The Town and Country Planning (Cairnryan Border Control Posts) (EU Exit) (Scotland) Special Development Order 2021 (S.S.I 2021 No. 98)
- The Town and Country Planning (Pre-Application Consultation) (Scotland) Amendment Regulations 2021 (S.S.I 2021 No. 99)
- The Town and Country Planning (Emergency Period and Extended Period) (Coronavirus) (Scotland) Regulations 2021 (S.S.I 2021 No. 100)

== 101-200 ==
- The Planning (Scotland) Act 2019 (Commencement No. 6 and Transitional Provision) Regulations 2021 (S.S.I 2021 No. 101 (C. 4))
- The National Health Service Superannuation and Pension Schemes (Miscellaneous Amendments) (Scotland) Regulations 2021 (S.S.I 2021 No. 102)
- The Looked After Children (Scotland) Amendment Regulations 2021 (S.S.I 2021 No. 103)
- The Period Products (Free Provision) (Scotland) Act 2021 (Commencement No. 1) Regulations 2021 (S.S.I 2021 No. 104 (C. 5))
- The M8 (Newhouse to Easterhouse) M73 (Maryville to Mollinsburn) A8 (Newhouse to Bargeddie) A725 (Shawhead to Whistleberry) Trunk Roads (Temporary Prohibitions of Traffic and Overtaking and Temporary Speed Restrictions) Order 2021 (S.S.I 2021 No. 105)
- The Agricultural Holdings (Relinquishment and Assignation) (Application to Relevant Partnerships) (Scotland) Regulations 2021 (S.S.I 2021 No. 106)
- The Health Protection (Coronavirus) (International Travel) (Managed Accommodation and Testing etc.) (Scotland) Amendment Regulations 2021 (revoked) (S.S.I 2021 No. 107)
- The Human Tissue (Authorisation) (Scotland) Act 2019 (Commencement No. 2) Regulations 2021 (S.S.I 2021 No. 108 (C. 6))
- The Food, Natural Mineral Water, Spring Water and Bottled Drinking Water (EU Exit) (Scotland) (Amendment) Amendment Regulations 2021 (S.S.I 2021 No. 109)
- The Human Tissue (Authorisation) (Specified Type B Procedures) (Scotland) Regulations 2021 (S.S.I 2021 No. 110)
- The Health Protection (Coronavirus) (International Travel) (Scotland) Amendment (No. 7) Regulations 2021 (revoked) (S.S.I 2021 No. 111)
- The A78 Trunk Road (Largs) (Temporary Prohibition on Use, Waiting, Loading and Unloading) (No. 2) Order 2021 (S.S.I 2021 No. 112)
- The Property Factors (Code of Conduct) (Scotland) Order 2021 (S.S.I 2021 No. 113)
- The A77 Trunk Road (Minishant) (Temporary Prohibition on Use, Waiting, Loading and Unloading) Order 2021 (S.S.I 2021 No. 114)
- The National Assistance (Assessment of Resources and Sums for Personal Requirements) Amendment (Scotland) Regulations 2021 (S.S.I 2021 No. 115)
- Act of Adjournal (Criminal Procedure Rules 1996 Amendment) (Electronic Authentication of Copy Documents) 2021 (S.S.I 2021 No. 116)
- The Health Protection (Coronavirus) (Restrictions and Requirements) (Miscellaneous Amendments) (Scotland) (No. 2) Regulations 2021 (S.S.I 2021 No. 117)
- The Eyemouth Harbour Revision Order 2021 (S.S.I 2021 No. 118)
- The Local Authority (Capital Finance and Accounting) (Scotland) (Coronavirus) Amendment Regulations 2021 (S.S.I 2021 No. 119)
- The Non-Domestic Rates (Scotland) Act 2020 (Commencement No. 2, Transitional and Saving Provisions) Amendment Regulations 2021 (S.S.I 2021 No. 120 (C. 7))
- The A78 Trunk Road (Largs) (Temporary Prohibition on Use, Waiting, Loading and Unloading) (No. 3) Order 2021 (S.S.I 2021 No. 121)
- he Disability Assistance for Children

and Young People (Consequential Amendments) (Scotland) Regulations 2021 (S.S.I 2021 No. 122)

- The Foods for Specific Groups (Infant Formula and Follow-on Formula) (Scotland) Amendment Regulations 2021 (S.S.I 2021 No. 123)
- The Scottish Elections (Reform) Act 2020 (Commencement No. 2 and Saving Provision) Regulations 2021 (S.S.I 2021 No. 124 (C. 8))
- The Civil Litigation (Expenses and Group Proceedings) (Scotland) Act 2018 (Commencement No. 4 and Transitional Provision) Regulations 2021 (S.S.I 2021 No. 125 (C. 9))
- The Burial and Cremation (Scotland) Act 2016 (Commencement No. 4) Regulations 2021 (S.S.I 2021 No. 126 (C. 10))
- The Children and Young People (Scotland) Act 2014 (Modification) Order 2021 (S.S.I 2021 No. 127)
- The A82 and A87 Trunk Roads (Invergarry) (40 mph Speed Limit and Part Time 20 mph Speed Limit) Order 2021 (S.S.I 2021 No. 128)
- The Companies Act 2006 (Scottish public sector companies to be audited by the Auditor General for Scotland) Order 2021 (S.S.I 2021 No. 129)
- The Animal Health (Notification and Control Measures) (Miscellaneous Amendments) (Scotland) Order 2021 (S.S.I 2021 No. 130)
- The Red Rocks and Longay Urgent Marine Conservation Order 2021 (revoked) (S.S.I 2021 No. 131)
- The Scottish Fire and Rescue Service (Appointment of Chief Inspector) Order 2021 (S.S.I 2021 No. 132)
- The Carers (Scotland) Act 2016 (Adult Carers and Young Carers of Terminally Ill Persons: Timescales for Adult Carer Support Plans and Young Carer Statements etc.) Regulations 2021 (S.S.I 2021 No. 133)
- The Single Use Carrier Bags Charge (Scotland) Amendment Regulations 2021 (S.S.I 2021 No. 134)
- The Community Care (Personal Care and Nursing Care) (Scotland) Amendment Regulations 2021 (S.S.I 2021 No. 135)
- The Health Protection (Coronavirus) (Restrictions and Requirements) (Local Levels) (Scotland) Amendment (No. 17) Regulations 2021 (S.S.I 2021 No. 136)
- The Council Tax Reduction (Scotland) Amendment (No. 3) (Coronavirus) Regulations 2021 (S.S.I 2021 No. 137)
- The Trade in Animals and Related Products (EU Exit) (Scotland) (Amendment) Regulations 2021 (S.S.I 2021 No. 138)
- The Registers of Scotland (Fees) Amendment Order 2021 (S.S.I 2021 No. 139)
- The Carer’s Allowance (Coronavirus) (Breaks in Care) (Scotland) Amendment Regulations 2021 (S.S.I 2021 No. 140)
- The UK Withdrawal from the European Union (Continuity) (Scotland) Act 2021 (Commencement No. 1) Regulations 2021 (S.S.I 2021 No. 141 (C. 11))
- The Town and Country Planning (Emergency Period and Extended Period) (Coronavirus) (Scotland) Amendment Regulations 2021 (revoked) (S.S.I 2021 No. 142)
- The A78 Trunk Road (Shore Road) (Temporary Prohibition on Use, Waiting, Loading and Unloading) Order 2021 (S.S.I 2021 No. 143)
- The Community Orders (Coronavirus) (Scotland) Regulations 2021 (S.S.I 2021 No. 144)
- The Non-Domestic Rates (Restriction of Relief) (Scotland) Regulations 2021 (S.S.I 2021 No. 145)
- The A92 Trunk Road (Halbeath to Crossgates) (Temporary 40 mph and 50 mph Speed Restriction) Order 2021 (S.S.I 2021 No. 146)
- The Civil Contingencies Act 2004 (Amendment of List of Responders) (Scotland) Order 2021 (S.S.I 2021 No. 147)
- The Bankruptcy (Miscellaneous Amendments) (Scotland) Regulations 2021 (S.S.I 2021 No. 148)
- The First-tier Tribunal for Scotland Social Security Chamber (Allocation of Functions) Amendment Regulations 2021 (S.S.I 2021 No. 149)
- The Criminal Justice (Scotland) Act 2003 (Supplemental Provisions) Order 2021 (S.S.I 2021 No. 150)
- The Non-Domestic Rates (Coronavirus Reliefs) (Scotland) Regulations 2021 (S.S.I 2021 No. 151)
- The Coronavirus (Scotland) Acts (Amendment of Expiry Dates) Regulations 2021 (revoked) (S.S.I 2021 No. 152)
- Act of Sederunt (Rules of the Court of Session 1994 Amendment) (Court Sittings) 2021 (S.S.I 2021 No. 153)
- The Town and Country Planning (Short-term Let Control Areas) (Scotland) Regulations 2021 (S.S.I 2021 No. 154)
- The Scottish Parliament Elections (Returning Officer Fees and Charges) Regulations 2021 (S.S.I 2021 No. 155)
- The A78 Trunk Road (Largs) (Temporary Prohibition on Use, Waiting, Loading and Unloading) (No. 4) Order 2021 (S.S.I 2021 No. 156)
- The Local Government Finance (Scotland) Order 2021 (S.S.I 2021 No. 157)
- The Health Protection (Coronavirus) (International Travel etc.) (Scotland) Amendment Regulations 2021 (revoked) (S.S.I 2021 No. 158)
- The Plant Health (EU Exit) (Scotland) (Amendment) Regulations 2021 (S.S.I 2021 No. 159)
- The Specified Diseases (Notification and Slaughter) Amendment (Scotland) Order 2021 (S.S.I 2021 No. 160)
- The Meat Preparations (Import Conditions) (Scotland) Amendment Regulations 2021 (S.S.I 2021 No. 161)
- The A78 Trunk Road (Gallowgate Street, Largs) (Temporary Prohibition on Waiting and Temporary Prohibition on Loading and Unloading) Order 2021 (S.S.I 2021 No. 162)
- The Budget (Scotland) Act 2020 Amendment Regulations 2021 (S.S.I 2021 No. 163)
- The

Scottish Parliament (Elections etc.) Amendment (Coronavirus) Order 2021 (S.S.I 2021 No. 164)

- The Scottish Parliament Elections (Returning Officer Fees and Charges) Amendment Regulations 2021 (S.S.I 2021 No. 165)
- The Health Protection (Coronavirus) (Restrictions and Requirements) (Local Levels) (Scotland) Amendment (No. 18) Regulations 2021 (S.S.I 2021 No. 166)
- The M8 (Newhouse to Easterhouse) M73 (Maryville to Mollinsburn) M74 (Daldowie to Hamilton) A8 (Newhouse to Bargeddie) A725 (Shawhead to Whistleberry) A7071 (Bellshill) Trunk Roads (Temporary Prohibitions of Traffic and Overtaking and Temporary Speed Restrictions) Order 2021 (S.S.I 2021 No. 167)
- The Health Protection (Coronavirus) (Restrictions and Requirements) (Local Levels) (Scotland) Amendment (No. 18) Amendment Regulations 2021 (S.S.I 2021 No. 168)
- The Social Security Up-rating (Scotland) Order 2021 (S.S.I 2021 No. 169)
- The Social Security (Up-rating) (Miscellaneous Amendment) (Scotland) Regulations 2021 (S.S.I 2021 No. 170)
- The North West Scotland Trunk Roads (Temporary Prohibitions of Traffic and Overtaking and Temporary Speed Restrictions) (No. 3) Order 2021 (S.S.I. 2021 No. 171)
- The North East Scotland Trunk Roads (Temporary Prohibitions of Traffic and Overtaking and Temporary Speed Restrictions) (No. 3) Order 2021 (S.S.I. 2021 No. 172)
- The South East Scotland Trunk Roads (Temporary Prohibitions of Traffic and Overtaking and Temporary Speed Restrictions) (No. 3) Order 2021 (S.S.I. 2021 No. 173)
- The Disability Assistance for Children and Young People (Scotland) Regulations 2021 (S.S.I. 2021 No. 174)
- The National Bus Travel Concession Scheme for Young Persons (Scotland) Order 2021 (S.S.I. 2021 No. 175)
- The M73 Trunk Road (Maryville to Mollinsburn) (Temporary 50 mph Speed Restriction) Order 2021 (S.S.I. 2021 No. 176)
- The Low Emission Zones (Emission Standards, Exemptions and Enforcement) (Scotland) Regulations 2021 (S.S.I. 2021 No. 177)
- The Social Security Information-sharing (Scotland) Regulations 2021 (S.S.I. 2021 No. 178)
- The Health Protection (Coronavirus) (International Travel) (Scotland) Amendment (No. 8) Regulations 2021 (revoked) (S.S.I. 2021 No. 179)
- The Health Protection (Coronavirus) (Restrictions and Requirements) (Local Levels) (Scotland) Amendment (No. 19) Regulations 2021 (S.S.I. 2021 No. 180)
- The Health Protection (Coronavirus) (International Travel etc.) (Miscellaneous Amendments) (Scotland) Regulations 2021 (revoked)

(S.S.I. 2021 No. 181)

- The A84 Trunk Road (Main Street, Callander) (Temporary Prohibition on Waiting, Loading and Unloading) Order 2021 (S.S.I. 2021 No. 182)
- The A85 Trunk Road (Dundas Street and Burrell Street, Comrie) (Temporary Prohibition on Waiting, Loading and Unloading) Order 2021 (S.S.I. 2021 No. 183)
- The A87 Trunk Road (Eilean Donan) (Temporary Clearway) Order 2021 (S.S.I. 2021 No. 184)
- The A82 Trunk Road (Tyndrum to North Ballachulish) (Clearway) Order 2021 (S.S.I. 2021 No. 185)
- The Health Protection (Coronavirus) (Restrictions and Requirements) (Local Levels) (Scotland) Amendment (No. 20) Regulations 2021 (S.S.I. 2021 No. 186)
- The A84 Trunk Road (Callander) (Temporary 20 mph Speed Restriction) Order 2021 (S.S.I. 2021 No. 187)
- The A85 Trunk Road (Crieff and Comrie) (Temporary 20 mph Speed Restriction) Order 2021 (S.S.I. 2021 No. 188)
- The M8/A8/A89 Trunk Road Junction 15 (Townhead) to Junction 18 (Charing Cross) (Temporary Prohibition of Traffic and Temporary 40 mph Speed Restriction) Order 2021 (S.S.I. 2021 No. 189)
- The A84/A85 Trunk Road (Callander) (Temporary Prohibition on Use of Road, Waiting, Loading and Unloading) Order 2021 (S.S.I. 2021 No. 190)
- The Health Protection (Coronavirus) (International Travel) (Scotland) Amendment (No. 9) Regulations 2021 (revoked) (S.S.I. 2021 No. 191)
- The Stornoway Port Authority Harbour Revision Order 2021 (S.S.I. 2021 No. 192)
- The Health Protection (Coronavirus) (Restrictions and Requirements) (Local Levels) (Scotland) Amendment (No. 21) Regulations 2021 (S.S.I. 2021 No. 193)
- The A830 Trunk Road (Glenfinnan) (Temporary Clearway) Order 2021 (S.S.I. 2021 No. 194)
- The North East Scotland Trunk Roads (Temporary Prohibitions of Traffic and Overtaking and Temporary Speed Restrictions) (No. 4) Order 2021 (S.S.I. 2021 No. 195)
- The North West Scotland Trunk Roads (Temporary Prohibitions of Traffic and Overtaking and Temporary Speed Restrictions) (No. 4) Order 2021 (S.S.I. 2021 No. 196)
- The South East Scotland Trunk Roads (Temporary Prohibitions of Traffic and Overtaking and Temporary Speed Restrictions) (No. 4) Order 2021 (S.S.I. 2021 No. 197)
- The South West Scotland Trunk Roads (Temporary Prohibitions of Traffic and Overtaking and Temporary Speed Restrictions) (No. 3) Order 2021 (S.S.I. 2021 No. 198)
- The M8 (Newhouse to Easterhouse) M73 (Maryville to Mollinsburn) M74 (Daldowie to Hamilton) A725 (Shawhead to Whistleberry) Trunk Roads (Temporary Prohibitions of Traffic and Overtaking and Temporary Speed Restrictions) (No. 2) Order 2021 (S.S.I. 2021 No. 199)
- The A835 Trunk Road (Ben Wyvis) (Temporary Clearway) Order 2021 (S.S.I. 2021 No. 200)

== 201-300 ==
- The A6091/A7 Trunk Road (Selkirk) (Temporary Prohibition on Waiting, Loading and Unloading) Order 2021 (S.S.I. 2021 No. 201)
- The Health Protection (Coronavirus) (Restrictions and Requirements) (Local Levels) (Scotland) Amendment (No. 22) Regulations 2021 (S.S.I. 2021

No. 202)

- The A83 Trunk Road (Arrochar) (Temporary Prohibition on Waiting, Loading and Unloading) Order 2021 (S.S.I. 2021 No. 203)
- The Health Protection (Coronavirus) (International Travel) (Scotland) Amendment (No. 10) Regulations 2021 (revoked) (S.S.I. 2021 No. 204)
- The A83 Trunk Road (Campbeltown) (Temporary Prohibition of Specified Turns and Temporary Prohibition on Waiting, Loading and Unloading) Order 2021 (S.S.I. 2021 No. 205)
- The Milk and Healthy Snack Scheme (Scotland) Amendment Regulations 2021 (S.S.I. 2021 No. 206)
- The UEFA European Championship (Scotland) Act 2020 (Championship Period and Transitory Provision etc.) Regulations 2021 (S.S.I. 2021 No. 207)
- The Health Protection (Coronavirus) (International Travel etc.) (Miscellaneous Amendments) (Scotland) (No. 2) Regulations 2021 (revoked) (S.S.I. 2021 No. 208)
- The Health Protection (Coronavirus) (Restrictions and Requirements) (Local Levels) (Scotland) Amendment (No. 23) Regulations 2021 (S.S.I. 2021 No. 209)
- The Education (Scotland) Act 1980 (Modification) Regulations 2021 (S.S.I. 2021 No. 210)
- The Health Protection (Coronavirus) (Restrictions and Requirements) (Local Levels) (Scotland) Amendment (No. 24) Regulations 2021 (S.S.I. 2021 No. 211)
- The Health Protection (Coronavirus) (International Travel) (Scotland) Amendment (No. 11) Regulations 2021 (revoked) (S.S.I. 2021 No. 212)
- The M8 (Newhouse to Easterhouse) M73 (Maryville to Mollinsburn) A8 (Newhouse to Bargeddie) A725 (Shawhead to Whistleberry) Trunk Roads (Temporary Prohibitions of Traffic and Overtaking and Temporary Speed Restrictions) (No. 2) Order 2021 (S.S.I. 2021 No. 213)
- The Coronavirus (Scotland) Act 2020 (Early Expiry of Provisions) Regulations 2021 (S.S.I. 2021 No. 214)
- The A68 Trunk Road (Leaderfoot) (Temporary Prohibition on Use of Road) Order 2021 (S.S.I. 2021 No. 215)
- The North East Scotland Trunk Roads (Temporary Prohibitions of Traffic and Overtaking and Temporary Speed Restrictions) (No. 5) Order 2021 (S.S.I. 2021 No. 216)
- The North West Scotland Trunk Roads (Temporary Prohibitions of Traffic and Overtaking and Temporary Speed Restrictions) (No. 5) Order 2021 (S.S.I. 2021 No. 217)
- The South East Scotland Trunk Roads (Temporary Prohibitions of Traffic and Overtaking and Temporary Speed Restrictions) (No. 5) Order 2021 (S.S.I. 2021 No. 218)
- The South West Scotland Trunk Roads (Temporary Prohibitions of Traffic and Overtaking and Temporary Speed Restrictions) (No. 4) Order 2021 (S.S.I. 2021 No. 219)
- The Sexual Offences Act 2003 (Prescribed Police Stations) (Scotland) Amendment Regulations 2021 (S.S.I. 2021 No. 220)
- The Welfare Foods (Best Start Foods) (Scotland) Amendment Regulations 2021 (S.S.I. 2021 No. 221)
- The Homeless Persons (Unsuitable Accommodation) (Scotland) (Modification and Revocation) (Coronavirus) Amendment Order 2021 (S.S.I. 2021 No. 222)
- The A82 Trunk Road (Glencoe, Altnafeadh and Rannoch Moor) (Temporary Prohibition on Use of Road) Order 2021 (S.S.I. 2021 No. 223)
- The Health Protection (Coronavirus) (Restrictions and Requirements) (Local Levels) (Scotland) Amendment (No. 25) Regulations 2021 (S.S.I. 2021 No. 224)
- Act of Sederunt (Fees of Messengers-at-Arms and Sheriff Officers) (Amendment) 2021 (S.S.I. 2021 No. 225)
- Act of Sederunt (Rules of the Court of Session 1994, Sheriff Appeal Court Rules and Sheriff Court Rules Amendment) (Qualified One-Way Costs Shifting) 2021 (S.S.I. 2023 No. 226)
- The Health Protection (Coronavirus) (Restrictions and Requirements) (Local Levels) (Scotland) Amendment (No. 26) Regulations 2021 (S.S.I. 2023 No. 227)
- The A68 Trunk Road (Leaderfoot) (Temporary Prohibition on Use of Road) (No. 2) Order 2021 (S.S.I. 2023 No. 228)
- The A83 Trunk Road (Lochgilphead) (Temporary Prohibition on Use of Road) Order 2021 (S.S.I. 2023 No. 229)
- The Health Protection (Coronavirus) (International Travel) (Scotland) Amendment (No. 12) Regulations 2021 (revoked) (S.S.I. 2023 No. 230)
- The Valuation Timetable (Coronavirus) (Scotland) Amendment Order 2021 (S.S.I. 2023 No. 231)
- The Social Security Administration and Tribunal Membership (Scotland) Act 2020 (Commencement No. 2) Regulations 2021 (S.S.I. 2023 No. 232 (C. 12))
- The Age of Criminal Responsibility (Scotland) Act 2019 (Register of Child Interview Rights Practitioners) Regulations 2021 (S.S.I. 2023 No. 233)
- The Redress for Survivors (Historical Child Abuse in Care) (Scotland) Act 2021 (Commencement No. 1) Regulations 2021 (S.S.I. 2023 No. 234 (C. 13))
- The A9 Trunk Road (Auchterarder Junction at A824) (Temporary Prohibition of Specified Turns) Order 2021 (S.S.I. 2023 No. 235)
- The Coronavirus (Scotland) Act 2020 (Early Expiry of Provisions) (No. 2) Regulations 2021 (S.S.I. 2023 No. 236)
- The Health Protection (Coronavirus) (International Travel) (Scotland) Amendment (No. 13) Regulations 2021 (revoked) (S.S.I. 2023 No. 237)
- The Health Protection (Coronavirus) (Restrictions and Requirements) (Local Levels) (Scotland) Amendment (No. 27) Regulations 2021 (S.S.I. 2023 No. 238)
- The Domestic Abuse Act 2021 (Commencement) (Scotland) Regulations 2021 (S.S.I. 2023 No. 239 (C. 14))
- The A84/A85 Trunk Road (Callander) (Temporary Prohibition on Use of Road, Waiting, Loading and Unloading) (No. 2) Order 2021 (S.S.I. 2023 No. 240)
- The National Health Service (Travelling Expenses and Remission of Charges) (Scotland) (No. 2) Amendment Regulations 2021 (S.S.I. 2023 No. 241)
- The Health Protection (Coronavirus) (Restrictions and Requirements) (Local Levels) (Scotland) Amendment (No. 28) Regulations 2021 (S.S.I. 2023 No. 242)
- The M8 (Newhouse to Easterhouse) M73 (Maryville to Mollinsburn) M74 (Daldowie to Hamilton) A8 (Newhouse to Bargeddie) A725 (Shawhead to Whistleberry) A7071 (Bellshill) Trunk Roads (Temporary Prohibitions of Traffic and Overtaking and Temporary Speed Restrictions) (No.2) Order 2021 (S.S.I. 2023 No. 243)
- The Planning (Scotland) Act 2019 (Commencement No. 7) Regulations 2021 (S.S.I. 2023 No. 244 (C. 15))
- The North East Scotland Trunk Roads (Temporary Prohibitions of Traffic and Overtaking and Temporary Speed Restrictions) (No. 6) Order 2021 (S.S.I. 2023 No. 245)
- The South East Scotland Trunk Roads (Temporary Prohibitions of Traffic and Overtaking and Temporary Speed Restrictions) (No. 6) Order 2021 (S.S.I. 2023 No. 246)
- The North West Scotland Trunk Roads (Temporary Prohibitions of Traffic and Overtaking and Temporary Speed Restrictions) (No. 6) Order 2021 (S.S.I. 2023 No. 247)
- The A90 Trunk Road (Stirling to Invernettie Roundabout) (Temporary 40 mph Speed Restriction) Order 2021 (S.S.I. 2023 No. 248)
- The Council Tax Reduction (Scotland) Regulations 2021 (S.S.I. 2023 No. 249)
- The Coronavirus Act 2020 (Suspension: Disposal of Bodies) (Scotland) Regulations 2021 (S.S.I. 2023 No. 250)
- The Registration of Independent Schools (Scotland) Amendment Regulations 2021 (S.S.I. 2023 No. 251)
- The Health Protection (Coronavirus) (Restrictions and Requirements) (Local Levels) (Scotland) Amendment (No. 29) Regulations 2021 (S.S.I. 2023 No. 252)
- The A83 Trunk Road (Campbeltown) (Temporary Prohibition of Specified Turns and Temporary Prohibition on Waiting, Loading and Unloading) (No. 2) Order 2021 (S.S.I. 2023 No. 253)
- The Health Protection (Coronavirus) (International Travel etc.) (Miscellaneous Amendments) (Scotland) (No. 3) Regulations 2021 (S.S.I. 2023 No. 254)
- The Health Protection (Coronavirus) (Restrictions and Requirements) (Local Levels) (Scotland) Amendment (No. 30) Regulations 2021 (S.S.I. 2023 No. 255)
- The Health Protection (Coronavirus) (International Travel) (Scotland) Amendment (No. 14) Regulations 2021 (revoked) (S.S.I. 2023 No. 256)
- The A9 and A889 Trunk Roads (Dalwhinnie to Crubenmore) (Side Roads) Order 2021 (S.S.I. 2023 No. 257)
- The A9 Trunk Road (Glen Garry to Dalwhinnie) (Side Roads) Order 2021 (S.S.I. 2023 No. 258)
- The A889 Trunk Road (Dalwhinnie to Crubenmore) (Trunking) Order 2021 (S.S.I. 2023 No. 259)
- The A9 Trunk Road (Glen Garry to Dalwhinnie) (Trunking) Order 2021 (S.S.I. 2023 No. 260)
- The Health Protection (Coronavirus) (International Travel etc.) (Miscellaneous Amendments) (Scotland) (No. 4) Regulations 2021 (revoked) (S.S.I. 2023 No. 261)
- The Health Protection (Coronavirus) (Restrictions and Requirements) (Local Levels) (Scotland) Amendment (No. 31) Regulations 2021 (S.S.I. 2023 No. 262)
- The Health Protection (Coronavirus) (Restrictions and Requirements) (Local Levels) (Scotland) Amendment (No. 32) Regulations 2021 (S.S.I. 2023 No. 263)
- The Health Protection (Coronavirus) (International Travel etc.) (Miscellaneous Amendments) (Scotland) (No. 5) Regulations 2021 (revoked) (S.S.I. 2023 No. 264)
- The Health Protection (Coronavirus) (International Travel etc.) (Miscellaneous Amendments) (Scotland) (No. 6) Regulations 2021 (revoked) (S.S.I. 2023 No. 265)
- The A6091/A7 Trunk Road (Selkirk) (Temporary Prohibition on Waiting, Loading and Unloading) Order 2021 (S.S.I. 2023 No. 266)
- The A85 Trunk Road (Methven) (Temporary Prohibition on Waiting, Loading and Unloading) Order 2021 (S.S.I. 2023 No. 267)
- The North East Scotland Trunk Roads (Temporary Prohibitions of Traffic and Overtaking and Temporary Speed Restrictions) (No. 7) Order 2021 (S.S.I. 2023 No. 268)
- The North West Scotland Trunk Roads (Temporary Prohibitions of Traffic and Overtaking and Temporary Speed Restrictions) (No. 7) Order 2021 (S.S.I. 2023 No. 269)
- The South East Scotland Trunk Roads (Temporary Prohibitions of Traffic and Overtaking and Temporary Speed Restrictions) (No. 7) Order 2021 (S.S.I. 2023 No. 270)
- The South West Scotland Trunk Roads (Temporary Prohibitions of Traffic and Overtaking and Temporary Speed Restrictions) (No. 5) Order 2021 (S.S.I. 2023 No. 271)
- The M8 (Newhouse to Easterhouse) M73 (Maryville to Mollinsburn) M74 (Daldowie to Hamilton) A725 (Shawhead to Whistleberry) Trunk Roads (Temporary Prohibitions of Traffic and Overtaking and Temporary Speed Restrictions) (No. 3) Order 2021 (S.S.I. 2023 No. 272)
- The A83 Trunk Road (Tarbert) (Temporary Prohibition on Use of Road) Order 2021 (S.S.I. 2023 No. 273)
- The Milk and Healthy Snack Scheme (Scotland) Amendment (No. 2) Regulations 2021 (S.S.I. 2023 No. 274)
- The Health Protection (Coronavirus) (International Travel) (Scotland) Amendment (No. 15) Regulations 2021 (revoked) (S.S.I. 2023 No. 275)
- The A96 Trunk Road (Regent Street, Keith) (Temporary Prohibition on Waiting, Loading and Unloading) Order 2021 (S.S.I. 2023 No. 276)
- The Health Protection (Coronavirus) (Requirements) (Scotland) Regulations 2021 (revoked) (S.S.I. 2023 No. 277)
- The Health Protection (Coronavirus) (International Travel etc.) (Miscellaneous Amendments) (Scotland) (No. 7) Regulations 2021 (revoked) (S.S.I. 2023 No. 278)
- The South West Scotland Trunk Roads (Temporary Prohibitions of Traffic and Overtaking and Temporary Speed Restrictions) (No. 6) Order 2021 (S.S.I. 2023 No. 279)
- The Coronavirus (Extension and Expiry) (Scotland) Act 2021 (Evidence) (Saving Provision) Regulations 2021 (S.S.I. 2023 No. 280)
- The A9 Trunk Road (Kessock Bridge) (Temporary Prohibition on Use of Road and Temporary 30 mph Speed Restriction) Order 2021 (S.S.I. 2023 No. 281)
- The Sexual Offences Act 2003 (Prescribed Police Stations) (Scotland) Amendment (No. 2) Regulations 2021 (S.S.I. 2023 No. 282)
- The North West Scotland Trunk Roads (Temporary Prohibitions of Traffic and Overtaking and Temporary Speed Restrictions) (No. 8) Order 2021 (S.S.I. 2023 No. 283)
- The South West Scotland Trunk Roads (Temporary Prohibitions of Traffic and Overtaking and Temporary Speed Restrictions) (No. 7) Order 2021 (S.S.I. 2023 No. 284)
- The North East Scotland Trunk Roads (Temporary Prohibitions of Traffic and Overtaking and Temporary Speed Restrictions) (No. 8) Order 2021 (S.S.I. 2023 No. 285)
- The M8 (Newhouse to Easterhouse) M73 (Maryville to Mollinsburn) A8 (Newhouse to Bargeddie) A725 (Shawhead to Whistleberry) Trunk Roads (Temporary Prohibitions of Traffic and Overtaking and Temporary Speed Restrictions) (No. 3) Order 2021 (S.S.I. 2023 No. 286)
- The South East Scotland Trunk Roads (Temporary Prohibitions of Traffic and Overtaking and Temporary Speed Restrictions) (No. 8) Order 2021 (S.S.I. 2023 No. 287)
- The Meat Preparations (Import Conditions) (Scotland) Amendment (No. 2) Regulations 2021 (S.S.I. 2023 No. 288)
- The Prisons and Young Offenders Institutions (Coronavirus) (Scotland) Amendment (No. 2) Rules 2021 (S.S.I. 2023 No. 289)
- The Health Protection (Coronavirus) (International Travel) (Scotland) Amendment (No. 16) Regulations 2021 (revoked) (S.S.I. 2023 No. 290)
- The Planning (Scotland) Act 2019 (Commencement No. 6 and Transitional Provision) Amendment Regulations 2021 (S.S.I. 2023 No. 291 (C. 16))
- The Town and Country Planning (Miscellaneous Temporary Modifications) (Coronavirus) (Scotland) Regulations 2021 (S.S.I. 2023 No. 292)
- The Town and Country Planning (Cairnryan Border Control Posts) (EU Exit) (Scotland) Special Development Amendment Order 2021 (S.S.I. 2023 No. 293)
- The A82 Trunk Road (Kinghouse to Glencoe) (Temporary Prohibition on Use of Road) Order 2021 (S.S.I. 2023 No. 294)
- Act of Sederunt (Simple Procedure Amendment) (Civil Online) 2021 (S.S.I. 2023 No. 295)
- The A6091/A7 Trunk Road (Selkirk) (Temporary Prohibition on Waiting, Loading and Unloading) (No. 2) Order 2021 (S.S.I. 2023 No. 296)
- The Official Controls (Transitional Staging Period) (Miscellaneous Amendments) (Scotland) Regulations 2021 (S.S.I. 2023 No. 297)
- The A87 Trunk Road (Skye) (Temporary Prohibition on Use of Road) Order 2021 (S.S.I. 2023 No. 298)
- The Health Protection (Coronavirus) (Requirements) (Scotland) Amendment Regulations 2021 (S.S.I. 2023 No. 299)
- The A68 Trunk Road (Ancrum to St Boswells) (Temporary 40 mph Speed Restriction) Order 2021 (S.S.I. 2023 No. 300)

== 301-400 ==
- The Health Protection (Coronavirus) (International Travel) (Scotland) Amendment (No. 17) Regulations 2021 (revoked) (S.S.I. 2023 No. 301)
- The National Health Service (General Medical Services and Primary Medical Services Section 17C Agreements) (Scotland) Amendment Regulations 2021 (S.S.I. 2023 No. 302)
- The Animals and Wildlife (Penalties, Protections and Powers) (Scotland) Act 2020 (Commencement No. 3 and Transitional Provision) Regulations 2021 (S.S.I. 2023 No. 303 (C. 17))
- The UK Withdrawal from the European Union (Continuity) (Scotland) Act 2021 (Commencement No. 2) Regulations 2021 (S.S.I. 2023 No. 304 (C. 18))
- The Social Security (Claims and Payments) (Miscellaneous Amendments) (Scotland) Regulations 2021 (S.S.I. 2023 No. 305)
- The A82 Trunk Road (Glencoe) (Temporary Prohibition on Use of Road and 30 mph Speed Restriction) Order 2021 (S.S.I. 2023 No. 306)
- The Health Protection (Coronavirus) (International Travel) (Scotland) Amendment (No. 18) Regulations 2021 (revoked) (S.S.I. 2023 No. 307)
- The Scottish Crown Estate Act 2019 (Commencement No. 3) Regulations 2021 (S.S.I. 2023 No. 308 (C. 19))
- Act of Sederunt (Registration Appeal Court) 2021 (S.S.I. 2023 No. 309)
- The Representation of the People (Variation of Limits of Candidates’ Local Government Election Expenses) (Scotland) Order 2021 (S.S.I. 2023 No. 310)
- The Scottish Elections (Reform) Act 2020 (Commencement No. 3 and Transitional Provision) Regulations 2021 (S.S.I. 2023 No. 311 (C. 20))
- The Redress for Survivors (Historical Child Abuse in Care) (Reimbursement of Costs and Expenses) (Scotland) Regulations 2021 (S.S.I. 2023 No. 312)
- The Redress for Survivors (Historical Child Abuse in Care) (Payment of Legal Fees) (Scotland) Regulations 2021 (S.S.I. 2023 No. 313)
- The Local Electoral Administration and Registration Services (Scotland) Act 2006 (Commencement No. 6 and Transitional Provision) Order 2021 (S.S.I. 2023 No. 314 (C. 21))
- The Coronavirus Act 2020 (Suspension: Children and Young Persons Social Care) (Scotland) Regulations 2021 (S.S.I. 2023 No. 315)
- Act of Adjournal (Criminal Procedure Rules 1996 Amendment) (Extradition) 2021 (S.S.I. 2023 No. 316)
- The Representation of the People (Absent Voting at Local

Government Elections) (Scotland) Amendment Regulations 2021 (S.S.I. 2023 No. 317)

- The Carbon Accounting Scheme (Scotland) Amendment Regulations 2021 (S.S.I. 2023 No. 318)
- The Health Protection (Coronavirus) (International Travel) (Scotland) Amendment (No. 19) Regulations 2021 (revoked) (S.S.I. 2023 No. 319)
- The Social Security (Residence Requirements) (Afghanistan) (Scotland) Regulations 2021 (S.S.I. 2023 No. 320)
- The A737 Dalry Bypass (Temporary Prohibitions of Traffic and Overtaking, Temporary 40 mph Speed Restriction, Temporary Prohibition of Waiting, Loading and Unloading) Revocation Order 2021 (S.S.I. 2023 No. 321)
- The Health Protection (Coronavirus) (International Travel and Operator Liability) (Scotland) Regulations 2021 (revoked) (S.S.I. 2023 No. 322)
- The A85 Trunk Road (Comrie) (Temporary Prohibition on Use of Road) Order 2021 (S.S.I. 2023 No. 323)
- Act of Sederunt (Rules of the Court of Session 1994 and Sheriff Court Company Insolvency Rules Amendment) (Insolvency) 2021 (S.S.I. 2023 No. 324)
- The North West Scotland Trunk Roads (Temporary Prohibitions of Traffic and Overtaking and Temporary Speed Restrictions) (No. 9) Order 2021 (S.S.I. 2023 No. 325)
- The North East Scotland Trunk Roads (Temporary Prohibitions of Traffic and Overtaking and Temporary Speed Restrictions) (No. 9) Order 2021 (S.S.I. 2023 No. 326)
- The South East Scotland Trunk Roads (Temporary Prohibitions of Traffic and Overtaking and Temporary Speed Restrictions) (No. 9) Order 2021 (S.S.I. 2023 No. 327)
- The Health Protection (Coronavirus) (International Travel and Operator Liability) (Scotland) Amendment Regulations 2021 (revoked) (S.S.I. 2023 No. 328)
- The Health Protection (Coronavirus, Restrictions) (Directions by Local Authorities) (Scotland) Amendment Regulations 2021 (S.S.I. 2023 No. 329)
- The NHS Education for Scotland Amendment Order 2021 (S.S.I. 2023 No. 330)
- Not Allocated (S.S.I. 2023 No. 331)
- The Fuel Poverty (Targets, Definition and Strategy) (Scotland) Act 2019 (Commencement No. 2) Regulations 2021 (S.S.I. 2023 No. 332)
- The Legal Aid and Advice and Assistance (Miscellaneous Amendment) (Scotland) (No. 2) Regulations 2021 (S.S.I. 2023 No. 333)
- The M8/A8/A89 Trunk Road Junction 15 (Townhead) to Junction 18 (Charing Cross) (Temporary Prohibition of Traffic and Temporary Speed Restrictions) Order 2021 (S.S.I. 2023 No. 334)
- The National Health Service (Free Prescriptions and Charges for Drugs and Appliances) (Scotland) Amendment Regulations 2021 (S.S.I. 2023 No. 335)
- The M8 (Newhouse to Easterhouse) M73 (Maryville to Mollinsburn) M74 (Daldowie to Hamilton) A8 (Newhouse to Bargeddie) A725 (Shawhead to Whistleberry) A7071 (Bellshill) Trunk Roads (Temporary Prohibitions of Traffic and Overtaking and Temporary Speed Restrictions) (No. 3) Order 2021 (S.S.I. 2023 No. 336)
- The Council Tax Reduction (Scotland) Amendment (No. 4) Regulations 2021 (S.S.I. 2023 No. 337)
- The Social Security Administration and Tribunal Membership (Scotland) Act 2020 (Commencement No. 3) Regulations 2021 (S.S.I. 2023 No. 338 (C. 23))
- The Children (Scotland) Act 2020 (Commencement No. 2) Regulations 2021 (S.S.I. 2023 No. 339 (C. 24))
- The Fish Farming Code of Practice (Scotland) Order 2021 (S.S.I. 2023 No. 340)
- The Scottish Tribunals (Eligibility for Appointment) Amendment Regulations 2021 (S.S.I. 2023 No. 341)
- The Official Controls (Transitional Staging Period) (Miscellaneous Amendments) (Scotland) (No. 2) Regulations 2021 (S.S.I. 2023 No. 342)
- The Health Protection (Coronavirus) (International Travel and Operator Liability) (Scotland) Amendment (No. 2) Regulations 2021 (revoked) (S.S.I. 2023 No. 343)
- The Provision of Early Learning and Childcare (Specified Children) (Scotland) Amendment (No. 2) Order 2021 (S.S.I. 2023 No. 344)
- The Social Security (Switzerland) (Further provision in respect of Scotland) Order 2021 (S.S.I. 2023 No. 345)
- The Conference of the Parties to the United Nations Framework Convention on Climate Change (Immunities and Privileges) (Scotland) Order 2021 (S.S.I. 2023 No. 346)
- The European Union and European Atomic Energy Community (Immunities and Privileges) (Scotland) Order 2021 (S.S.I. 2023 No. 347)
- The Traffic Regulation Orders (Procedure) (Miscellaneous Amendments) (Scotland) Regulations 2021 (S.S.I. 2023 No. 348)
- The Health Protection (Coronavirus) (Requirements) (Scotland) Amendment (No. 2) Regulations 2021 (S.S.I. 2023 No. 349)
- The Health Protection (Coronavirus) (International Travel and Operator Liability) (Scotland) Amendment (No. 3) Regulations 2021 (revoked) (S.S.I. 2023 No. 350)
- The Civil Partnership (Scotland) Act 2020 (Commencement No. 4, Saving and Transitional Provision) Regulations 2021 (S.S.I. 2023 No. 351 (C. 25))
- The Social Security Administration and Tribunal Membership (Scotland) Act 2020 (Commencement No. 4) Regulations 2021 (S.S.I. 2023 No. 352 (C. 26))
- The Town and Country Planning (Local Place Plans) (Scotland) Regulations 2021 (S.S.I. 2023 No. 353)
- The Storage of Carbon Dioxide (Licensing etc.) (EU Exit) (Scotland) (Amendment) Regulations 2021 (S.S.I. 2023 No. 354)
- The Criminal Justice and Licensing (Scotland) Act 2010 (Commencement No. 16) Order 2021 (S.S.I. 2023 No. 355 (C. 27))
- The Animal Welfare (Licensing

of Activities Involving Animals) (Scotland) Amendment Regulations 2021 (S.S.I. 2023 No. 356)

- The Health Protection (Coronavirus) (International Travel and Operator Liability) (Scotland) Amendment (No. 4) Regulations 2021 (revoked) (S.S.I. 2023 No. 357)
- The Clydeport (COP 26 etc.) Harbour Revision Order 2021 (S.S.I. 2023 No. 358)
- The Health Protection (Coronavirus) (International Travel and Operator Liability) (Scotland) Amendment (No. 5) Regulations 2021 (revoked) (S.S.I. 2023 No. 359)
- The A85 Trunk Road (Oban) (Temporary Prohibition on Use of Road) Order 2021 (S.S.I. 2023 No. 360)
- The North East Scotland Trunk Roads (Temporary Prohibitions of Traffic and Overtaking and Temporary Speed Restrictions) (No. 10) Order 2021 (S.S.I. 2023 No. 361)
- The North West Scotland Trunk Roads (Temporary Prohibitions of Traffic and Overtaking and Temporary Speed Restrictions) (No. 10) Order 2021 (S.S.I. 2023 No. 362)
- The South East Scotland Trunk Roads (Temporary Prohibitions of Traffic and Overtaking and Temporary Speed Restrictions) (No. 10) Order 2021 (S.S.I. 2023 No. 363)
- The South West Scotland Trunk Roads (Temporary Prohibitions of Traffic and Overtaking and Temporary Speed Restrictions) (No. 8) Order 2021 (S.S.I. 2023 No. 364)
- The A977 Trunk Road (Longannet Roundabout to Gartarry Roundabout) (Temporary Prohibition on Waiting, Loading and Unloading) Order 2021 (S.S.I. 2023 No. 365)
- The M8 (Newhouse to Easterhouse) M73 (Maryville to Mollinsburn) M74 (Daldowie to Hamilton) A725 (Shawhead to Whistleberry) Trunk Roads (Temporary Prohibitions of Traffic and Overtaking and Temporary Speed Restrictions) (No. 4) Order 2021 (S.S.I. 2023 No. 366)
- The National Health Service (Pharmaceutical Services) (Scotland) Amendment Regulations 2021 (S.S.I. 2023 No. 367)
- The Children’s Legal Assistance (Miscellaneous Amendments and Consequential Provisions) (Scotland) Regulations 2021 (S.S.I. 2023 No. 368)
- The Na h-Eileanan an Iar (Electoral Arrangements) Regulations 2021 (S.S.I. 2023 No. 369)
- The North Ayrshire (Electoral Arrangements) Regulations 2021 (S.S.I. 2023 No. 370)
- The Orkney Islands (Electoral Arrangements) Regulations 2021 (S.S.I. 2023 No. 371)
- The Shetland Islands (Electoral Arrangements) Regulations 2021 (S.S.I. 2023 No. 372)
- The A83 Trunk Road (Poltalloch Street, Lochgilphead) (Temporary Prohibition on Use of Road) Order 2021 (S.S.I. 2023 No. 373)
- The A9 Trunk Road (Pitlochry to Killiecrankie) (Trunking) Order 2021 (S.S.I. 2023 No. 374)
- The A85 Trunk Road (Methven) (Temporary Prohibition on Waiting, Loading and Unloading) (No. 2) Order 2021 (S.S.I. 2023 No. 375)
- The A9 Trunk Road (Pitlochry to Killiecrankie) (Side Roads) Order 2021 (S.S.I. 2023 No. 376)
- The A9 Trunk Road (Tay Crossing to Ballinluig) (Side Roads) Order 2021 (S.S.I. 2023 No. 377)
- The Public Procurement (Agreement on Government Procurement) (Thresholds etc.) (Amendment) (Scotland) Regulations 2021 (S.S.I. 2023 No. 378)
- The Protection of Vulnerable Groups (Scotland) Act 2007 (Applications for Removal from List and Late Representations) Amendment Regulations 2021 (S.S.I. 2023 No. 379)
- The Disclosure (Scotland) Act 2020 (Commencement No. 1 and Transitory Provision) Regulations 2021 (S.S.I. 2023 No. 380 (C. 28))
- The National Bus Travel Concession Scheme for Young Persons (Scotland) Amendment Order 2021 (S.S.I. 2023 No. 381)
- The Health Protection (Coronavirus) (International Travel and Operator Liability) (Scotland) Amendment (No. 6) Regulations 2021 (revoked) (S.S.I. 2023 No. 382)
- The Storage of Carbon Dioxide (Licensing etc.) (EU Exit) (Scotland) (Amendment) Amendment Regulations 2021 (S.S.I. 2023 No. 383)
- The Health Protection (Coronavirus) (Requirements) (Scotland) Amendment (No. 3) Regulations 2021 (S.S.I. 2023 No. 384)
- The A85 Trunk Road (Comrie) (Temporary Prohibition on Use of Road) (No. 2) Order 2021 (S.S.I. 2023 No. 385)
- The Lands Tribunal for Scotland (Miscellaneous Amendments) Amendment Rules 2021 (S.S.I. 2023 No. 386)
- The A90 and A96 Trunk Roads (Aberdeen Western Peripheral Route/Balmedie to Tipperty) (Stonehaven Bypass, Portlethen, Murcar to South Ellon and Blackburn to Bucksburn) (Temporary Prohibition of Traffic, Specified Turns, Overtaking and Speed Restrictions) Revocation Order 2021 (S.S.I. 2023 No. 387)
- The A85 Trunk Road (Crieff) (Temporary Prohibition On Use of Road) Order 2021 (S.S.I. 2023 No. 388)
- The A85 Trunk Road (Comrie) (Temporary Prohibition on Use of Road) (No. 3) Order 2021 (S.S.I. 2023 No. 389)
- The A84 Trunk Road (Callander) (Temporary Prohibition on Use of Road) Order 2021 (S.S.I. 2023 No. 390)
- The Coronavirus Act 2020 (Suspension: Disposal of Bodies) (Scotland) (No. 2) Regulations 2021 (S.S.I. 2023 No. 391)
- The A84 Trunk Road (Doune) (Temporary Prohibition On Use of Road) Order 2021 (S.S.I. 2023 No. 392)
- The A9 Trunk Road (Brora) (Temporary Prohibition On Use of Road) Order 2021 (S.S.I. 2023 No. 393)
- The A68 Trunk Road (Cranstoun Church) (Temporary Prohibition on Use of Road) Order 2021 (S.S.I. 2023 No. 394)
- The A84 and A85 Trunk Road (Lochearnhead) (Temporary Prohibition on Use of Road) Order 2021 (S.S.I. 2023 No. 395)
- The

M9/A9 Trunk Road (Thurso) (Temporary Prohibition on Use of Road) Order 2021 (S.S.I. 2023 No. 396)

- The Ethical Standards in Public Life etc. (Scotland) Act 2000 (Register of Interests) Amendment Regulations 2021 (revoked) (S.S.I. 2023 No. 397)
- The Private Storage Aid Scheme (Pigmeat) (Scotland) Regulations 2021 (S.S.I. 2023 No. 398)
- The Social Security (Advocacy Service Standards) (Scotland) Amendment Regulations 2021 (S.S.I. 2023 No. 399)
- The A9 Trunk Road (Glassingall, Dunblane) (Temporary Prohibition of Specified Turns) Order 2021 (S.S.I. 2023 No. 400)

== 401-499 ==
- The A87 Trunk Road (Balmacara) (Temporary Prohibition on Use of Road) Order 2021 (S.S.I. 2023 No. 401)
- The Council Tax Reduction (Scotland) Amendment (No. 5) Regulations 2021 (S.S.I. 2023 No. 402)
- The A7 Trunk Road (Langholm) (Temporary Prohibition on Waiting, Loading and Unloading) Order 2021 (S.S.I. 2023 No. 403)
- The A84 Trunk Road (Callander) (Temporary 20 mph Speed Restriction) (No. 2) Order 2021 (S.S.I. 2023 No. 404)
- The A85 Trunk Road (Crieff and Comrie) (Temporary 20 mph Speed Restriction) (No. 2) Order 2021 (S.S.I. 2023 No. 405)
- The A83 Trunk Road (Tarbert to Campbeltown) (Temporary Prohibition on Use of Road) Order 2021 (S.S.I. 2023 No. 406)
- The A96 Trunk Road (Keith) (Temporary Prohibition on Use of Road) Order 2021 (S.S.I. 2023 No. 407)
- The Forestry (Exemptions) (Scotland) Amendment Regulations 2021 (S.S.I. 2023 No. 408)
- The Diligence against Earnings (Variation) (Scotland) Regulations 2021 (S.S.I. 2023 No. 409)
- The Environmental Protection (Single-use Plastic Products) (Scotland) Regulations 2021 (S.S.I. 2023 No. 410)
- The Town and Country Planning (General Permitted Development) (Coronavirus) (Scotland) Amendment (No. 2) Order 2021 (S.S.I. 2023 No. 411)
- The Water Environment (Controlled Activities) (Scotland) Amendment Regulations 2021 (S.S.I. 2023 No. 412)
- The Redress for Survivors (Historical Child Abuse in Care) (Exceptions to Eligibility) (Scotland) Regulations 2021 (S.S.I. 2023 No. 413)
- The Redress for Survivors (Historical Child Abuse in Care) (Scotland) Act 2021 (Form and Content of Waiver etc.) Regulations 2021 (S.S.I. 2023 No. 414)
- The Winter Heating Assistance for Children and Young People (Scotland) Amendment Regulations 2021 (S.S.I. 2023 No. 415)
- The Disability Assistance for Children and Young People (Scotland) Amendment Regulations 2021 (S.S.I. 2023 No. 416)
- The A83 Trunk Road (Campbeltown) (Temporary Prohibition on Use of Road) Order 2021 (S.S.I. 2023 No. 417)
- The A85 Trunk Road (Oban) (Temporary Prohibition on Use of Road) (No. 2) Order 2021 (S.S.I. 2023 No. 418)
- The Redress for Survivors (Historical Child Abuse in Care) (Scotland) Act 2021 (Commencement No. 2) Regulations 2021 (S.S.I. 2023 No. 419 (C. 29))
- The Age of Criminal Responsibility (Scotland) Act 2019 (Supplementary Provision) (Jurisdiction) Regulations 2021 (S.S.I. 2023 No. 420)
- The Age of Criminal Responsibility (Scotland) Act 2019 (Places of Safety) Regulations 2021 (S.S.I. 2023 No. 421)
- The M9/A9 Trunk Road (Winchburgh Junction 1B at the B8020) (Special Road) (Side Roads) Order 2021 (S.S.I. 2023 No. 422)
- The M9/A9 Trunk Road (Winchburgh Junction 1B at the B8020) Special Road Scheme 2021 (S.S.I. 2023 No. 423)
- The Public Procurement (Agreement on Government Procurement) (Thresholds etc.) (Amendment) (Scotland) Amendment Regulations 2021 (S.S.I. 2023 No. 424)
- The Health Protection (Coronavirus) (International Travel and Operator Liability) (Scotland) Amendment (No. 7) Regulations 2021 (revoked) (S.S.I. 2023 No. 425)
- The A84 and A85 Trunk Road (Stirling Road, Callander) (Temporary Prohibition on Use of Road) Order 2021 (S.S.I. 2023 No. 426)
- The South West Scotland Trunk Roads (Temporary Prohibitions of Traffic and Overtaking and Temporary Speed Restrictions) (No. 9) Order 2021 (S.S.I. 2023 No. 427)
- The Transport (Scotland) Act 2019 (Commencement No. 4) Regulations 2021 (S.S.I. 2023 No. 428 (C. 30))
- The South East Scotland Trunk Roads (Temporary Prohibitions of Traffic and Overtaking and Temporary Speed Restrictions) (No. 11) Order 2021 (S.S.I. 2023 No. 429)
- The North West Scotland Trunk Roads (Temporary Prohibitions of Traffic and Overtaking and Temporary Speed Restrictions) (No. 11) Order 2021 (S.S.I. 2023 No. 430)
- The Scottish Road Works Commissioner (Imposition of Penalties) Amendment Regulations 2021 (S.S.I. 2023 No. 431)
- The Animal Products (Transitional Import Conditions) (Miscellaneous Amendment) (Scotland) Regulations 2021 (S.S.I. 2023 No. 432)
- The North East Scotland Trunk Roads (Temporary Prohibitions of Traffic and Overtaking and Temporary Speed Restrictions) (No. 11) Order 2021 (S.S.I. 2023 No. 433)
- Act of Sederunt (Rules of the Court of Session 1994 Amendment) (Miscellaneous) (No.2) 2021 (S.S.I. 2023 No. 434)
- The M8 (Newhouse to Easterhouse) M73 (Maryville to Mollinsburn) A8 (Newhouse to Bargeddie) A725 (Shawhead to Whistleberry) Trunk Roads (Temporary Prohibitions of Traffic and Overtaking and Temporary Speed Restrictions) (No. 4) Order 2021 (S.S.I. 2023 No. 435)
- The Representation of the People (Postal Voting for Local Government

Elections) (Scotland) Amendment Regulations 2021 (S.S.I. 2023 No. 436)

- The Scottish Local Government Elections Amendment Order 2021 (S.S.I. 2023 No. 437)
- The Ethical Standards in Public Life etc. (Scotland) Act 2000 (Register of Interests) Amendment (No. 2) Regulations 2021 (S.S.I. 2023 No. 438)
- The Coronavirus Act 2020 (Early Expiry of Provisions) (Scotland) Regulations 2021 (S.S.I. 2023 No. 439)
- The Health Protection (Coronavirus) (International Travel and Operator Liability) (Scotland) Amendment (No. 8) Regulations 2021 (revoked) (S.S.I. 2023 No. 440)
- (S.S.I. 2023 No. 441)
- (S.S.I. 2023 No. 442)
- The Health Protection (Coronavirus) (International Travel and Operator Liability) (Scotland) Amendment (No. 10) Regulations 2021 (revoked) (S.S.I. 2023 No. 443)
- The Avian Influenza (H5N1 in Birds etc.) (Miscellaneous Amendment and Revocation) (Scotland) Order 2021 (S.S.I. 2023 No. 444)
- The Valuation and Rating (Coronavirus) (Scotland) Order 2021 (revoked) (S.S.I. 2023 No. 445)
- The Prisons and Young Offenders Institutions (Scotland) Amendment Rules 2021 (S.S.I. 2023 No. 446)
- The Budget (Scotland) Act 2021 Amendment Regulations 2021 (S.S.I. 2023 No. 447)
- The First-tier Tribunal for Scotland (Chambers) Amendment Regulations 2021 (S.S.I. 2023 No. 448)
- The Age of Criminal Responsibility (Scotland) Act 2019 (Commencement No. 4) Regulations 2021 (S.S.I. 2023 No. 449 (C. 32))
- The A985 Trunk Road (Longannet) (Temporary Clearway) Order 2021 (S.S.I. 2023 No. 450)
- The A835/A893 Trunk Road (Ullapool) (Temporary Prohibition on Waiting, Loading and Unloading) Order 2021 (S.S.I. 2023 No. 451)
- Act of Sederunt (Summary Applications, Statutory Applications and Appeals etc. Rules 1999 and Sheriff Appeal Court Rules Amendment) (Age of Criminal Responsibility (Scotland) Act 2019) 2021 (S.S.I. 2023 No. 452)
- The Health Protection (Coronavirus) (Requirements) (Scotland) Amendment (No. 4) Regulations 2021 (S.S.I. 2023 No. 453)
- The Health Protection (Coronavirus) (International Travel and Operator Liability) (Scotland) Amendment (No. 11) Regulations 2021 (revoked) (S.S.I. 2023 No. 454)
- The Health Protection (Coronavirus) (International Travel and Operator Liability) (Scotland) Amendment (No. 12) Regulations 2021 (revoked) (S.S.I. 2023 No. 455)
- The Animal Health (Notification and Control Measures) (Miscellaneous Amendments) (Scotland) (No. 2) Order 2021 (S.S.I. 2023 No. 456)
- The Abortion (Scotland) Amendment Regulations 2021 (S.S.I. 2023 No. 457)
- The Scottish Dog Control Database Order 2021 (S.S.I. 2023 No. 458)
- The Relevant Adjustments to Common Parts (Disabled Persons) (Scotland) Amendment Regulations 2021 (S.S.I. 2023 No. 459)
- The Eggs (Amendment) (Scotland) Regulations 2021 (S.S.I. 2023 No. 460)
- The Civil Partnership (Supplementary Provisions relating to the Recognition of Overseas Dissolutions, Annulments or Separations) (Scotland) Amendment Regulations 2021 (S.S.I. 2023 No. 461)
- The Education (Miscellaneous Amendments) (Coronavirus) (Scotland) (No. 2) Regulations 2021 (S.S.I. 2023 No. 462)
- The Red Rocks and Longay Urgent Marine Conservation (No. 2) Order 2021 (S.S.I. 2023 No. 463)
- The Consumer Scotland Act 2020 (Commencement) Regulations 2021 (S.S.I. 2023 No. 464 (C. 33))
- The Consumer Scotland (Designated Regulators) Regulations 2021 (S.S.I. 2023 No. 465)
- The Conservation of Salmon (Scotland) Amendment Regulations 2021 (S.S.I. 2023 No. 466)
- The Sea Fish (Prohibited Methods of Fishing) (Firth of Clyde) Order 2021 (revoked) (S.S.I. 2023 No. 467)
- Act of Sederunt (Sheriff Appeal Court Rules) 2021 (S.S.I. 2023 No. 468)
- The Social Security (Period for Re-determination Requests) (Miscellaneous Amendments) (Scotland) Regulations 2021 (S.S.I. 2023 No. 469)
- The Public Health (Coronavirus) (International Travel and Operator Liability) (Scotland) Amendment (No. 13) Regulations 2021 (revoked) (S.S.I. 2023 No. 470)
- The Equality Act 2010 (Specification of Public Authorities) (Scotland) Order 2021 (S.S.I. 2023 No. 471)
- The Land Registration etc. (Scotland) Act 2012 (Commencement No. 3) Order 2021 (S.S.I. 2023 No. 472 (C. 34))
- The Equality Act 2010 (Specific Duties) (Scotland) Amendment Regulations 2021 (S.S.I. 2023 No. 473)
- The Social Security (Scotland) Act 2018 (Commencement No. 9) Regulations 2021 (S.S.I. 2023 No. 474 (C. 35))
- The Health Protection (Coronavirus) (Requirements) (Scotland) Amendment (No. 5) Regulations 2021 (S.S.I. 2023 No. 475)
- The Independent Reviewer (Modification of Functions) (Scotland) Regulations 2021 (S.S.I. 2023 No. 476)
- The Food (Withdrawal of Recognition) (Miscellaneous Amendments) (Scotland) Regulations 2021 (S.S.I. 2023 No. 477)
- The Health Protection (Coronavirus) (International Travel and Operator Liability) (Scotland) Amendment (No. 13) Regulations 2021 (revoked) (S.S.I. 2023 No. 478)
- The Redress for Survivors (Historical Child Abuse in Care) (Payments Materially Affected by Error) (Scotland) Regulations 2021 (S.S.I. 2023 No. 479)
- The Planning (Scotland) Act 2019 (Commencement No. 8) Regulations 2021 (S.S.I. 2023 No. 480 (C. 36))
- The Nutritional Requirements for Food and Drink in Schools (Scotland) Amendment Regulations 2021 (S.S.I. 2023 No. 481)
- The South East Scotland Trunk Roads (Temporary Prohibitions of Traffic and Overtaking and Temporary Speed Restrictions) (No. 12) Order 2021 (S.S.I. 2023 No. 482)
- The A702 Trunk Road (Biggar) (Temporary Prohibition on Use of Road) Order 2021 (S.S.I. 2023 No. 483)
- The A9 Trunk Road (Brora) (Temporary Prohibition On Use of Road) (No. 2) Order 2021 (S.S.I. 2023 No. 484)
- The North East Scotland Trunk Roads (Temporary Prohibitions of Traffic and Overtaking and Temporary Speed Restrictions) (No. 12) Order 2021 (S.S.I. 2023 No. 485)
- The A85 Trunk Road (Comrie) (Temporary Prohibition on Use of Road) (No. 4) Order 2021 (S.S.I. 2023 No. 486)
- The North West Scotland Trunk Roads (Temporary Prohibitions of Traffic and Overtaking and Temporary Speed Restrictions) (No. 12) Order 2021 (S.S.I. 2023 No. 487)
- The M8 (Newhouse to Easterhouse) M73 (Maryville to Mollinsburn) M74 (Daldowie to Hamilton) A8 (Newhouse to Bargeddie) A725 (Shawhead to Whistleberry) A7071 (Bellshill) Trunk Roads (Temporary Prohibitions of Traffic and Overtaking and Temporary Speed Restrictions) (No. 4) Order 2021 (S.S.I. 2023 No. 488)
- The Council Tax (Dwellings and Part Residential Subjects) (Scotland) Amendment Regulations 2021 (S.S.I. 2023 No. 489)
- The Plant Health (EU Exit) (Scotland) (Amendment) (No. 2) Regulations 2021 (S.S.I. 2023 No. 490)
- The A78 Trunk Road (Greenock) (Temporary Prohibition of Traffic) Order 2021 (S.S.I. 2023 No. 491)
- The Private Storage Aid Scheme (Pigmeat) (Scotland) Amendment Regulations 2021 (S.S.I. 2023 No. 492)
- The Official Controls (Transitional Staging Period) (Miscellaneous Amendments) (Scotland) (No. 3) Regulations 2021 (S.S.I. 2023 No. 493)
- The Best Start Grants and Scottish Child Payment (Miscellaneous Amendments) Regulations 2021 (S.S.I. 2023 No. 494)
- The Land Reform (Scotland) Act 2016 (Register of Persons Holding a Controlled Interest in Land) Amendment Regulations 2021 (S.S.I. 2023 No. 495)
- The Health Protection (Coronavirus) (Requirements) (Scotland) Amendment (No. 6) Regulations 2021 (S.S.I. 2023 No. 496)
- The Health Protection (Coronavirus) (Requirements) (Scotland) Amendment (No. 7) Regulations 2021 (S.S.I. 2023 No. 497)
- The Health Protection (Coronavirus) (Requirements) (Scotland) Amendment (No. 8) Regulations 2021 (S.S.I. 2023 No. 498)
- The A78 Trunk Road (Greenock) (Temporary Prohibition on Use of Road) Order 2021 (S.S.I. 2023 No. 499)
