= List of Scottish statutory instruments, 2019 =

This is a complete list of Scottish statutory instruments in 2019.

== 1-100 ==
- The Agricultural Holdings (Scotland) Act 1991 (Variation of Schedule 5) Order 2019 (S.S.I 2019 No. 1)
- The A82 Trunk Road (Tyndrum To South Ballachulish) (Temporary Rural Clearway) Order 2019 (S.S.I 2019 No. 2)
- The A90 Trunk Road (Aberdeen Western Peripheral Route) (Temporary Prohibitions and Restrictions) Amendment Order 2019 (S.S.I 2019 No. 3)
- The A956 Trunk Road (Aberdeen Western Peripheral Route) (Cleanhill to Charleston) (Temporary Prohibitions and Restrictions) Amendment Order 2019 (S.S.I 2019 No. 4)
- The Zootechnical Standards (Scotland) Regulations 2019 (S.S.I 2019 No. 5)
- The Licensing (Amendment) (EU Exit) (Scotland) Regulations 2019 (S.S.I 2019 No. 6)
- The Electronic Invoicing (Public Contracts etc.) Amendment (Scotland) Regulations 2019 (S.S.I 2019 No. 7)
- The Housing (Scotland) Act 1987 (Tolerable Standard) (Extension of Criteria) Order 2019 (S.S.I 2019 No. 8)
- The Aquatic Animal Health and Alien Species in Aquaculture (EU Exit) (Scotland) (Amendment) Regulations 2019 (revoked) (S.S.I 2019 No. 9)
- The A84 Trunk Road (Main Street, Callander) (Temporary Prohibition On Use Of Road) Order 2019 (S.S.I 2019 No. 10)
- The M9/A9 Trunk Road (Inveralmond to Birnam) (Temporary Prohibition of Traffic, Specified Turns, Overtaking and Speed Restrictions) Order 2019 (S.S.I 2019 No. 11)
- The National Assistance (Assessment of Resources) Amendment (Scotland) Regulations 2019 (revoked) (S.S.I 2019 No. 12)
- The National Assistance (Sums for Personal Requirements) (Scotland) Regulations 2019 (revoked) (S.S.I 2019 No. 13)
- The M8 (Newhouse to Easterhouse) M73 (Maryville to Mollinsburn) M74 (Daldowie to Hamilton) A725 (Shawhead to Whistleberry) Trunk Roads (Temporary Prohibitions of Traffic and Overtaking and Temporary Speed Restrictions) Order 2019 (S.S.I 2019 No. 14)
- The North East Scotland Trunk Roads (Temporary Prohibitions of Traffic and Overtaking and Temporary Speed Restrictions) Order 2019 (S.S.I 2019 No. 15)
- The North West Scotland Trunk Roads (Temporary Prohibitions of Traffic and Overtaking and Temporary Speed Restrictions) Order 2019 (S.S.I 2019 No. 16)
- The South East Scotland Trunk Roads (Temporary Prohibitions of Traffic and Overtaking and Temporary Speed Restrictions) Order 2019 (S.S.I 2019 No. 17)
- The South West Scotland Trunk Roads (Temporary Prohibitions of Traffic and Overtaking and Temporary Speed Restrictions) Order 2019 (S.S.I 2019 No. 18)
- The A956 Trunk Road (Aberdeen Western Peripheral Route) (Cleanhill to Charleston) (Temporary Prohibitions and Restrictions) Amendment (No. 2) Order 2019 (S.S.I 2019 No. 19)
- The A90 Trunk Road (Aberdeen Western Peripheral Route) (Temporary Prohibitions and Restrictions) Amendment (No. 2) Order 2019 (S.S.I 2019 No. 20)
- The Carer's Allowance Up-rating (Scotland) Regulations 2019 (S.S.I 2019 No. 21)
- Act of Sederunt (Computer Evidence in the Sheriff Court) (Revocation) 2019 (S.S.I 2019 No. 22)
- The Local Governance (Scotland) Act 2004 (Remuneration) Amendment Regulations 2019 (S.S.I 2019 No. 23)
- The Fisheries (EU Exit) (Scotland) (Amendment) Regulations 2019 (S.S.I 2019 No. 24)
- The Fertilisers and Pesticides (EU Exit) (Scotland) (Miscellaneous Amendments etc.) Regulations 2019 (S.S.I 2019 No. 25)
- The Environment (EU Exit) (Scotland) (Amendment etc.) Regulations 2019 (S.S.I 2019 No. 26)
- The Personal Injuries (NHS Charges) (Amounts) (Scotland) Amendment Regulations 2019 (S.S.I 2019 No. 27)
- The Plant Health (Import Inspection Fees) (Scotland) Amendment Regulations 2019 (S.S.I 2019 No. 28)
- The Council Tax Reduction (Scotland) Amendment Regulations 2019 (S.S.I 2019 No. 29)
- The Equine Animal (Identification) (Scotland) Regulations 2019 (S.S.I 2019 No. 30)
- The A9 Trunk Road (Scrabster) (Temporary Prohibition on Use of Road) Order 2019 (S.S.I 2019 No. 31)
- The Materials and Articles in Contact with Food (Scotland) Amendment Regulations 2019 (S.S.I 2019 No. 32)
- The Food Standards and Hygiene (Miscellaneous Amendments) (Scotland) Regulations 2019 (S.S.I 2019 No. 33)
- The Animal Welfare (EU Exit) (Scotland) (Amendment) Regulations 2019 (S.S.I 2019 No. 34)
- The Non-Domestic Rate (Scotland) Order 2019 (S.S.I 2019 No. 35)
- The Cremation (Scotland) Regulations 2019 (S.S.I 2019 No. 36)
- The Wildlife and Countryside Act 1981 (Keeping and Release and Notification Requirements) (Scotland) Amendment Order 2019 (S.S.I 2019 No. 37)
- The Wildlife and Countryside Act 1981 (Prohibition on Sale etc. of Invasive Animal and Plant Species) (Scotland) Order 2019 (S.S.I 2019 No. 38)
- The Non-Domestic Rates (Levying) (Scotland) Regulations 2019 (revoked) (S.S.I 2019 No. 39)
- The Non-Domestic Rates (Relief for New and Improved Properties) (Scotland) Regulations 2019 (revoked) (S.S.I 2019 No. 40)
- The Non-Domestic Rates (Telecommunication Installations) (Scotland) Amendment Regulations 2019 (S.S.I 2019 No. 41)
- The Non-Domestic Rating (Telecommunications New Fibre Infrastructure) (Scotland) Order 2019 .(S.S.I. 2019 No. 42)
- The Non-Domestic Rates (Telecommunications New Fibre Infrastructure Relief) (Scotland) Regulations 2019 (S.S.I 2019 No. 43)
- The Non-Domestic Rates (Transitional Relief) (Scotland) Amendment Regulations 2019 (S.S.I 2019 No. 44)
- The Non-Domestic Rating (Valuation of Utilities) (Scotland) Amendment Order 2019 (S.S.I 2019 No. 45)
- The National Health Service Superannuation and Pension Schemes (Scotland) (Miscellaneous Amendments) Regulations 2019 S.S.I 2019 No. 46)
- The Forestry and Land Management (Scotland) Act 2018 (Commencement, Transitional and Saving Provisions) Regulations 2019 (S.S.I 2019 No. 47 (C. 1))
- The Teachers' Superannuation and Pension Scheme (Scotland) (Miscellaneous Amendments) Regulations 2019 (S.S.I 2019 No. 48)
- The Felling (Scotland) Regulations 2019 (S.S.I 2019 No. 49)
- The National Health Service (Optical Charges and Payments) (Scotland) Amendment Regulations 2019 (S.S.I 2019 No. 50)
- The First-tier Tribunal for Scotland Housing and Property Chamber (Incidental Provisions) Regulations 2019 (S.S.I 2019 No. 51)
- The Food and Feed Safety and Hygiene (EU Exit) (Scotland) (Amendment) Regulations 2019 (S.S.I 2019 No. 52)
- The Food Composition, Labelling and Standards (EU Exit) (Scotland) (Amendment) Regulations 2019 (S.S.I 2019 No. 53)
- The Nutrition (EU Exit) (Scotland) (Amendment) Regulations 2019 (S.S.I 2019 No. 54)
- The Marine Environment (EU Exit) (Scotland) (Amendment) Regulations 2019 (S.S.I 2019 No. 55)
- The Conservation of Salmon (Scotland) Amendment Regulations 2019 (S.S.I 2019 No. 56)
- The Genetically Modified Organisms (EU Exit) (Scotland) (Amendment) Regulations 2019 (S.S.I 2019 No. 57)
- The Scottish Landfill Tax (Standard Rate and Lower Rate) Order 2019 (revoked) (S.S.I 2019 No. 58)
- The Seed and Propagating Material (EU Exit) (Scotland) (Amendment) Regulations 2019 (S.S.I 2019 No. 59)
- The Common Agricultural Policy (EU Exit) (Scotland) (Amendment) Regulations 2019 (S.S.I 2019 No. 60)
- The Housing (Scotland) Act 2006 (Modification of the Repairing Standard) Regulations 2019 (S.S.I 2019 No. 61)
- The Housing (Scotland) Act 2006 (Supplemental Provision) Order 2019 (S.S.I 2019 No. 62)
- The M8 (Newhouse to Easterhouse), M73 (Maryville to Mollinsburn), A8 (Newhouse to Bargeddie) and A725 (Shawhead to Whistleberry) Trunk Roads (Temporary Prohibitions of Traffic and Overtaking and Temporary Speed Restrictions) Order 2019 (S.S.I 2019 No. 63)
- The Conservation (Natural Habitats, &c.) Amendment (Scotland) Regulations 2019 (S.S.I 2019 No. 64)
- The North East Scotland Trunk Roads (Temporary Prohibitions of Traffic and Overtaking and Temporary Speed Restrictions) (No. 2) Order 2019 (S.S.I 2019 No. 65)
- The North West Scotland Trunk Roads (Temporary Prohibitions of Traffic and Overtaking and Temporary Speed Restrictions) (No. 2) Order 2019 (S.S.I 2019 No. 66)
- The South East Scotland Trunk Roads (Temporary Prohibitions of Traffic and Overtaking and Temporary Speed Restrictions) (No. 2) Order 2019 (S.S.I 2019 No. 67)
- The Police Pensions (Miscellaneous Amendments) (Scotland) Regulations 2019 (S.S.I 2019 No. 68)
- The Fisheries (EU Exit) (Scotland) (Amendment) (No. 2) Regulations 2019 (S.S.I 2019 No. 69)
- The Education (Fees and Student Support) (Miscellaneous Amendments) (EU Exit) (Scotland) Regulations 2019 (S.S.I 2019 No. 70)
- The Animal Health (EU Exit) (Scotland) (Amendment) Regulations 2019 (S.S.I 2019 No. 71)
- Act of Sederunt (Rules of the Court of Session 1994 Amendment) (Sanctions and Anti-Money Laundering) 2019 (S.S.I 2019 No. 72)
- The Agriculture Market Measures (EU Exit) (Scotland) (Amendment) Regulations 2019 (S.S.I 2019 No. 73)
- Act of Sederunt (Rules of the Court of Session, Sheriff Appeal Court Rules and Ordinary Cause Rules Amendment) (Taxation of Judicial Expenses) 2019 (S.S.I 2019 No. 74)
- Act of Sederunt (Taxation of Judicial Expenses Rules) 2019 (S.S.I 2019 No. 75)
- The Stornoway Port Authority Harbour Revision Order 2019 (S.S.I 2019 No. 76)
- The Non-Domestic Rating (Valuation of Utilities) (Scotland) Amendment (No. 2) Order 2019 (S.S.I 2019 No. 77)
- The Legal Aid and Advice and Assistance (Scotland) (Miscellaneous Amendments) Regulations 2019 (S.S.I 2019 No. 78)
- The Sheriff Court Simple Procedure (Limits on Award of Expenses) Amendment Order 2019 (S.S.I 2019 No. 79)
- The Town and Country Planning and Electricity Works (EU Exit) (Scotland) (Miscellaneous Amendments) Regulations 2019 (S.S.I 2019 No. 80)
- Act of Sederunt (Rules of the Court of Session 1994 and Sheriff Court Rules Amendment) (Miscellaneous) 2019 (S.S.I 2019 No. 81)
- The Community Care (Personal Care and Nursing Care) (Scotland) Amendment Regulations 2019 (revoked) (S.S.I 2019 No. 82)
- The Drug Driving (Specified Limits) (Scotland) Regulations 2019 (S.S.I 2019 No. 83)
- The Wildlife and Countryside Act 1981 (EU Exit) (Scotland) (Amendment) Regulations 2019 (S.S.I 2019 No. 84)
- Act of Sederunt (Rules of the Court of Session 1994 Amendment) (Regulation (EC) No. 44/2001) (Transitional Provisions) 2019 (S.S.I 2019 No. 85)
- The Genetically Modified Organisms (Deliberate Release etc.) (Miscellaneous Amendments) (Scotland) Regulations 2019 (S.S.I 2019 No. 86)
- The Sea Fish Licensing (Foreign Vessels) (EU Exit) (Scotland) Order 2019 (revoked) (S.S.I 2019 No. 87)
- The Sea Fishing (Licences and Notices) (EU Exit) (Scotland) (Amendment) Regulations 2019 (revoked) (S.S.I 2019 No. 88)
- The Agriculture Market Measures (EU Exit) (Scotland) (Amendment) Amendment Regulations 2019 (S.S.I 2019 No. 89)
- The Local Government Finance (Scotland) Order 2019 (S.S.I 2019 No. 90)
- The Continuing Care (Scotland) Amendment Order 2019 (S.S.I 2019 No. 91)
- The Chief Forester (Qualifications) (Scotland) Regulations 2019 (S.S.I 2019 No. 92)
- The Social Security (Ireland) (Further provision in respect of Scotland) Order 2019 (S.S.I 2019 No. 93)
- The Insolvency (EU Exit) (Scotland) (Amendment) Regulations 2019 (S.S.I 2019 No. 94)
- The Teachers’ Superannuation and Pension Scheme (Scotland) (Miscellaneous Amendments) Amendment Regulations 2019 (S.S.I 2019 No. 95)
- The Scottish Road Works Register (Prescribed Fees) Regulations 2019 (revoked) (S.S.I 2019 No. 96)
- Act of Sederunt (Rules of the Court of Session 1994 Amendment) (Sanctions and Anti-Money Laundering) (No.2) 2019 (S.S.I 2019 No. 97)
- The Less Favoured Area Support Scheme (Scotland) Amendment Regulations 2019 (S.S.I 2019 No. 98)
- The Air Weapons and Licensing (Scotland) Act 2015 (Commencement No. 9 and Transitional Provisions) Order 2019 (S.S.I 2019 No. 99 (C. 2))
- The Fishery Products (Official Controls Charges) (EU Exit) (Scotland) (Amendment) Regulations 2019 (S.S.I 2019 No. 100)

== 101-200 ==
- The Loch Carron Marine Conservation Order 2019 (S.S.I 2019 No. 101)
- The Carer's Allowance Up-rating (Scotland) Order 2019 (S.S.I 2019 No. 102
- The INSPIRE (EU Exit) (Scotland) (Amendment) Regulations 2019 (S.S.I 2019 No. 103)
- The Jurisdiction and Judgments (Family, Civil Partnership and Marriage (Same Sex Couples)) (EU Exit) (Scotland) (Amendment etc.) Regulations 2019 (S.S.I 2019 No. 104)
- The M8 (Newhouse to Easterhouse) M73 (Maryville to Mollinsburn) M74 (Daldowie to Hamilton) A8 (Newhouse to Bargeddie) A725 (Shawhead to Whistleberry) A7071 (Bellshill) Trunk Roads (Temporary Prohibitions of Traffic and Overtaking and Temporary Speed Restrictions) Order 2019 (S.S.I 2019 No. 105)
- The North West Scotland Trunk Roads (Temporary Prohibitions of Traffic and Overtaking and Temporary Speed Restrictions) (No. 3) Order 2019 (S.S.I 2019 No. 106)
- The North East Scotland Trunk Roads (Temporary Prohibitions of Traffic and Overtaking and Temporary Speed Restrictions) (No. 3) Order 2019 (S.S.I 2019 No. 107)
- The South West Scotland Trunk Roads (Temporary Prohibitions of Traffic and Overtaking and Temporary Speed Restrictions) (No. 2) Order 2019 (S.S.I 2019 No. 108)
- The South East Scotland Trunk Roads (Temporary Prohibitions of Traffic and Overtaking and Temporary Speed Restrictions) (No. 3) Order 2019 (S.S.I 2019 No. 109)
- The Early Years Assistance (Best Start Grants) (Scotland) Amendment (No. 1) Regulations 2019 (S.S.I 2019 No. 110)
- The Asset Transfer Request (Designation of Relevant Authority) (Scotland) Order 2019 (S.S.I 2019 No. 111)
- The Public Procurement etc. (Scotland) (Amendment) (EU Exit) Regulations 2019 (revoked) (S.S.I 2019 No. 112)
- The Conservation (Natural Habitats, &c.) (EU Exit) (Scotland) (Amendment) Regulations 2019 (S.S.I 2019 No. 113)
- The Public Procurement etc. (Scotland) (Amendment) (EU Exit) Amendment Regulations 2019 (revoked) (S.S.I 2019 No. 114)
- The A737 (The Den, Dalry) (Temporary Prohibitions of Traffic and Overtaking and Temporary 40 mph Speed Restriction) Order 2019 (S.S.I 2019 No. 115)
- The Non-Domestic Rates (Relief for New and Improved Properties) (Scotland) Amendment Regulations 2019 (S.S.I 2019 No. 116)
- The Budget (Scotland) Act 2018 Amendment Regulations 2019 (S.S.I 2019 No. 117)
- The Transmissible Spongiform Encephalopathies (Scotland) Amendment Regulations 2019 (S.S.I 2019 No. 118)
- The National Bus Travel Concession Scheme for Older and Disabled Persons (Scotland) Amendment Order 2019 (S.S.I 2019 No. 119)
- The South West Scotland Trunk Roads (Temporary Prohibitions of Traffic and Overtaking and Temporary Speed Restrictions) (No. 3) Order 2019 (S.S.I 2019 No. 120)
- The Carbon Accounting Scheme (Scotland) Amendment Regulations 2019 (S.S.I 2019 No. 121)
- Act of Sederunt (Simple Procedure Amendment) (Civil Online) 2019 (S.S.I 2019 No. 122)
- Act of Sederunt (Rules of the Court of Session 1994 and Ordinary Cause Rules 1993 Amendment) (Views of the Child) 2019 (S.S.I 2019 No. 123)
- The Plant Health (EU Exit) (Scotland) (Amendment etc.) Regulations 2019 (revoked) (S.S.I 2019 No. 124)
- The Forestry and Land Management (Scotland) Act 2018 (Consequential Amendments) Regulations 2019 (S.S.I 2019 No. 125)
- The Forestry (Exemptions) (Scotland) Regulations 2019 (S.S.I 2019 No. 126)
- The Services of Lawyers and Lawyer's Practice (EU Exit) (Scotland) (Amendment etc.) Regulations 2019 (S.S.I 2019 No. 127)
- The Disabled Persons (Badges for Motor Vehicles) (EU Exit) (Scotland) (Amendment) Regulations 2019 (S.S.I 2019 No. 128)
- The A76 Trunk Road (Enterkinfoot to Thornhill) (Stopping Up) Order 2019 (S.S.I 2019 No. 129)
- The Forestry (EU Exit) (Scotland) (Amendment etc.) Regulations 2019 (S.S.I 2019 No. 130)
- The Cross-border Health Care (EU Exit) (Scotland) (Amendment etc.) Regulations 2019 (S.S.I 2019 No. 131)
- The A83 Trunk Road (Campbeltown) (Temporary Prohibition on Use of Road, Waiting, Loading and Unloading) Order 2019 (S.S.I 2019 No. 132)
- The Council Tax Reduction (Scotland) Amendment (No. 2) Regulations 2019 (S.S.I 2019 No. 133)
- The Islands (Scotland) Act 2018 (Commencement No. 2) Regulations 2019 (S.S.I 2019 No. 134 (C. 3))
- The A84 Trunk Road (Cambusmore) (Temporary Prohibition on Use of Road and Temporary 30 mph Speed Restriction) Order 2019 (S.S.I 2019 No. 135)
- The Lerwick Harbour Revision (Constitution) Order 2019 (S.S.I 2019 No. 136)
- The A82 Trunk Road (Crianlarich) (Temporary 30 mph Speed Restriction) Order 2019 (S.S.I 2019 No. 137)
- The Motor Sport on Public Roads (Scotland) Regulations 2019 (S.S.I 2019 No. 138)
- Act of Adjournal (Criminal Procedure Rules 1996 Amendment) (Labour Market Enforcement Orders) 2019 (S.S.I 2019 No. 139)
- Act of Sederunt (Summary Applications, Statutory Applications and Appeals etc. Rules Amendment) (Labour Market Enforcement Orders) 2019 (S.S.I 2019 No. 140)
- The A9 Berriedale Braes (Temporary Prohibitions of Traffic and Overtaking and Temporary 30 mph Speed Restriction) Order 2019 (S.S.I 2019 No. 141)
- The Public Health and Tobacco (EU Exit) (Scotland) (Amendment) Regulations 2019 (S.S.I 2019 No. 142)
- The Freedom of Information (Scotland) Act 2002 (Designation of Persons as Scottish Public Authorities) Order 2019 (S.S.I 2019 No. 143)
- The St Mary's Music School (Aided Places) (Scotland) Amendment Regulations 2019 (S.S.I 2019 No. 144)
- The National Health Service (Free Prescriptions and Charges for Drugs and Appliances) (Scotland) Amendment Regulations 2019 (revoked) (S.S.I 2019 No. 145)
- Act of Sederunt (Rules of the Court of Session 1994 and Summary Applications, Statutory Applications and Appeals etc. Rules 1999 Amendment) (Proceeds of Crime) 2019 (S.S.I 2019 No. 146)
- Act of Sederunt (Rules of the Court of Session 1994 and Child Care and Maintenance Rules 1997 Amendment) (Parental Orders) 2019 (S.S.I 2019 No. 147)
- The M8 (Newhouse to Easterhouse) M73 (Maryville to Mollinsburn) M74 (Daldowie to Hamilton) A725 (Shawhead to Whistleberry) Scotland Trunk Roads (Temporary Prohibitions of Traffic and Overtaking and Temporary Speed Restrictions) (No. 2) Order 2019 (S.S.I 2019 No. 148)
- The International Joint Investigation Teams (International Agreements) (EU Exit) (Scotland) Order 2019 (S.S.I 2019 No. 149)
- The A85 Trunk Road (Oban) (Temporary Prohibition on Use of Road) Order 2019 (S.S.I 2019 No. 150)
- The South West Scotland Trunk Roads (Temporary Prohibitions of Traffic and Overtaking and Temporary Speed Restrictions) (No. 4) Order 2019 (S.S.I 2019 No. 151)
- The South East Scotland Trunk Roads (Temporary Prohibitions of Traffic and Overtaking and Temporary Speed Restrictions) (No. 4) Order 2019 (S.S.I 2019 No. 152)
- The North West Scotland Trunk Roads (Temporary Prohibitions of Traffic and Overtaking and Temporary Speed Restrictions) (No. 4) Order 2019 (S.S.I 2019 No. 153)
- The North East Scotland Trunk Roads (Temporary Prohibitions of Traffic and Overtaking and Temporary Speed Restrictions) (No. 4) Order 2019 (S.S.I 2019 No. 154)
- The A83 Trunk Road (Inveraray) (Temporary Prohibition on Waiting, Loading and Unloading) Order 2019 (S.S.I 2019 No. 155)
- The A85 Trunk Road (Comrie) (Temporary Prohibition on Use of Road) Order 2019 (S.S.I 2019 No. 156)
- The Early Years Assistance (Best Start Grants) (Scotland) Amendment (No. 2) Regulations 2019 (S.S.I 2019 No. 157)
- The A68 Trunk Road (Newtown St Boswells) (Redetermination of Means of Exercise of Public Right of Passage) Order 2019 (S.S.I 2019 No. 158)
- The Road Works (Qualifications of Operatives and Supervisors) (Scotland) Amendment Regulations 2019 (S.S.I 2019 No. 159)
- The Private Landlord Registration (Fees) (Scotland) Regulations 2019 (S.S.I 2019 No. 160)
- The Local Government Pension Scheme (Miscellaneous Amendments) (Scotland) Regulations 2019 (S.S.I 2019 No. 161)
- The A68 Trunk Road (Edinburgh Road, Jedburgh) (Temporary Prohibition of Waiting and Temporary 30 mph Speed Restriction) Order 2019 (S.S.I 2019 No. 162)
- The Abertay University (Scotland) Order of Council 2019 (S.S.I 2019 No. 163)
- The M8/A8 Trunk Road (Craigton to St James Interchange) (Temporary Vehicle Width Restriction) Order 2019 (S.S.I. 2019 No. 164)
- The A702 Trunk Road (Penicuik Rideout) (Temporary Prohibition on Use of Road) Order 2019 (S.S.I 2019 No. 165)
- The A90 Trunk Road (Aberdeen Western Peripheral Route) (Stonehaven to Blackdog) (Prohibitions and Restrictions) Regulations 2019 (S.S.I 2019 No. 166)
- The A956 Trunk Road (Aberdeen Western Peripheral Route) (Cleanhill to Charleston) (Prohibitions and Restrictions) Regulations 2019 (S.S.I 2019 No. 167)
- The Motorways Traffic (Scotland) Amendment Regulations 2019 (S.S.I 2019 No. 168)
- The Marketing of Horticultural Produce and Bananas (EU Exit) (Scotland) (Amendment) Regulations 2019 (S.S.I 2019 No. 169)
- The Scottish Crown Estate Act 2019 (Commencement No. 1) Regulations 2019 (S.S.I 2019 No. 170 (C. 4))
- The Justice of the Peace Courts (Sheriffdom of South Strathclyde, Dumfries and Galloway) etc. Amendment Order 2019 (S.S.I 2019 No. 171)
- The Title Conditions (Scotland) Act 2003 (Rural Housing Bodies) Amendment Order 2019 (S.S.I 2019 No. 172)
- The Public Procurement etc. (Miscellaneous Amendments) (Scotland) Regulations 2019 (S.S.I 2019 No. 173)
- The National Health Service (General Dental Services) (Scotland) Amendment Regulations 2019 (S.S.I 2019 No. 174)
- The Environment (EU Exit) (Miscellaneous Amendments) (Scotland) Regulations 2019 (S.S.I 2019 No. 175)
- The Electricity (Applications for Consent and Variation of Consent) (Fees) (Scotland) Regulations 2019 (S.S.I 2019 No. 176)
- The Licensing (Personal Licences: Supplemental and Transitional Provision) (Scotland) Order 2019 (S.S.I 2019 No. 177)
- The Environmental Assessment (EU Exit) (Scotland) (Amendment) Regulations 2019 (S.S.I 2019 No. 178)
- The Education (Scotland) Act 1980 (Modification) Regulations 2019 (S.S.I 2019 No. 179)
- The Companies Act 2006 (Scottish public sector companies to be audited by the Auditor General for Scotland) Order 2019 (S.S.I 2019 No. 180)
- The Energy Act 2011 (Commencement No. 2) (Scotland) Order 2019 (S.S.I 2019 No. 181 (C. 5))
- The A876 Trunk Road (Kincardine Bridge) (Temporary Prohibition of Specified Turns and Temporary Prohibition on Use of Road) Order 2019 (S.S.I 2019 No. 182)
- The A737 Trunk Road (Dalry Bypass) (Temporary Prohibitions of Traffic and Overtaking and Temporary 40 mph Speed Restriction) Order 2019 (S.S.I 2019 No. 183)
- The Public Appointments and Public Bodies etc. (Scotland) Act 2003 (Treatment of South of Scotland Enterprise as Specified Authority) Order 2019 (S.S.I 2019 No. 184)
- The M8 (Newhouse to Easterhouse), M73 (Maryville to Mollinsburn), A8 (Newhouse to Bargeddie) and A725 (Shawhead to Whistleberry) Trunk Roads (Temporary Prohibitions of Traffic and Overtaking and Temporary Speed Restrictions) (No. 2) Order 2019 (S.S.I 2019 No. 185)
- The South East Scotland Trunk Roads (Temporary Prohibitions of Traffic and Overtaking and Temporary Speed Restrictions) (No. 5) Order 2019 (S.S.I 2019 No. 186)
- The North East Scotland Trunk Roads (Temporary Prohibitions of Traffic and Overtaking and Temporary Speed Restrictions) (No. 5) Order 2019 (S.S.I 2019 No. 187)
- The North West Scotland Trunk Roads (Temporary Prohibitions of Traffic and Overtaking and Temporary Speed Restrictions) (No. 5) Order 2019 (S.S.I 2019 No. 188)
- The A87 Trunk Road (Portree to Prabost) (Temporary Prohibition On Use of Road) Order 2019 (S.S.I 2019 No. 189)
- The Seed and Propagating Material (EU Exit) (Scotland) (Amendment) (No. 2) Regulations 2019 (S.S.I 2019 No. 190)
- The National Assistance (Assessment of Resources) Amendment (Scotland) (No. 2) Regulations 2019 (S.S.I 2019 No. 191)
- The A9 Trunk Road (Scrabster) (Temporary Prohibition on Use of Road) (No. 2) Order 2019 (S.S.I 2019 No. 192)
- The Welfare Foods (Best Start Foods) (Scotland) Regulations 2019 (S.S.I 2019 No. 193)
- The A78 Trunk Road (Fairlie) (30 mph Speed Limit) Order 2019 (S.S.I 2019 No. 194)
- The Private Landlord Registration (Information) (Scotland) Regulations 2019 (S.S.I 2019 No. 195)
- The A96 Trunk Road (Lhanbryde) (Temporary Prohibition on Use of Road and Temporary 30 mph and 20 mph Speed Restrictions) Order 2019 (S.S.I 2019 No. 196)
- The Damages (Investment Returns and Periodical Payments) (Scotland) Act 2019 (Commencement No. 1) Regulations 2019 (S.S.I 2019 No. 197 (C. 6))
- The A7 Trunk Road (Muckle Toon Half Marathon and 10k) (Temporary Prohibition on Use of Road) Order 2019 (S.S.I 2019 No. 198)
- The A78 Trunk Road (Inverkip Road, Greenock) (Temporary Prohibition of Specified Turns) Order 2019 (S.S.I 2019 No. 199)
- The A85 Trunk Road (Oban) (Temporary Prohibition on Use of Road) (No. 2) Order 2019 (S.S.I 2019 No. 200)

== 201-300 ==
- The A83 Trunk Road (Poltalloch Street, Lochgilphead) (Temporary Prohibition on Use of Road) Order 2019 (S.S.I 2019 No. 201)
- The A96 Trunk Road (Alves) (Temporary Prohibition on Use of Road and Temporary 30 mph and 20 mph Speed Restrictions) Order 2019 (S.S.I 2019 No. 202)
- The A96 Trunk Road (Fochabers) (Temporary Prohibition on Use of Road and Temporary 30 mph and 20 mph Speed Restrictions) Order 2019 (S.S.I 2019 No. 203)
- The Local Government Pension Scheme (Miscellaneous Amendments) (Scotland) Amendment Regulations 2019 (S.S.I 2019 No. 204)
- The Historical Sexual Offences (Pardons and Disregards) (Scotland) Act 2018 (Commencement) Regulations 2019 (S.S.I 2019 No. 205 (C. 7))
- The Children and Young People (Scotland) Act 2014 (Modification) (No. 1) Order 2019 (S.S.I 2019 No. 206)
- The Children and Young People (Scotland) Act 2014 (Modification) (No. 2) Order 2019 (revoked) (S.S.I 2019 No. 207)
- The A96 Trunk Road (Nairn) (Temporary Prohibition on Use of Road and Temporary 20 mph Speed Restriction) Order 2019 (S.S.I 2019 No. 208)
- The Common Agricultural Policy (EU Exit) (Scotland) (Amendment) (No. 2) Regulations 2019 (S.S.I 2019 No. 209)
- The Building (Scotland) Amendment Regulations 2019 (S.S.I 2019 No. 210)
- The Welfare of Farmed Animals (Scotland) Amendment Regulations 2019 (S.S.I 2019 No. 211)
- The University of the West of Scotland Order of Council 2019 (S.S.I 2019 No. 212)
- The Queen Margaret University, Edinburgh (Scotland) Amendment Order of Council 2019 (S.S.I 2019 No. 213)
- Not Allocated (S.S.I 2019 No. 214)
- The A85 Trunk Road (Comrie) (Temporary Prohibition on Use of Road) (No. 2) Order 2019 (S.S.I 2019 No. 215)
- The Private Housing (Tenancies) (Scotland) Act 2016 (Modification of Schedule 1) Regulations 2019 (S.S.I 2019 No. 216)
- The Head Teachers Education and Training Standards (Scotland) Regulations 2019 (S.S.I 2019 No. 217)
- The A956 Trunk Road (Aberdeen Western Peripheral Route) (Cleanhill to Charleston) (40 mph Speed Limit) Order 2019 (S.S.I 2019 No. 218)
- The A90 Trunk Road (Aberdeen Western Peripheral Route and Balmedie to Tipperty) (Stonehaven to Tipperty) (Prohibition, 30 mph and 40 mph Speed Limit) Order 2019 (S.S.I 2019 No. 219)
- The A92 Trunk Road (Stonehaven to Charleston) (Prohibition and 40 mph Speed Limit) Order 2019 (S.S.I 2019 No. 220)
- The A83 Trunk Road (Tarbert) (30 mph Speed Limit) Order 2019 (S.S.I 2019 No. 221)
- The North East Scotland Trunk Roads (Temporary Prohibitions of Traffic and Overtaking and Temporary Speed Restrictions) (No. 6) Order 2019 (S.S.I. 2019 No. 222)
- The North West Scotland Trunk Roads (Temporary Prohibitions of Traffic and Overtaking and Temporary Speed Restrictions) (No. 6) Order 2019 (S.S.I. 2019 No. 223)
- The South East Scotland Trunk Roads (Temporary Prohibitions of Traffic and Overtaking and Temporary Speed Restrictions) (No. 6) Order 2019 (S.S.I. 2019 No. 224)
- The South West Scotland Trunk Roads (Temporary Prohibitions of Traffic and Overtaking and Temporary Speed Restrictions) (No. 5) Order 2019 (S.S.I. 2019 No. 225)
- The M8/A8 Trunk Road (Edinburgh to Greenock) (Temporary Prohibition of Specified Turns and Temporary Prohibition on Use of Road) Order 2019 (S.S.I 2019 No. 226)
- Act of Sederunt (Rules of the Court of Session 1994 Amendment) (Court Sittings) 2019 (S.S.I 2019 No. 227)
- The A77 Trunk Road (Maybole Bypass) (Temporary Prohibitions of Traffic and Overtaking and Temporary Speed Restrictions) Order 2019 (S.S.I 2019 No. 228)
- Not Allocated (S.S.I 2019 No. 229)
- The Removal, Storage and Disposal of Vehicles (Prescribed Sums and Charges etc.) (Scotland) Regulations 2019 (S.S.I 2019 No. 230)
- The Police (Retention and Disposal of Motor Vehicles) (Scotland) Amendment Regulations 2019 (S.S.I 2019 No. 231)
- The Welfare Foods (Best Start Foods) (Scotland) Amendment Regulations 2019 (S.S.I 2019 No. 232)
- The M8 (Newhouse to Easterhouse) M73 (Maryville to Mollinsburn) M74 (Daldowie to Hamilton) A8 (Newhouse to Bargeddie) A725 (Shawhead to Whistleberry) A7071 (Bellshill) Trunk Roads (Temporary Prohibitions of Traffic and Overtaking and Temporary Speed Restrictions) (No. 2) Order 2019 (S.S.I 2019 No. 233)
- The A83 Trunk Road (Barmore Road, Tarbert) (Temporary Prohibition On Use of Road) Order 2019 (S.S.I 2019 No. 234)
- The A9 Trunk Road (Glassingall, Dunblane) (Temporary Prohibition of Specified Turns) Order 2019 (S.S.I 2019 No. 235)
- The Presumption Against Short Periods of Imprisonment (Scotland) Order 2019 (S.S.I 2019 No. 236)
- The A83 Trunk Road (Ardrishaig) (Temporary Prohibition on Use of Road) Order 2019 (S.S.I 2019 No. 237)
- The A83 Trunk Road (Inveraray) (Temporary Prohibition On Use Of Road) Order 2019 (S.S.I 2019 No. 238)
- The A83 Trunk Road (Campbeltown) (Temporary Prohibition on Use of Road, Waiting, Loading and Unloading) (No. 2) Order 2019 (S.S.I 2019 No. 239)
- The A83 Trunk Road (Tarbert) (Temporary Prohibition On Use of Road) Order 2019 (S.S.I 2019 No. 240)
- The A85 Trunk Road (Taynuilt) (Temporary Prohibition on Use of Road) Order 2019 (S.S.I 2019 No. 241)
- The Plant Health (Miscellaneous Amendments) (Scotland) Order 2019 (revoked) (S.S.I 2019 No. 242)
- The A85 Trunk Road (Comrie) (Temporary Prohibition on Use of Road) (No. 3) Order 2019 (S.S.I 2019 No. 243)
- The A85 Trunk Road (Dunira Street, Comrie) (Temporary Prohibition on Waiting, Loading and Unloading) Order 2019 (S.S.I 2019 No. 244)
- The A702 Trunk Road (Gas Works Road, Biggar) (Temporary Prohibition on Use of Road) Order 2019 (S.S.I 2019 No. 245)
- The A85 Trunk Road (Lochearnhead) (Temporary Prohibition on Use of Road) Order 2019 (S.S.I 2019 No. 246)

*Act of Sederunt (Rules of the Court of Session 1994 and Sheriff Court Company Insolvency Rules Amendment) (Insolvency) 2019  (S.S.I 2019 No. 247)

- The A83 Trunk Road (Furnace to Cumlodden) (40 mph Speed Limit) Order 2019 (S.S.I 2019 No. 248)
- The North East Scotland Trunk Roads (Temporary Prohibitions of Traffic and Overtaking and Temporary Speed Restrictions) (No. 7) Order 2019 (S.S.I 2019 No. 249)
- The North West Scotland Trunk Roads (Temporary Prohibitions of Traffic and Overtaking and Temporary Speed Restrictions) (No. 7) Order 2019 (S.S.I 2019 No. 250)
- The South East Scotland Trunk Roads (Temporary Prohibitions of Traffic and Overtaking and Temporary Speed Restrictions) (No. 7) Order 2019 (S.S.I 2019 No. 251)
- The South West Scotland Trunk Roads (Temporary Prohibitions of Traffic and Overtaking and Temporary Speed Restrictions) (No. 6) Order 2019 (S.S.I 2019 No. 252)
- The A7 Trunk Road (Hawick) (40 mph Speed Limit) Order 2019 (S.S.I 2019 No. 253)
- The A86 Trunk Road (Aberarder) (Temporary Prohibition of Traffic) Order 2019 (S.S.I 2019 No. 254)
- The A82 Trunk Road (Glencoe and Bridge Of Orchy) (Temporary 30 mph Speed Restriction) Order 2019 (S.S.I 2019 No. 255)

*The M8 (Newhouse to Easterhouse) M73 (Maryville to Mollinsburn) M74 (Daldowie to Hamilton) A725 (Shawhead to Whistleberry) Scotland Trunk Roads (Temporary Prohibitions of Traffic and Overtaking and Temporary Speed Restrictions) (No. 3) Order 2019  (S.S.I 2019 No. 256)

- The M8/A8 Trunk Road (Bay Street, Port Glasgow) (Prohibition of Specified Turns) Order 2019 (S.S.I 2019 No. 257)
- The M90/A90 Trunk Road (Tealing) (Temporary Prohibition of Specified Turns) Order 2019 (S.S.I 2019 No. 258)
- The A76 Trunk Road (Mauchline) (Temporary Prohibition on Waiting, Loading and Unloading) Order 2019 (S.S.I 2019 No. 259)
- The A84 and A85 Trunk Roads (Kilmahog to Perth) (Temporary Prohibition on Use of Road) Order 2019 (S.S.I 2019 No. 260)
- The Representation of the People Act 1983 Remedial (Scotland) Order 2019 (revoked) (S.S.I 2019 No. 261)
- The A77 Trunk Road (Ballantrae) (Temporary Prohibition on Waiting, Loading and Unloading) Order 2019 (S.S.I 2019 No. 262)
- The M8 (Newhouse to Easterhouse), M73 (Maryville to Mollinsburn), A8 (Newhouse to Bargeddie) and A725 (Shawhead to Whistleberry) Trunk Roads (Temporary Prohibitions of Traffic and Overtaking and Temporary Speed Restrictions) (No. 3) Order 2019 (S.S.I 2019 No. 263)
- The M9/A9 Trunk Road (Solheim Cup) (Temporary Prohibition on Use of Road, of Waiting and Specified Turns and Temporary 50 mph and 30 mph Speed Restrictions) Order 2019 (S.S.I 2019 No. 264)
- The M9/A9 Trunk Road (Denmarkfield Farm, Luncarty) (Temporary Prohibition of Specified Turns) Order 2019 (S.S.I 2019 No. 265)
- The South East Scotland Trunk Roads (Temporary Prohibitions of Traffic and Overtaking and Temporary Speed Restrictions) (No. 8) Order 2019 (S.S.I 2019 No. 266)
- The North West Scotland Trunk Roads (Temporary Prohibitions of Traffic and Overtaking and Temporary Speed Restrictions) (No. 8) Order 2019 (S.S.I 2019 No. 267)
- The North East Scotland Trunk Roads (Temporary Prohibitions of Traffic and Overtaking and Temporary Speed Restrictions) (No. 8) Order 2019 (S.S.I 2019 No. 268)
- The Social Security (Scotland) Act 2018 (Commencement No. 5, Revocation and Saving Provision) Regulations 2019 (S.S.I 2019 No. 269 (C. 8))
- The M8/A8 Trunk Road (Baillieston to Bargeddie) (Temporary Prohibition On Use of Road) Order 2019 (S.S.I 2019 No. 270)
- The Environmental Protection (Cotton Buds) (Scotland) Regulations 2019 (S.S.I 2019 No. 271)
- The A9 Trunk Road (Scrabster) (Temporary Prohibition on Use of Road) (No. 3) Order 2019 (S.S.I 2019 No. 272)
- The Management of Extractive Waste (EU Exit) (Scotland) (Miscellaneous Amendments) Regulations 2019 (S.S.I 2019 No. 273)
- The Town and Country Planning and Electricity Works (EU Exit) (Scotland) (Miscellaneous Amendments) Amendment Regulations 2019 (S.S.I 2019 No. 274)
- The A85 Trunk Road (Perth) (Temporary Prohibition on Use of Road) Order 2019 (S.S.I 2019 No. 275)
- The Environmental Liability etc. (EU Exit) (Scotland) (Amendment) Regulations 2019 (S.S.I 2019 No. 276)
- The Fuel Poverty (Targets, Definition and Strategy) (Scotland) Act 2019 (Commencement No. 1) Regulations 2019 (S.S.I 2019 No. 277 (C. 9))
- The Plant Health (Forestry) Amendment (Scotland) Order 2019 (S.S.I 2019 No. 278)
- The A78 Trunk Road (Wemyss Bay) (Temporary Prohibition on Waiting, Loading and Unloading) Order 2019 (S.S.I 2019 No. 279)
- The Enforcement of Fines (Relevant Penalty) (Scotland) Order 2019 (S.S.I 2019 No. 280)
- The Serious Crime Act 2015 (Commencement No. 2) (Scotland) Regulations 2019 (S.S.I 2019 No. 281 (C. 10))
- The Victim Surcharge Fund (Prescribed Relatives) (Scotland) Regulations 2019 (S.S.I 2019 No. 282 )
- The Victims and Witnesses (Scotland) Act 2014 (Commencement No. 5) Order 2019 (S.S.I 2019 No. 283 (C. 11))
- The National Health Service (Serious Shortage Protocols) (Miscellaneous Amendments) (Scotland) Regulations 2019 (S.S.I 2019 No. 284)
- The Food Information, Labelling and Standards (EU Exit) (Scotland) (Amendment) Regulations 2019 (S.S.I 2019 No. 285)
- The A725/A726 Trunk Road (East Kilbride) (Temporary 30 mph Speed Restriction) Order 2019 (S.S.I 2019 No. 286)
- The A977 Trunk Road (Kincardine) (Temporary Prohibition on Waiting, Loading and Unloading) Order 2019 (S.S.I 2019 No. 287)
- The Animal Health and Welfare and Official Controls (Animals, Feed and Food) (EU Exit) (Scotland) (Amendment) Regulations 2019 (S.S.I 2019 No. 288)
- The Seed, Propagating Material and Common Agricultural Policy (EU Exit) (Scotland) (Amendment) Regulations 2019 (S.S.I 2019 No. 289)
- The Plant Health (Scotland) Amendment Order 2019 (revoked) (S.S.I 2019 No. 290)
- The A85 Trunk Road (Laggan Park to Bridge Street, Comrie) (Temporary Prohibition On Waiting, Loading and Unloading) Order 2019 (S.S.I 2019 No. 291)
- The Funeral Expense Assistance (Scotland) Regulations 2019 (S.S.I 2019 No. 292)
- Act of Sederunt (Rules of the Court of Session 1994 Amendment) (Signature of Petitions and Answers) 2019 (S.S.I 2019 No. 293)
- The A82 Trunk Road (Glencoe) (Temporary Prohibition on Use of Road and 30 mph Speed Restriction) Order 2019 (S.S.I 2019 No. 294)
- The Caravan Sites Act 1968 (Amendment of Definition of Caravan) (Scotland) Order 2019 (S.S.I 2019 No. 295)
- The Caledonian Maritime Assets (East Loch Tarbert) Harbour Revision Order 2019 (S.S.I 2019 No. 296)
- Not Allocated (S.S.I 2019 No. 297)
- The A725 Trunk Road (Raith) (Prohibition of Specified Classes of Traffic and Pedestrians) Order 2019 (S.S.I 2019 No. 298)
- The North East Scotland Trunk Roads (Temporary Prohibitions of Traffic and Overtaking and Temporary Speed Restrictions) (No. 9) Order 2019 (S.S.I 2019 No. 299)
- The North West Scotland Trunk Roads (Temporary Prohibitions of Traffic and Overtaking and Temporary Speed Restrictions) (No. 9) Order 2019 (S.S.I 2019 No. 300)

== 301-393 ==
- The South East Scotland Trunk Roads (Temporary Prohibitions of Traffic and Overtaking and Temporary Speed Restrictions) (No. 9) Order 2019 (S.S.I 2019 No. 301)
- The M8 (Newhouse to Easterhouse) M73 (Maryville to Mollinsburn) M74 (Daldowie to Hamilton) A8 (Newhouse to Bargeddie) A725 (Shawhead to Whistleberry) A7071 (Bellshill) Trunk Roads (Temporary Prohibitions of Traffic and Overtaking and Temporary Speed Restrictions) (No. 3) Order 2019 (S.S.I 2019 No. 302)
- The South West Scotland Trunk Roads (Temporary Prohibitions of Traffic and Overtaking and Temporary Speed Restrictions) (No. 7) Order 2019 (S.S.I 2019 No. 303)
- The Regulatory Reform (Specification of EU Instruments) (Scotland) Order 2019 (revoked) (S.S.I 2019 No. 304)
- The Human Tissue (Authorisation) (Scotland) Act 2019 (Commencement No. 1) Regulations 2019 (S.S.I 2019 No. 305 (C. 12))
- The A96 Trunk Road (Keith) (Temporary Prohibition on Use of Road and Temporary 30 mph and 20 mph Speed Restrictions) Order 2019 (S.S.I 2019 No. 306)
- The A96 Trunk Road (Skares) (Temporary Prohibition on Use of Road and Temporary 30 mph and 20 mph Speed Restrictions) Order 2019 (S.S.I 2019 No. 307)
- The South of Scotland Enterprise Act 2019 (Commencement and Transitional Provision) Regulations 2019 (S.S.I 2019 No. 308 (C. 13))
- The Management of Offenders (Scotland) Act 2019 (Commencement No. 1, Saving and Transitional Provisions) Regulations 2019 (S.S.I 2019 No. 309 (C. 14))
- The Bovine Viral Diarrhoea (Scotland) Order 2019 (S.S.I 2019 No. 310)
- The A725 Trunk Road (Raith) (Temporary Prohibition of Specified Classes of Traffic and Pedestrians) Revocation Order 2019 (S.S.I 2019 No. 311)
- The M8 Motorway (Junction 29A Off Slip Road) (40 mph Speed Limit) Regulations 2019 (S.S.I 2019 No. 312)
- The Historical Sexual Offences (Disregarded Convictions and Official Records) (Scotland) Regulations 2019 (S.S.I 2019 No. 313)
- The Planning (Scotland) Act 2019 (Commencement No. 1) Regulations 2019 (S.S.I 2019 No. 314 (C. 15) )
- The Debt Arrangement Scheme (Scotland) Amendment Regulations 2019 (S.S.I 2019 No. 315)
- The Homelessness etc. (Scotland) Act 2003 (Commencement No. 4) Order 2019 (S.S.I 2019 No. 316 (C. 16))
- The Social Security (Iceland) (Liechtenstein) (Norway) (Citizens’ Rights Agreement) (Further provision in respect of Scotland) Order 2019 (S.S.I 2019 No. 317)
- The Social Security (Switzerland) (Citizens’ Rights Agreement) (Further provision in respect of Scotland) Order 2019 (S.S.I 2019 No. 318)
- The A737 Trunk Road (New Street, Dalry) (Temporary Prohibition on Waiting, Loading and Unloading) Order 2019 (S.S.I 2019 No. 319)
- The Conservation (Natural Habitats, &c.) Amendment (No. 2) (Scotland) Regulations 2019 (S.S.I 2019 No. 320)
- Act of Adjournal (Criminal Procedure Rules 1996 Amendment) (Miscellaneous) 2019 (S.S.I 2019 No. 321)
- The Environmental Impact Assessment (Transport) (Scotland) Regulations 2019 (S.S.I 2019 No. 322)
- The M8/A8 Trunk Road (Starlaw to Heartlands) (Temporary Weight Restriction) Order 2019 (S.S.I 2019 No. 323)
- The Carer's Assistance (Young Carer Grants) (Scotland) Regulations 2019 (S.S.I 2019 No. 324)
- The Council Tax Reduction (Scotland) Amendment (No. 3) Regulations 2019 (S.S.I 2019 No. 325)
- The A702 Trunk Road (Biggar) (Temporary Prohibition on Use of Road) Order 2019 (S.S.I 2019 No. 326)
- Additional Powers Request (Scotland) Regulations 2019 (SSI 2019/327)
- Act of Sederunt (Challenges to Validity of EU Instruments (EU Exit) in the Court of Session) 2019 (S.S.I 2019 No. 328)
- Act of Sederunt (Challenges to Validity of EU Instruments (EU Exit) in the Sheriff Appeal Court and Sheriff Court) 2019 (S.S.I 2019 No. 329)
- Act of Adjournal (Criminal Procedure Rules 1996 Amendment) (Challenges to Validity of EU Instruments (EU Exit)) 2019 (S.S.I 2019 No. 330)
- The Tenancy Deposit Schemes (Scotland) Amendment Regulations 2019 (S.S.I 2019 No. 331)
- The Environmental Protection Act 1990 Amendment (Scotland) Regulations 2019 (S.S.I 2019 No. 332)
- The National Health Service (Charges to Overseas Visitors) (Scotland) (Amendment) (EU Exit) Regulations 2019 (S.S.I 2019 No. 333)
- The M8 (Newhouse to Easterhouse) M73 (Maryville to Mollinsburn) M74 (Daldowie to Hamilton) A725 (Shawhead to Whistleberry) Scotland Trunk Roads (Temporary Prohibitions of Traffic and Overtaking and Temporary Speed Restrictions) (No. 4) Order 2019 (S.S.I 2019 No. 334)
- The A78 Trunk Road (Largs) (Temporary Prohibition on Waiting, Loading and Unloading) Order 2019 (S.S.I 2019 No. 335)
- The Public Health Scotland Order 2019 (S.S.I 2019 No. 336)
- The A9 Trunk Road (Glassingall, Dunblane) (Temporary Prohibition of Specified Turns) (No. 2) Order 2019 (S.S.I 2019 No. 337)
- The North West Scotland Trunk Roads (Temporary Prohibitions of Traffic and Overtaking and Temporary Speed Restrictions) (No. 10) Order 2019 (S.S.I 2019 No. 338)
- The North East Scotland Trunk Roads (Temporary Prohibitions of Traffic and Overtaking and Temporary Speed Restrictions) (No. 10) Order 2019 (S.S.I 2019 No. 339)
- The South West Scotland Trunk Roads (Temporary Prohibitions of Traffic and Overtaking and Temporary Speed Restrictions) (No. 8) Order 2019 (S.S.I 2019 No. 340)
- The South East Scotland Trunk Roads (Temporary Prohibitions of Traffic and Overtaking and Temporary Speed Restrictions) (No. 10) Order 2019 (S.S.I 2019 No. 341)
- The A83 Trunk Road (Lochgilphead) (Temporary Prohibition on Use of Road) Order 2019 (S.S.I 2019 No. 342)
- The A83 Trunk Road (Campbeltown) (Temporary Prohibition on Use of Road, Waiting, Loading and Unloading) (No. 3) Order 2019 (S.S.I 2019 No. 343)
- The A85 Trunk Road (Crieff) (Temporary Prohibition on Use of Road) Order 2019 (S.S.I 2019 No. 344)
- The Fishing Boats Designation (EU Exit) (Scotland) Order 2019 (revoked) (S.S.I 2019 No. 345)
- The Scottish Dental Practice Board Amendment Regulations 2019 (S.S.I 2019 No. 346)
- The Agriculture Market Measures (EU Exit) (Scotland) (Amendment) (No. 2) Regulations 2019 (S.S.I 2019 No. 347)
- The Scottish Tribunals (Listed Tribunals) Regulations 2019 (S.S.I 2019 No. 348)
- The Age of Criminal Responsibility (Scotland) Act 2019 (Commencement No. 1 and Transitory Provision) Regulations 2019 (S.S .I 2019 No. 349 (C. 17))
- The A96 Trunk Road (Church Road, Keith) (Temporary Prohibition of Traffic) Order 2019 (S.S.I 2019 No. 350)
- The A85 Trunk Road (Taynuilt) (Temporary Prohibition on Use of Road) (No. 2) Order 2019 (S.S.I 2019 No. 351)
- The A83 Trunk Road (Inveraray) (Temporary Prohibition on Use of Road) (No. 2) Order 2019 (S.S.I 2019 No. 352)
- The A68 Trunk Road (Edinburgh to Carter Bar) (Temporary Prohibition On Use Of Road) Order 2019 (S.S.I 2019 No. 353)
- The A84 Trunk Road (Callander) (Temporary Prohibition on Use of Road) Order 2019 (S.S.I 2019 No. 354)
- The A83 Trunk Road (Cairndow) (Temporary Prohibition On Use of Road) Order 2019 (S.S.I 2019 No. 355)
- The Waste (Miscellaneous Amendments) (Scotland) Regulations 2019 (S.S.I 2019 No. 356)
- The Firefighters’ Pension Scheme (Scotland) Amendment Regulations 2019 (S.S.I 2019 No. 357)
- The Firefighters’ Pension Schemes (Scotland) Amendment Order 2019 (S.S.I 2019 No. 358)
- The Provision of Early Learning and Childcare (Specified Children) (Scotland) Amendment Order 2019 (S.S.I 2019 No. 359)
- The A84/A85 Trunk Road (Lochearnhead) (Temporary Prohibition on Use of Road) Order 2019 (S.S.I 2019 No. 360)
- The A84 Trunk Road (Doune) (Temporary Prohibition on Use of Road) Order 2019 (S.S.I 2019 No. 361)
- The A9 Trunk Road (Brora) (Temporary Prohibition on Use of Road) Order 2019 (S.S.I 2019 No. 362)
- The Criminal Justice (Scotland) Act 2016 (Commencement No. 6 and Transitional Provision) Order 2019 (S.S.I 2019 No. 363 (C. 18))
- The Conservation (Natural Habitats, &c.) (Miscellaneous Amendments) (Scotland) Regulations 2019 (S.S.I 2019 No. 364)
- The A83 Trunk Road (Tarbert) (Temporary Prohibition on Use of Road) (No. 2) Order 2019 (S.S.I 2019 No. 365)
- The A83 Trunk Road (Arrochar) (Temporary Prohibition on Use of Road) Order 2019 (S.S.I 2019 No. 366)
- The A83 Trunk Road (Campbeltown) (Temporary Prohibition on Use of Road) Order 2019 (S.S.I 2019 No. 367)
- The A85 Trunk Road (Comrie) (Temporary Prohibition on Use of Road) (No. 4) Order 2019 (S.S.I 2019 No. 368)
- The A83 Trunk Road (Ardrishaig) (Temporary Prohibition on Use of Road) (No. 2) Order 2019 (S.S.I 2019 No. 369)
- The A87 Trunk Road (Balmacara) (Temporary Prohibition on Use of Road) Order 2019 (S.S.I 2019 No. 370)
- The M9/A9 Trunk Road (Thurso) (Temporary Prohibition on Use of Road) Order 2019 (S.S.I 2019 No. 371)
- The A78 Trunk Road (Inverkip) (Temporary Prohibition on Use of Road) Order 2019 (S.S.I 2019 No. 372)
- The A702 Trunk Road (Biggar) (Temporary Prohibition on Use of Road) (No. 2) Order 2019 (S.S.I 2019 No. 373)
- The M9/A9 Trunk Road (Seaforth Road, Golspie) (Temporary Prohibition on Use of Road) Order 2019 (S.S.I 2019 No. 374)
- The Robert Gordon University (Scotland) Order of Council 2019 (S.S.I 2019 No. 375)
- The A83 Trunk Road (Poltalloch Street, Lochgilphead) (Temporary Prohibition on Use of Road) (No. 2) Order 2019 (S.S.I 2019 No. 376)
- The Planning (Scotland) Act 2019 (Commencement No. 2, Saving and Transitional Provisions) Regulations 2019 (S.S.I 2019 No. 377 (C. 19))
- The A85 Trunk Road (Oban) (Temporary Prohibition on Use of Road) (No. 3) Order 2019 (S.S.I 2019 No. 378)
- The M9/A9 Trunk Road (Craigrory) (Temporary Prohibition of Specified Turns) Order 2019 (S.S.I 2019 No. 379)
- The Police Pensions Amendment (Increased Pension Entitlement) (Scotland) Regulations 2019 (S.S.I 2019 No. 380)
- The Firefighters’ Pension Scheme Amendment (Increased Pension Entitlement) (Scotland) Order 2019 (S.S.I 2019 No. 381)
- The Firefighters’ Pension and Compensation Schemes (Amendment) (Scotland) Order 2019 (S.S.I 2019 No. 382)
- The A83 Trunk Road (Kinloch Road, Campbeltown) (Temporary Prohibition on Use of Road) Order 2019 (S.S.I 2019 No. 383)
- The Scottish Tribunals (Eligibility for Appointment) Amendment Regulations 2019 (S.S.I 2019 No. 384)
- The Planning (Scotland) Act 2019 (Commencement No. 3) Regulations 2019 (S.S.I 2019 No. 385 (C. 20))
- The A85 Trunk Road (Comrie) (Temporary Prohibition on Use of Road) (No. 5) Order 2019 (S.S.I 2019 No. 386)
- The Victim Surcharge (Scotland) Regulations 2019 (S.S.I 2019 No. 387)
- The Victims and Witnesses (Scotland) Act 2014 (Supplementary Provision) Order 2019 (S.S.I 2019 No. 388)
- The A85 Trunk Road (Oban) (Temporary Prohibition on Use of Road) (No. 4) Order 2019 (S.S.I 2019 No. 389)
- The Proceeds of Crime Act 2002 (Investigations: Code of Practice) (Scotland) Order 2019 (S.S.I 2019 No. 390)
- The A77 Trunk Road (Girvan) (Temporary One-Way Traffic) Order 2019 (S.S.I 2019 No. 391)
- The Vulnerable Witnesses (Criminal Evidence) (Scotland) Act 2019 (Commencement No. 1 and Transitional Provisions) Regulations 2019 (S.S.I 2019 No. 392 (C. 21))
- The Charities Accounts (Scotland) Amendment Regulations 2019 (S.S.I 2019 No. 393)
- The A77 Trunk Road (Girvan) (Temporary Prohibition On Use Of Road) Order 2019 (S.S.I 2019 No. 394)
- The M8 (Newhouse to Easterhouse), M73 (Maryville to Mollinsburn), A8 (Newhouse to Bargeddie) and A725 (Shawhead to Whistleberry) Trunk Roads (Temporary Prohibitions of Traffic and Overtaking and Temporary Speed Restrictions) (No. 4) Order 2019 (S.S.I 2019 No. 395)
- The Rehabilitation of Offenders Act 1974 (Exclusions and Exceptions) (Scotland) Amendment Order 2019 (S.S.I 2019 No. 396)
- The A84 Trunk Road (Callander) (Temporary Prohibition on Use of Road) (No. 2) Order 2019 (S.S.I 2019 No. 397)
- The A82 Trunk Road (Fort William) (Temporary Prohibition on Use of Road) Order 2019 (S.S.I 2019 No. 398)
- The A83 Trunk Road (Inveraray) (Temporary Prohibition on Use of Road) (No. 3) Order 2019 (S.S.I 2019 No. 399)
- The North West Scotland Trunk Roads (Temporary Prohibitions of Traffic and Overtaking and Temporary Speed Restrictions) (No. 11) Order 2019 (S.S.I 2019 No. 400)

== 400-438 ==
- The South East Scotland Trunk Roads (Temporary Prohibitions of Traffic and Overtaking and Temporary Speed Restrictions) (No. 11) Order 2019 (S.S.I 2019 No. 401)
- The Budget (Scotland) Act 2019 Amendment Regulations 2019 (S.S.I 2019 No. 402)
- The North East Scotland Trunk Roads (Temporary Prohibitions of Traffic and Overtaking and Temporary Speed Restrictions) (No. 11) Order 2019 (S.S.I 2019 No. 403)
- Act of Sederunt (Rules of the Court of Session 1994 Amendment) (Case Management of Certain Personal Injuries Actions) 2019 (S.S.I 2019 No. 404)
- Act of Sederunt (Rules of the Court of Session 1994 and Summary Applications, Statutory Applications and Appeals etc. Rules 1999 Amendment) (Proceeds of Crime) (No. 2) 2019 (S.S.I 2019 No. 405)
- The Social Security (Scotland) Act 2018 (Commencement No. 2, Transitory and Saving Provision and Commencement No. 4 and Saving Provision) Amendment Regulations 2019 (S.S.I 2019 No. 406)
- The Official Feed and Food Controls (Miscellaneous Amendments) (Scotland) Regulations 2019 (S.S.I 2019 No. 407)
- The Representation of the People Act 1983 Remedial (Scotland) Revocation Order 2019 (S.S.I 2019 No. 408)
- The A9 Trunk Road (Scrabster) (Temporary Prohibition on Use of Road) (No. 4) Order 2019 (S.S.I 2019 No. 409)
- The Planning (Scotland) Act (Actual Dates) Regulations 2019 (S.S.I 2019 No. 410)
- The Planning (Scotland) Act 2019 (Commencement No. 2, Saving and Transitional Provisions) Amendment Regulations 2019 (S.S.I 2019 No. 411)
- The Official Controls (Agriculture etc.) (Scotland) Regulations 2019 (S.S.I 2019 No. 412)
- The Management of Offenders (Scotland) Act 2019 (Commencement No. 2) Regulations 2019 (S.S.I 2019 No. 413 (C. 22))
- The Public Procurement etc. (Scotland) (Amendment) (EU Exit) Amendment (No. 2) Regulations 2019 (revoked) (S.S.I 2019 No. 414)
- The Environmental Impact Assessment (Transport) (EU Exit) (Scotland) (Amendment) Regulations 2019 (S.S.I 2019 No. 415)
- The Official Statistics (Scotland) Amendment Order 2019 (S.S.I 2019 No. 416)
- The Management of Offenders (Scotland) Act 2019 (Commencement No. 3 and Transitory Provision) Regulations 2019 (S.S.I 2019 No. 417 (C. 23))
- The Renfrewshire Council River Clyde Opening Bridge Scheme 2018 Confirmation Instrument 2019 (S.S.I 2019 No. 418)
- The Sea Fish (Prohibited Methods of Fishing) (Firth of Clyde) Order 2019 (revoked) (S.S.I 2019 No. 419)
- The Land Reform (Scotland) Act 2016 (Commencement No. 9) Regulations 2019 (S.S.I 2019 No. 420 (C. 24))
- The Plant Health (Official Controls and Miscellaneous Provisions) (Scotland) Regulations 2019 (S.S.I 2019 No. 421)
- The A702 Trunk Road (Biggar) (Temporary Prohibition on Use of Road) (No. 3) Order 2019 (S.S.I 2019 No. 422)
- The Restriction of Liberty Order etc. (Scotland) Amendment Regulations 2019 (S.S.I 2019 No. 423)
- The Planning (Scotland) Act 2019 (Ancillary Provision) Regulations 2019 (S.S.I 2019 No. 424)
- The Plant Health (Import Inspection Fees) (Scotland) Amendment (No. 2) Regulations 2019 (S.S.I 2019 No. 425)
- The Conservation of Salmon (Scotland) Amendment (No. 2) Regulations 2019 (S.S.I 2019 No. 426)
- The Electricity Works (Environmental Impact Assessment) (Scotland) Amendment Regulations 2019 (S.S.I 2019 No. 427)
- The Transport (Scotland) Act 2019 (Commencement No. 1) Regulations 2019 (S.S.I 2019 No. 428 (C. 25))
- The A9 Trunk Road (Brora) (Temporary Prohibition on Use of Road) (No. 2) Order 2019 (S.S.I 2019 No. 429)
- The A85 Trunk Road (Comrie) (Temporary Prohibition on Use of Road) (No. 6) Order 2019 (S.S.I 2019 No. 430)
- The M8 (Newhouse to Easterhouse) M73 (Maryville to Mollinsburn) M74 (Daldowie to Hamilton) A8 (Newhouse to Bargeddie) A725 (Shawhead to Whistleberry) A7071 (Bellshill) Trunk Roads (Temporary Prohibitions of Traffic and Overtaking and Temporary Speed Restrictions) (No. 4) Order 2019 (S.S.I 2019 No. 431)
- The North East Scotland Trunk Roads (Temporary Prohibitions of Traffic and Overtaking and Temporary Speed Restrictions) (No. 12) Order 2019 (S.S.I 2019 No. 432)
- The North West Scotland Trunk Roads (Temporary Prohibitions of Traffic and Overtaking and Temporary Speed Restrictions) (No. 12) Order 2019 (S.S.I 2019 No. 433)
- The South East Scotland Trunk Roads (Temporary Prohibitions of Traffic and Overtaking and Temporary Speed Restrictions) (No. 12) Order 2019 (S.S.I 2019 No. 434)
- The South West Scotland Trunk Roads (Temporary Prohibitions of Traffic and Overtaking and Temporary Speed Restrictions) (No. 9) Order 2019 (S.S.I 2019 No. 435)
- The Environment (EU Exit) (Scotland) (Amendment etc.) (No. 2) Regulations 2019 (S.S.I 2019 No. 436)
- The Criminal Justice (Scotland) Act 2016 (Support for Vulnerable Persons) Regulations 2019 (S.S.I 2019 No. 437)
- The Local Government Pension Scheme (Increased Pension Entitlement) (Miscellaneous Amendments) (Scotland) Regulations 2019 (S.S.I 2019 No. 438)
