= List of Scottish statutory instruments, 2023 =

This is a complete list of Scottish statutory instruments in 2023.

== 1–100 ==
- The A76 Trunk Road (Sanquhar) (Temporary Prohibition on Waiting, Loading and Unloading) Order 2023 (S.S.I. 2023 No. 1)
- The Budget (Scotland) Act 2022 Amendment Regulations 2023 (S.S.I. 2023 No. 2)
- The Coronavirus (Recovery and Reform) (Scotland) Act 2022 (Commencement No. 2) Regulations 2023 (S.S.I. 2023 No. 3 (C. 1))
- The Registration of Births, Still-births, Deaths and Marriages (Prescription of Forms) (Scotland) Amendment Regulations 2023 (S.S.I. 2023 No. 4)
- The A702 Trunk Road (Westwater Bridge) (Temporary Prohibition on Use of Road, Temporary Weight Restriction and Temporary 30 mph Speed Restriction) Order 2023 (S.S.I. 2023 No. 5)
- The First-tier Tribunal for Scotland Housing and Property Chamber (Amendment) Regulations 2023 (S.S.I. 2023 No. 6)
- The Packaging Waste (Data Reporting) (Scotland) Regulations 2023 (S.S.I. 2023 No. 7)
- The Cost of Living (Tenant Protection) (Scotland) Act 2022 (Early Expiry and Suspension of Provisions) Regulations 2023 (S.S.I. 2023 No. 8)
- The Bankruptcy and Debt Arrangement Scheme (Miscellaneous Amendment) (Scotland) Regulations 2023 (S.S.I. 2023 No. 9)
- The Planning (Scotland) Act 2019 (Commencement No. 11 and Saving and Transitional Provisions) Regulations 2023 (S.S.I. 2023 No. 10 (C. 2))
- The Legal Aid and Advice and Assistance (Miscellaneous Amendment) (Scotland) Regulations 2023 (S.S.I. 2023 No. 11)
- The North East Scotland Trunk Roads (Temporary Prohibitions of Traffic and Overtaking and Temporary Speed Restrictions) Order 2023 (S.S.I. 2023 No. 12)
- The North West Scotland Trunk Roads (Temporary Prohibitions of Traffic and Overtaking and Temporary Speed Restrictions) Order 2023 (S.S.I. 2023 No. 13)
- The South West Scotland Trunk Roads (Temporary Prohibitions of Traffic and Overtaking and Temporary Speed Restrictions) Order 2023 (S.S.I. 2023 No. 14)
- The South East Scotland Trunk Roads (Temporary Prohibitions of Traffic and Overtaking and Temporary Speed Restrictions) Order 2023 (S.S.I. 2023 No. 15)
- The Winter Heating Assistance (Low Income) (Scotland) Regulations 2023 (S.S.I. 2023 No. 16)
- The Human Trafficking and Exploitation (Scotland) Act 2015 (Commencement No. 5) Regulations 2023 (S.S.I. 2023 No. 17 (C. 3))
- The Human Trafficking and Exploitation (Independent Child Trafficking Guardians) (Scotland) Regulations 2023 (S.S.I. 2023 No. 18)
- The National Assistance (Assessment of Resources) Amendment (Scotland) Regulations 2023 (S.S.I. 2023 No. 19)
- The National Assistance (Sums for Personal Requirements) (Scotland) Regulations 2023 (S.S.I. 2023 No. 20)
- The Local Governance (Scotland) Act 2004 (Remuneration) Amendment Regulations 2023 (S.S.I. 2023 No. 21)
- The A84 Trunk Road (Main Street, Callander) (Temporary Prohibition on Use of Road) Order 2023 (S.S.I. 2023 No. 22)
- The M8 (Newhouse to Easterhouse) M73 (Maryville to Mollinsburn) M74 (Daldowie to Hamilton) A725 (Shawhead to Whistleberry) Trunk Roads (Temporary Prohibitions of Traffic and Overtaking and Temporary Speed Restrictions) Order 2023 (S.S.I. 2023 No. 23)
- The Public Health Scotland Amendment Order 2023 (S.S.I. 2023 No. 24)
- The Council Tax (Discounts) (Scotland) Amendment Order 2023 (S.S.I. 2023 No. 25)
- The Non-Domestic Rating (Valuation of Sites of Reverse Vending Machines) (Scotland) Regulations 2023 (S.S.I. 2023 No. 26)
- The Diligence against Earnings (Variation) (Scotland) Regulations 2023 (S.S.I. 2023 No. 27)
- The Non-Domestic Rates (Restriction of Relief) (Scotland) Regulations 2023 (S.S.I. 2023 No. 28)
- The Non-Domestic Rate (Scotland) Order 2023 (S.S.I. 2023 No. 29)
- The Non-Domestic Rates (Levying and Miscellaneous Amendment) (Scotland) Regulations 2023 (S.S.I. 2023 No. 30)
- The Non-Domestic Rates (Transitional Relief) (Scotland) Regulations 2023 (S.S.I. 2023 No. 31)
- The Valuation for Rating (Plant and Machinery) (Scotland) Amendment Regulations 2023 (S.S.I. 2023 No. 32)
- The Road Works (Reinstatement Quality Plans, Qualifications of Supervisors and Operatives and Miscellaneous Amendments) (Scotland) Regulations 2023 (S.S.I. 2023 No. 33)
- The Personal Injuries (NHS Charges) (Amounts) (Scotland) Amendment Regulations 2023 (S.S.I. 2023 No. 34)
- The Town and Country Planning (General Permitted Development and Use Classes) (Scotland) Miscellaneous Amendment Order 2023 (S.S.I. 2023 No. 35)
- The Council Tax (Exempt Dwellings) (Scotland) Amendment Order 2023 (S.S.I. 2023 No. 36)
- The Education (Scotland) Act 1980 (Modification) Regulations 2023 (S.S.I. 2023 No. 37)
- The Council Tax Reduction and Council Tax (Discounts) (Miscellaneous Amendment) (Scotland) Regulations 2023 (S.S.I. 2023 No. 38)
- The Sexual Offences Act 2003 (Prescribed Police Stations) (Scotland) Amendment Regulations 2023 (S.S.I. 2023 No. 39)
- The First-tier Tribunal for Scotland Local Taxation Chamber and Upper Tribunal for Scotland (Rules of Procedure) (Miscellaneous Amendment) Regulations 2023 (S.S.I. 2023 No. 40)
- The North East Scotland Trunk Roads (Temporary Prohibitions of Traffic and Overtaking and Temporary Speed Restrictions) (No. 2) Order 2023 (S.S.I. 2023 No. 41)
- The North West Scotland Trunk Roads (Temporary Prohibitions of Traffic and Overtaking and Temporary Speed Restrictions) (No. 2) Order 2023 (S.S.I. 2023 No. 42)
- The South East Scotland Trunk Roads (Temporary Prohibitions of Traffic and Overtaking and Temporary Speed Restrictions) (No. 2) Order 2023 (S.S.I. 2023 No. 43)
- The South West Scotland Trunk Roads (Temporary Prohibitions of Traffic and Overtaking and Temporary Speed Restrictions) (No. 2) Order 2023 (S.S.I. 2023 No. 44)
- The First-tier Tribunal for Scotland (Transfer of Functions of Valuation Appeals Committees) Regulations 2023 (S.S.I. 2023 No. 45)
- The First-tier Tribunal for Scotland (Transfer of Functions of the Council Tax Reduction Review Panel) Regulations 2023 (S.S.I. 2023 No. 46)
- The First-tier Tribunal for Scotland Local Taxation Chamber and Upper Tribunal for Scotland (Composition) Regulations 2023 (S.S.I. 2023 No. 47)
- The Upper Tribunal for Scotland (Transfer of Valuation for Rating Appeal Functions of the Lands Tribunal for Scotland) Regulations 2023 (S.S.I. 2023 No. 48)
- The Criminal Justice (Scotland) Act 2016 (Commencement No. 7) Order 2023 (S.S.I. 2023 No. 49 (C. 4))
- The Scottish Landfill Tax (Standard Rate and Lower Rate) Order 2023 (S.S.I. 2023 No. 50)
- The Abusive Behaviour and Sexual Harm (Scotland) Act 2016 (Commencement No. 3, Transitional and Saving Provisions) Regulations 2023 (S.S.I. 2023 No. 51 (C. 5))
- The Water and Sewerage Services to Dwellings (Collection of Unmetered Charges by Local Authority) (Scotland) Order 2023 (S.S.I. 2023 No. 52)
- The Marriage and Marriage Registration (Prescription of Forms) (Scotland) Amendment Regulations 2023 (S.S.I. 2023 No. 53)
- The M8 (Newhouse to Easterhouse) M73 (Maryville to Mollinsburn) A8 (Newhouse to Bargeddie) A725 (Shawhead to Whistleberry) Trunk Roads (Temporary Prohibitions of Traffic and Overtaking and Temporary Speed Restrictions) Order 2023 (S.S.I. 2023 No. 54)
- The Marriage Between Civil Partners (Procedure for Change and Fees) (Scotland) Amendment Regulations 2023 (S.S.I. 2023 No. 55)
- The A84/A85 Trunk Road (Main Street, Callander) (Temporary Prohibition on Use, Waiting, Loading and Unloading) Order 2023 (S.S.I. 2023 No. 56)
- Act of Sederunt (Rules of the Court of Session 1994 Amendment) (Court Sittings) 2023 (S.S.I. 2023 No. 57)
- The Private Residential Tenancies and Assured Tenancies (Prescribed Notices and Forms) (Temporary Modifications) (Scotland) Regulations 2023 (S.S.I. 2023 No. 58)
- The Genetically Modified Food and Feed (Authorisations and Modifications of Authorisations) (Scotland) Regulations 2023 (S.S.I. 2023 No. 59)
- The A9 Trunk Road (Killiecrankie) (Temporary Prohibition on Use of Road) Order 2023 (S.S.I. 2023 No. 60)
- Act of Adjournal (Criminal Procedure Rules 1996 Amendment) (Sexual Harm Prevention Orders) 2023 (S.S.I. 2023 No. 61)
- Act of Sederunt (Summary Applications, Statutory Applications and Appeals etc. Rules 1999 Amendment) (Sexual Harm Prevention Orders and Sexual Risk Orders) 2023 (S.S.I. 2023 No. 62)
- The Non-Domestic Rates (Transitional Relief) (Scotland) Amendment Regulations 2023 (S.S.I. 2023 No. 63)
- The Non-Domestic Rates (Scotland) Act 2020 (Transitional Provision) Regulations 2023 (S.S.I. 2023 No. 64)
- The Building (Scotland) Amendment (No. 2) Regulations 2022 (Amendment) Regulations 2023 (S.S.I. 2023 No. 65)
- The Children’s Hearings (Scotland) Act 2011 (Safeguarders Panel) Amendment Regulations 2023 (S.S.I. 2023 No. 66)
- The Community Care (Personal Care and Nursing Care) (Scotland) Amendment Regulations 2023 (S.S.I. 2023 No. 67)
- The Local Government Finance (Scotland) Order 2023 (S.S.I. 2023 No. 68)
- The Environmental Regulation (Enforcement Measures) (Scotland) Amendment Order 2023 (S.S.I. 2023 No. 69)
- The A85 Trunk Road (Comrie) (Temporary Prohibition on Waiting, Loading and Unloading) Order 2023 (S.S.I. 2023 No. 70)
- The A77 Trunk Road (Main Street, Ballantrae) (Temporary Prohibition on Waiting) Order 2023 (S.S.I. 2023 No. 71)
- The Offensive Weapons Act 2019 (Commencement No. 3) (Scotland) Regulations 2023 (S.S.I. 2023 No. 72 (C. 6))
- The Civic Government (Scotland) Act 1982 (Licensing of Short-term Lets) (Amendment) Order 2023 (S.S.I. 2023 No. 73)
- The Education (Scotland) Act 2016 (Commencement No. 6) Regulations 2023 (S.S.I. 2023 No. 74 (C. 7))
- Act of Sederunt (Lands Valuation Appeal Court) 2023 (S.S.I. 2023 No. 75)
- Act of Sederunt (Valuation Appeal Rules Amendment) 2023 (S.S.I. 2023 No. 76)
- The Heat Networks (Scotland) Act 2021 (Commencement No. 2) Regulations 2023 (S.S.I. 2023 No. 77 (C. 8))
- The Food Additives, Food Flavourings and Novel Foods (Authorisations) (Scotland) Regulations 2023 (S.S.I. 2023 No. 78)
- The Disclosure (Scotland) Act 2020 (Commencement No. 2) Regulations 2023 (S.S.I. 2023 No. 79 (C. 9))
- The National Smart Ticketing Advisory Board (Scotland) Regulations 2023 (S.S.I. 2023 No. 80)
- The Scottish Local Government Elections Amendment Regulations 2023 (S.S.I. 2023 No. 81)
- The Cost of Living (Tenant Protection) (Scotland) Act 2022 (Amendment of Expiry Dates and Rent Cap Modification) Regulations 2023 (S.S.I. 2023 No. 82)
- The A76 Trunk Road (Sanquhar) (Temporary Prohibition on Waiting, Loading and Unloading) (No. 2) Order 2023 (S.S.I. 2023 No. 83)
- The A82 Trunk Road (Loch Ness Clansman Hotel) (Temporary Clearway) Order 2023 (S.S.I. 2023 No. 84)
- The A702 Trunk Road (Mauricewood Roundabout to the Glencorse Junction) (Temporary Clearway) Order 2023 (S.S.I. 2023 No. 85)
- The A835 Trunk Road (Ben Wyvis) (Temporary Clearway) Order 2023 (S.S.I. 2023 No. 86)
- The A87 Trunk Road (Eilean Donan) (Temporary Clearway) Order 2023 (S.S.I. 2023 No. 87)
- The A830 Trunk Road (Glenfinnan) (Temporary Clearway) Order 2023 (S.S.I. 2023 No. 88)
- The A84/A85 Trunk Road (Loch Lubnaig) (Temporary Clearway) Order 2023 (S.S.I. 2023 No. 89)
- The A830 Trunk Road (Morar) (Temporary Clearway) Order 2023 (S.S.I. 2023 No. 90)
- The A82 Trunk Road (Falls of Falloch) (Temporary Clearway) Order 2023 (S.S.I. 2023 No. 91)
- The Non-Domestic Rates (Miscellaneous Anti-Avoidance Measures) (Scotland) Regulations 2023 (S.S.I. 2023 No. 92)
- The Tuberculosis (Scotland) Order 2023 (S.S.I. 2023 No. 93)
- The South East Scotland Trunk Roads (Temporary Prohibitions of Traffic and Overtaking and Temporary Speed Restrictions) (No. 3) Order 2023 (S.S.I. 2023 No. 94)
- The North West Scotland Trunk Roads (Temporary Prohibitions of Traffic and Overtaking and Temporary Speed Restrictions) (No. 3) Order 2023 (S.S.I. 2023 No. 95)
- The North East Scotland Trunk Roads (Temporary Prohibitions of Traffic and Overtaking and Temporary Speed Restrictions) (No. 3) Order 2023 (S.S.I. 2023 No. 96)
- The Town and Country Planning (Play Sufficiency Assessment) (Scotland) Regulations 2023 (S.S.I. 2023 No. 97)
- The Fireworks and Pyrotechnic Articles (Scotland) Act 2022 (Designation of Events and Incidental Provision) Regulations 2023 (S.S.I. 2023 No. 98)
- The Fireworks and Pyrotechnic Articles (Scotland) Act 2022 (Commencement No. 2) Regulations 2023 (S.S.I. 2023 No. 99 (C. 10))
- The Planning (Scotland) Act 2019 (Commencement No. 12 and Saving and Transitional Provisions) Regulations 2023 (S.S.I. 2023 No. 100 (C. 11))

== 101–200 ==
- The Town and Country Planning (Development Planning) (Scotland) Regulations 2023 (S.S.I. 2023 No. 101)
- The A83 Trunk Road (Arrochar) (Temporary Prohibition on Waiting, Loading and Unloading) Order 2023 (S.S.I. 2023 No. 102)
- The Renewables Obligation (Scotland) Amendment Order 2023 (S.S.I. 2023 No. 103)
- The Land Reform (Scotland) Act 2016 (Register of Persons Holding a Controlled Interest in Land) Amendment Regulations 2023 (S.S.I. 2023 No. 104)
- The M8 (Newhouse to Easterhouse) M73 (Maryville to Mollinsburn) M74 (Daldowie to Hamilton) A8 (Newhouse to Bargeddie) A725 (Shawhead to Whistleberry) A7071 (Bellshill) Trunk Roads (Temporary Prohibitions of Traffic and Overtaking and Temporary Speed Restrictions) Order 2023 (S.S.I. 2023 No. 105)
- The A83 Trunk Road (Arrochar) (Temporary Prohibition on Waiting, Loading and Unloading) (No. 2) Order 2023 (S.S.I. 2023 No. 106)
- The Alcoholic Beverages, Fruit and Vegetables (Miscellaneous Amendment) (Scotland) Regulations 2023 (S.S.I. 2023 No. 107)
- The National Bus Travel Concession Schemes (Miscellaneous Amendments) (Scotland) Order 2023 (S.S.I. 2023 No. 108)
- The Valuation Timetable (Scotland) Amendment Order 2023 (S.S.I. 2023 No. 109)
- The Social Security Up-rating (Scotland) Order 2023 (S.S.I. 2023 No. 110)
- The Social Security (Up-rating) (Miscellaneous Amendments) (Scotland) Regulations 2023 (S.S.I. 2023 No. 111)
- The Provision of Early Learning and Childcare (Specified Children) (Scotland) Amendment Order 2023 (S.S.I. 2023 No. 112)
- The Council Tax Reduction (Scotland) Amendment Regulations 2023 (S.S.I. 2023 No. 113)
- The Bee Diseases and Pests Control (Scotland) (Amendment) Order 2023 (S.S.I. 2023 No. 114)
- The Budget (Scotland) Act 2022 Amendment (No. 2) Regulations 2023 (S.S.I. 2023 No. 115)
- The Cost of Living (Tenant Protection) (Scotland) Act 2022 (Incidental Provision) Regulations 2023 (S.S.I. 2023 No. 116)
- The A737 Trunk Road (Beith) (Temporary 30 mph Speed Restriction) Order 2023 (S.S.I. 2023 No. 117)
- The A96 Trunk Road (Tyrebagger Junction Area) (Temporary Prohibition of Specified Turns) Order 2023 (S.S.I. 2023 No. 118)
- The Crime (International Co-operation) Act 2003 (Designation of Participating Countries) (Scotland) Order 2023 (S.S.I. 2023 No. 119)
- The A90 Trunk Road (Stirling to Invernettie Roundabout) (Temporary 40 mph Speed Restriction) Order 2023 (S.S.I. 2023 No. 120)
- The M8 Trunk Road (Arkleston to West Street) (Temporary Prohibition on Use of Road and Temporary 40 mph Speed Restriction) Order 2023 (S.S.I. 2023 No. 121)
- The A76 Trunk Road (Carronbridge) (Temporary Prohibition on Waiting, Loading and Unloading) Order 2023 (S.S.I. 2023 No. 122)
- The Heat Networks (Heat Network Zones and Building Assessment Reports) (Scotland) Regulations 2023 (S.S.I. 2023 No. 123)
- The Public Procurement (Miscellaneous Amendments) (Scotland) Regulations 2023 (S.S.I. 2023 No. 124)
- The National Health Service (Optical Charges and Payments) (Scotland) Amendment Regulations 2023 (S.S.I. 2023 No. 125)
- The North East Scotland Trunk Roads (Temporary Prohibitions of Traffic and Overtaking and Temporary Speed Restrictions) (No. 4) Order 2023 (S.S.I. 2023 No. 126)
- The Health and Care (Staffing) (Scotland) Act 2019 Amendment Regulations 2023 (S.S.I. 2023 No. 127)
- The North West Scotland Trunk Roads (Temporary Prohibitions of Traffic and Overtaking and Temporary Speed Restrictions) (No. 4) Order 2023 (S.S.I. 2023 No. 128)
- The South East Scotland Trunk Roads (Temporary Prohibitions of Traffic and Overtaking and Temporary Speed Restrictions) (No. 4) Order 2023 (S.S.I. 2023 No. 129)
- The South West Scotland Trunk Roads (Temporary Prohibitions of Traffic and Overtaking and Temporary Speed Restrictions) (No. 3) Order 2023 (S.S.I. 2023 No. 130)
- The Health and Care (Staffing) (Scotland) Act 2019 (Commencement No. 1) Regulations 2023 (S.S.I. 2023 No. 131 (C. 12))
- The Discontinuance of Cornton Vale Prison (Scotland) Order 2023 (S.S.I. 2023 No. 132)
- The A702 Trunk Road (Hillend) (Temporary Prohibition on Waiting, Loading and Unloading) Order 2023 (S.S.I. 2023 No. 133)
- The A76 Trunk Road (Carronbridge) (Temporary Prohibition on Waiting, Loading and Unloading) (No. 2) Order 2023 (S.S.I. 2023 No. 134)
- The Legal Aid and Advice and Assistance (Miscellaneous Amendment) (Scotland) (No. 2) Regulations 2023 (S.S.I. 2023 No. 135)
- The M8 (Newhouse to Easterhouse) M73 (Maryville to Mollinsburn) M74 (Daldowie to Hamilton) A725 (Shawhead to Whistleberry) Trunk Roads (Temporary Prohibitions of Traffic and Overtaking and Temporary Speed Restrictions) (No. 2) Order 2023 (S.S.I. 2023 No. 136)
- The A85 Trunk Road (Comrie) (Temporary Prohibition on Use of Road) Order 2023 (S.S.I. 2023 No. 137)
- The A82 Trunk Road (Corran Ferry) (Temporary Clearway and Temporary 30 mph Speed Restriction) Order 2023 (S.S.I. 2023 No. 138)
- The Criminal Justice (Scotland) Act 2016 (Commencement No. 8) Order 2023 (S.S.I. 2023 No. 139 (C. 13))
- The A78 Trunk Road (Skelmorlie to Largs) (Temporary 40 mph Speed Restriction) Order 2022 (S.S.I. 2023 No. 140)
- The Council Tax (Discounts) (Scotland) Amendment (No. 2) Order 2023 (S.S.I. 2023 No. 141)
- The Education (Fees and Student Support) (Miscellaneous Amendment) (Scotland) Regulations 2023 (S.S.I. 2023 No. 142)
- The Animal Health (Miscellaneous Fees) (Amendment and Revocation) (Scotland) Order 2023 (S.S.I. 2023 No. 143)
- The A85 Trunk Road (Comrie) (Temporary Prohibition on Waiting, Loading and Unloading) (No. 2) Order 2023 (S.S.I. 2023 No. 144)
- The Burial and Cremation (Scotland) Act 2016 (Commencement No. 5) Regulations 2023 (S.S.I. 2023 No. 145 (C. 14))
- The Civil Partnership (Scotland) Act 2020 (Commencement No. 5) Regulations 2023 (S.S.I. 2023 No. 146 (C. 15))
- The A90 Trunk Road (Kingsway West, Dundee) (Temporary Prohibition on Use of Road) Order 2023 (S.S.I. 2023 No. 147)
- The Heat Networks (Scotland) Act 2021 (Commencement No. 3) Regulations 2023 (S.S.I. 2023 No. 148 (C. 16))
- The Social Security (Residence Requirements) (Sudan) (Scotland) Regulations 2023 (S.S.I. 2023 No. 149)
- The Public Intervention and Private Storage Aid (Amendment and Suspension) (Scotland) Regulations 2023 (S.S.I. 2023 No. 150)
- The Seed (Fees) (Scotland) Amendment Regulations 2023 (S.S.I. 2023 No. 151)
- The North East Scotland Trunk Roads (Temporary Prohibitions of Traffic and Overtaking and Temporary Speed Restrictions) (No. 5) Order 2023 (S.S.I. 2023 No. 152)
- The North West Scotland Trunk Roads (Temporary Prohibitions of Traffic and Overtaking and Temporary Speed Restrictions) (No. 5) Order 2023 (S.S.I. 2023 No. 153)
- The South East Scotland Trunk Roads (Temporary Prohibitions of Traffic and Overtaking and Temporary Speed Restrictions) (No. 5) Order 2023 (S.S.I. 2023 No. 154)
- The South West Scotland Trunk Roads (Temporary Prohibitions of Traffic and Overtaking and Temporary Speed Restrictions) (No. 4) Order 2023 (S.S.I. 2023 No. 155)
- The National Smart Ticketing Advisory Board (Gender Representation on Public Boards) (Scotland) Regulations 2023 (S.S.I. 2023 No. 156)
- The Fireworks and Pyrotechnic Articles (Scotland) Act 2022 (Consequential Modifications, Saving and Transitional Provisions) Regulations 2023 (S.S.I. 2023 No. 157)
- The First-tier Tribunal for Scotland (Allocation of Functions to the General Regulatory Chamber) Regulations 2023 (S.S.I. 2023 No. 158)
- The First-tier Tribunal for Scotland General Regulatory Chamber and Upper Tribunal for Scotland (Composition and Rules of Procedure) (Miscellaneous Amendment) Regulations 2023 (S.S.I. 2023 No. 159)
- The Packaging Waste (Data Reporting) (Scotland) Amendment Regulations 2023 (S.S.I. 2023 No. 160)
- The Food (Scotland) Act 2015 (Compliance Notices) Regulations 2023 (S.S.I. 2023 No. 161)
- The A85 Trunk Road (Oban) (Temporary Prohibition on Use of Road) Order 2023 (S.S.I. 2023 No. 162)
- The M8 (Newhouse to Easterhouse) M73 (Maryville to Mollinsburn) A8 (Newhouse to Bargeddie) A725 (Shawhead to Whistleberry) Trunk Roads (Temporary Prohibitions of Traffic and Overtaking and Temporary Speed Restrictions) (No. 2) Order 2023 (S.S.I. 2023 No. 163)
- The Climate Change (Scotland) Act 2009 (Interim Target) Amendment Regulations 2023 (S.S.I. 2023 No. 164)
- Act of Sederunt (Fees of Solicitors in the Court of Session, Sheriff Appeal Court and Sheriff Court) (Taxation of Judicial Expenses Rules) (Amendment) 2023 (S.S.I. 2023 No. 165)
- The Valuation Timetable (Scotland) Amendment (No. 2) Order 2023 (S.S.I. 2023 No. 166)
- The Millport Harbour Revision Order 2023 (S.S.I. 2023 No. 167)
- Act of Sederunt (Rules of the Court of Session 1994 and Ordinary Cause Rules 1993 Amendment) (Attendance at Hearings) 2023 (S.S.I. 2023 No. 168)
- Act of Adjournal (Criminal Procedure Rules 1996 Amendment) (European Union (Future Relationship) Act 2020) 2023 (S.S.I. 2023 No. 169)
- The Feed Additives (Form of Provisional Authorisations) (Cobalt(II) Compounds) (Scotland) Regulations 2023 (S.S.I. 2023 No. 170)
- The Lews Castle College (Transfer and Closure) (Scotland) Order 2023 (S.S.I. 2023 No. 171)
- The Coronavirus (Recovery and Reform) (Scotland) Act 2022 (Early Expiry of Provisions) Regulations 2023 (S.S.I. 2023 No. 172)
- The National Health Service (Charges to Overseas Visitors) (Scotland) Amendment Regulations 2023 (S.S.I. 2023 No. 173)
- The A87 Trunk Road (Portree to Prabost) (Temporary Prohibition on Use of Road) Order 2023 (S.S.I. 2023 No. 174)
- The A96 Trunk Road (Tyrebagger Junction Area) (Temporary Prohibition of Specified Turns) (No. 2) Order 2023 (S.S.I. 2023 No. 175)
- The Fireworks and Pyrotechnic Articles (Scotland) Act 2022 (Commencement No. 3) Regulations 2023 (S.S.I. 2023 No. 176 (C. 17))
- The Building (Scotland) Amendment Regulations 2023 (S.S.I. 2023 No. 177)
- The Legal Aid and Advice and Assistance (Miscellaneous Amendment) (Scotland) (No. 3) Regulations 2023 (S.S.I. 2023 No. 178)
- The A83 Trunk Road (Inveraray) (Temporary Prohibition on Use of Road) Order 2023 (S.S.I. 2023 No. 179)
- The A76 Trunk Road (Sanquhar) (Temporary Prohibition on Waiting, Loading and Unloading) (No. 3) Order 2023 (S.S.I. 2023 No. 180)
- The National Health Service (Free Prescriptions and Charges for Drugs and Appliances) (Scotland) Amendment Regulations 2023 (S.S.I. 2023 No. 181)
- The Management of Offenders (Scotland) Act 2019 (Commencement No. 7) Regulations 2023 (S.S.I. 2023 No. 182 (C. 18))
- The Good Food Nation (Scotland) Act 2022 (Commencement No. 1) Regulations 2023 (S.S.I. 2023 No. 183 (C. 19))
- The Deer (Close Seasons) (Scotland) Amendment Order 2023 (S.S.I. 2023 No. 184)
- The A76 Trunk Road (Sanquhar) (Temporary Prohibition on Waiting, Loading and Unloading) (No. 4) Order 2023 (S.S.I. 2023 No. 185)
- The A83 Trunk Road (Tarbert) (Temporary Prohibition on Use of Road) Order 2023 (S.S.I. 2023 No. 186)
- The A85 Trunk Road (Comrie) (Temporary Prohibition on Use of Road) (No. 2) Order 2023 (S.S.I. 2023 No. 187)
- The South East Scotland Trunk Roads (Temporary Prohibitions of Traffic and Overtaking and Temporary Speed Restrictions) (No. 6) Order 2023 (S.S.I. 2023 No. 188)
- The North East Scotland Trunk Roads (Temporary Prohibitions of Traffic and Overtaking and Temporary Speed Restrictions) (No. 6) Order 2023 (S.S.I. 2023 No. 189)
- The Teachers’ Superannuation and Pension Scheme (Miscellaneous Amendments) (Scotland) Regulations 2023 (S.S.I. 2023 No. 190)
- The A96 Trunk Road (Tyrebagger Junction Area) (Prohibition of Specified Turns) Order 2023 (S.S.I. 2023 No. 191)
- The North West Scotland Trunk Roads (Temporary Prohibitions of Traffic and Overtaking and Temporary Speed Restrictions) (No. 6) Order 2023 (S.S.I. 2023 No. 192)
- The Cereal Seed (Scotland) Amendment Regulations 2023 (S.S.I. 2023 No. 193)
- The Forced Marriage etc. (Protection and Jurisdiction) (Scotland) Act 2011 (Application to Civil Partnerships and Consequential Provision) Order 2023 (S.S.I. 2023 No. 194)
- The M8 (Newhouse to Easterhouse) M73 (Maryville to Mollinsburn) M74 (Daldowie to Hamilton) A8 (Newhouse to Bargeddie) A725 (Shawhead to Whistleberry) A7071 (Bellshill) Trunk Roads (Temporary Prohibitions of Traffic and Overtaking and Temporary Speed Restrictions) (No. 2) Order 2023 (S.S.I. 2023 No. 195)
- Act of Sederunt (Rules of the Court of Session 1994, Sheriff Appeal Court Rules and Sheriff Court Rules Amendment) (Miscellaneous) 2023 (S.S.I. 2023 No. 196)
- The Council Tax Reduction (Scotland) Amendment (No. 2) Regulations 2023 (S.S.I. 2023 No. 197)
- The Animal By-Products and Animal Health (Miscellaneous Fees) (Scotland) Regulations 2023 (S.S.I. 2023 No. 198)
- The Police Negotiating Board for Scotland (Constitution, Arbitration and Qualifying Cases) Regulations 2023 (S.S.I. 2023 No. 199)
- The First-tier Tribunal for Scotland Local Taxation Chamber and Upper Tribunal for Scotland (Composition and Procedure) (Miscellaneous Amendment) Regulations 2023 (S.S.I. 2023 No. 200)

== 201–300 ==
- The Deposit and Return Scheme for Scotland Amendment Regulations 2023 (S.S.I. 2023 No. 201)
- The A76 Trunk Road (Mauchline) (Temporary Prohibition on Use of Road) Order 2023 (S.S.I. 2023 No. 202)
- The A83 Trunk Road (Inveraray) (Temporary Prohibition on Use of Road) (No. 2) Order 2023 (S.S.I. 2023 No. 203)
- The A835/A893 Trunk Road (Ullapool) (Temporary 20 mph Speed Restriction) Order 2023 (S.S.I. 2023 No. 204)
- The A85 Trunk Road (Lochearnhead) (Temporary Prohibition on Use of Road) Order 2023 (S.S.I. 2023 No. 205)
- The A85 Trunk Road (Comrie) (Temporary Prohibition on Use of Road) (No. 3) Order 2023 (S.S.I. 2023 No. 206)
- The Valuation (Proposals Procedure) (Scotland) Amendment Regulations 2023 (S.S.I. 2023 No. 207)
- The International Organisations (Immunities and Privileges) (Scotland) Amendment Order 2023 (S.S.I. 2023 No. 208)
- The A8 Trunk Road (East Hamilton Street, Greenock) (Temporary Prohibition on Use of Road) Order 2023 (S.S.I. 2023 No. 209)
- The A77 Trunk Road (Girvan) (Temporary Prohibition on Waiting, Loading and Unloading) Order 2023 (S.S.I. 2023 No. 210)
- The North West Scotland Trunk Roads (Temporary Prohibitions of Traffic and Overtaking and Temporary Speed Restrictions) (No. 7) Order 2023 (S.S.I. 2023 No. 211)
- The North East Scotland Trunk Roads (Temporary Prohibitions of Traffic and Overtaking and Temporary Speed Restrictions) (No. 7) Order 2023 (S.S.I. 2023 No. 212)
- The South East Scotland Trunk Roads (Temporary Prohibitions of Traffic and Overtaking and Temporary Speed Restrictions) (No. 7) Order 2023 (S.S.I. 2023 No. 213)
- The South West Scotland Trunk Roads (Temporary Prohibitions of Traffic and Overtaking and Temporary Speed Restrictions) (No. 5) Order 2023 (S.S.I. 2023 No. 214)
- The A82 Trunk Road (Fort William to Spean Bridge) (Temporary 30 mph Speed Restriction) Order 2023 (S.S.I. 2023 No. 215)
- The A86 Trunk Road (Spean Bridge to Kingussie) (Temporary 30 mph Speed Restriction) Order 2023 (S.S.I. 2023 No. 216)
- The A85 (Perth to Methven) M9/A9 (Pitlochry) Trunk Roads (Temporary Prohibition on Use of Road) Order 2023 (S.S.I. 2023 No. 217)
- The M8 (Newhouse to Easterhouse) M73 (Maryville to Mollinsburn) M74 (Daldowie to Hamilton) A725 (Shawhead to Whistleberry) Trunk Roads (Temporary Prohibitions of Traffic and Overtaking and Temporary Speed Restrictions) (No. 3) Order 2023 (S.S.I. 2023 No. 218)
- The M8 Trunk Road (Junction 18, Westbound) (Temporary Prohibition on Use of Road) Order 2023 (S.S.I. 2023 No. 219)
- The A84 Trunk Road (Blair Drummond) (Temporary Prohibition on Use of Road and Temporary 30 mph Speed Restriction) Order 2023 (S.S.I. 2023 No. 220)
- The M90/A90/A9000 Trunk Road (Kirkliston to Ferrytoll) (Temporary Prohibition on Use of Road) Order 2023 (S.S.I. 2023 No. 221)
- The M876/A876 (Clackmannanshire Bridge) A977 (Longannet Roundabout to Gartarry Roundabout) and A985 (Rosyth to Kincardine Bridge) Trunk Roads (Temporary Prohibition on Use of Road) Order 2023 (S.S.I. 2023 No. 222)
- Act of Sederunt (Summary Applications, Statutory Applications and Appeals etc. Rules 1999 and Taxation of Judicial Expenses Rules 2019 Amendment) (Telecommunications Infrastructure) 2023 (S.S.I. 2023 No. 223)
- The M8 Trunk Road (Arkleston to West Street) (Temporary Prohibition on Use of Road and Temporary 40 mph Speed Restriction) (No. 2) Order 2023 (S.S.I. 2023 No. 224)
- The A83 Trunk Road (Ardrishaig) (Temporary Prohibition on Use of Road) Order 2023 (S.S.I. 2023 No. 225)
- The A83 Trunk Road (Campbeltown) (Temporary Prohibition on Use of Road) Order 2023 (S.S.I. 2023 No. 226)
- The A85 Trunk Road (Crieff) (Temporary Prohibition on Use of Road) Order 2023 (S.S.I. 2023 No. 227)
- The M9/A9 Trunk Road (Granish) (Temporary Prohibition on Use of Road and Specified Turns) Order 2023 (S.S.I. 2023 No. 228)
- The A95 Trunk Road (Granish to Grantown-On-Spey) (Temporary Prohibition on Use of Road and Specified Turns) Order 2023 (S.S.I. 2023 No. 229)
- The North East Scotland Trunk Roads (Temporary Prohibitions of Traffic and Overtaking and Temporary Speed Restrictions) (No. 8) Order 2023 (S.S.I. 2023 No. 230)
- The North West Scotland Trunk Roads (Temporary Prohibitions of Traffic and Overtaking and Temporary Speed Restrictions) (No. 8) Order 2023 (S.S.I. 2023 No. 231)
- The South East Scotland Trunk Roads (Temporary Prohibitions of Traffic and Overtaking and Temporary Speed Restrictions) (No. 8) Order 2023 (S.S.I. 2023 No. 232)
- The South West Scotland Trunk Roads (Temporary Prohibitions of Traffic and Overtaking and Temporary Speed Restrictions) (No. 6) Order 2023 (S.S.I. 2023 No. 233)
- The A77 Trunk Road (Ballantrae) (Temporary Prohibition on Waiting, Loading and Unloading) Order 2023 (S.S.I. 2023 No. 234)
- The A85 Trunk Road (Oban) (Temporary Prohibition on Use of Road) (No. 2) Order 2023 (S.S.I. 2023 No. 235)
- The A76 Trunk Road (Auchinleck) (Temporary 30 mph Speed Restriction) Order 2023 (S.S.I. 2023 No. 236)
- The M8 (Newhouse to Easterhouse) M73 (Maryville to Mollinsburn) A8 (Newhouse to Bargeddie) A725 (Shawhead to Whistleberry) Trunk Roads (Temporary Prohibitions of Traffic and Overtaking and Temporary Speed Restrictions) (No. 3) Order 2023 (S.S.I. 2023 No. 237)
- The M8 Trunk Road (Arkleston to West Street) (Temporary Prohibition on Use of Road and Temporary 40 mph Speed Restriction) (No. 3) Order 2023 (S.S.I. 2023 No. 238)
- The Police Pensions (Remediable Service) (Scotland) Regulations 2023 (S.S.I. 2023 No. 239)
- The Local Government Pension Scheme (Remediable Service) (Scotland) Regulations 2023 (S.S.I. 2023 No. 240)
- The Teachers’ Pensions (Remediable Service) (Scotland) Regulations 2023 (S.S.I. 2023 No. 241)
- The Firefighters’ Pensions (Remediable Service) (Scotland) Regulations 2023 (S.S.I. 2023 No. 242)
- The Personal Injuries (NHS Charges) (Amounts) (Scotland) Amendment (No. 2) Regulations 2023 (S.S.I. 2023 No. 243)
- The A77 Trunk Road (Glendoune Street, Girvan) (Temporary Prohibition of Waiting, Loading and Unloading) Order 2023 (S.S.I. 2023 No. 244)
- The A85 Trunk Road (Comrie) (Temporary Prohibition of Waiting, Loading and Unloading) (No. 3) Order 2023 (S.S.I. 2023 No. 245)
- The National Health Service Pension Schemes (Remediable Service) (Scotland) Regulations 2023 (S.S.I. 2023 No. 246)
- The National Health Service (General Dental Services) (Miscellaneous Amendment) (Scotland) Regulations 2023 (S.S.I. 2023 No. 247)
- The Parking Attendants (Wearing of Uniforms) (North Ayrshire Council) Regulations 2023 (S.S.I. 2023 No. 248)
- The Road Traffic (Permitted Parking Area and Special Parking Area) (North Ayrshire Council) Designation Order 2023 (S.S.I. 2023 No. 249)
- The Transport (Scotland) Act 2019 (Commencement No. 7) Regulations 2023 (S.S.I. 2023 No. 250 (C. 20))
- The A77 Trunk Road (Vicarton Street, Girvan) (Temporary Prohibition of Waiting, Loading and Unloading) Order 2023 (S.S.I. 2023 No. 251)
- The A85 Trunk Road (Crieff and Comrie) (Temporary 20 mph Speed Restriction) Order 2023 (S.S.I. 2023 No. 252)
- The A84 Trunk Road (Callander) (Temporary 20 mph Speed Restriction) Order 2023 (S.S.I. 2023 No. 253)
- The A82 Trunk Road (Glencoe) (Temporary Prohibition on Use of Road and Temporary 30 mph Speed Restriction) Order 2023 (S.S.I. 2023 No. 254)
- The Local Government Investments (Scotland) Amendment Regulations 2023 (S.S.I. 2023 No. 255)
- Not Allocated (S.S.I. 2023 No. 256)
- The Sports Grounds and Sporting Events (Designation) (Scotland) Amendment Order 2023 (S.S.I. 2023 No. 257)
- The Carer’s Assistance (Carer Support Payment) (Consequential and Miscellaneous Amendments and Transitional Provision) (Scotland) Regulations 2023 (S.S.I. 2023 No. 258)
- The A87 Trunk Road (Kyle of Lochalsh and Uig Ferry Terminal) (Temporary 20 mph Speed Restriction) Order 2023 (S.S.I. 2023 No. 259)
- The A82 Trunk Road (Drumnadrochit) (Temporary 20 mph Speed Restriction) Order 2023 (S.S.I. 2023 No. 260)
- The M9/A9 Trunk Roads (Brora, Scrabster and Thurso) (Temporary 20 mph Speed Restriction) Order 2023 (S.S.I. 2023 No. 261)
- The Hunting with Dogs (Scotland) Act 2023 (Commencement) Regulations 2023 (S.S.I. 2023 No. 262 (C. 21))
- The A835/A893 Trunk Road (Contin) (Temporary 20 mph Speed Restriction) Order 2023 (S.S.I. 2023 No. 263)
- The A86 Trunk Road (Kingussie) (Temporary 20 mph Speed Restriction) Order 2023 (S.S.I. 2023 No. 264)
- The A830 Trunk Road (Mallaig) (Temporary 20 mph Speed Restriction) Order 2023 (S.S.I. 2023 No. 265)
- The Marriage Between Persons of Different Sexes (Prescribed Bodies) (Scotland) Amendment Regulations 2023 (S.S.I. 2023 No. 266)
- The Nutritional Requirements for Food and Drink in Schools (Scotland) Amendment Regulations 2023 (S.S.I. 2023 No. 267)
- The Council Tax Reduction (Scotland) Amendment (No. 3) Regulations 2023 (S.S.I. 2023 No. 268)
- The A830 Trunk Road (Glenfinnan) (Temporary Prohibition of Waiting) Order 2023 (S.S.I. 2023 No. 269)
- The A84 Trunk Road (Main Street/Leny Road, Callander) (Temporary Prohibition on Waiting, Loading and Unloading) Order 2023 (S.S.I. 2023 No. 270)
- The North East Scotland Trunk Roads (Temporary Prohibitions of Traffic and Overtaking and Temporary Speed Restrictions) (No. 9) Order 2023 (S.S.I. 2023 No. 271)
- The North West Scotland Trunk Roads (Temporary Prohibitions of Traffic and Overtaking and Temporary Speed Restrictions) (No. 9) Order 2023 (S.S.I. 2023 No. 272)
- The South East Scotland Trunk Roads (Temporary Prohibitions of Traffic and Overtaking and Temporary Speed Restrictions) (No. 9) Order 2023 (S.S.I. 2023 No. 273)
- The A78 Trunk Road (Irvine Road) (Temporary 40 mph Speed Restriction) Order 2023 (S.S.I. 2023 No. 274)
- The Cost of Living (Tenant Protection) (Scotland) Act 2022 (Amendment of Expiry Date) Regulations 2023 (S.S.I. 2023 No. 275)
- Act of Adjournal (Criminal Procedure Rules 1996 Amendment) (Witness Citations in Solemn Proceedings) 2023 (S.S.I. 2023 No. 276)
- The M8 (Newhouse to Easterhouse) M73 (Maryville to Mollinsburn) M74 (Daldowie to Hamilton) A8 (Newhouse to Bargeddie) A725 (Shawhead to Whistleberry) A7071 (Bellshill) Trunk Roads (Temporary Prohibitions of Traffic and Overtaking and Temporary Speed Restrictions) (No. 3) Order 2023 (S.S.I. 2023 No. 277)
- The Title Conditions (Scotland) Act 2003 (Conservation Bodies and Rural Housing Bodies) (Miscellaneous Amendment) Order 2023 (S.S.I. 2023 No. 278)
- The A85 Trunk Road (Drummond Street, Comrie) (Temporary Prohibition on Waiting, Loading and Unloading) Order 2023 (S.S.I. 2023 No. 279)
- The Land and Buildings Transaction Tax (Green Freeports Relief) (Scotland) Order 2023 (S.S.I. 2023 No. 280)
- The National Health Service (General Medical Services Contracts and Primary Medical Services Section 17C Agreements) (Miscellaneous Amendments) (Scotland) Regulations 2023 (S.S.I. 2023 No. 281)
- The Social Security (Iceland) (Liechtenstein) (Norway) (Further provision in respect of Scotland) Order 2023 (S.S.I. 2023 No. 282)
- The M77/A77 Trunk Road (Girvan to Lendalfoot) (Temporary 40mph Speed Restriction) Order 2023 (S.S.I. 2023 No. 283)
- The M74/A74 Trunk Road (Junction 9) (Temporary 50mph Speed Restriction) Order 2023 (S.S.I. 2023 No. 284)
- The M8/A8/A8(M) Trunk Road (Woodhall Roundabout to Langbank Roundabout) (Temporary 50mph Speed Restriction) Order 2023 (S.S.I. 2023 No. 285)
- The A84 Trunk Road (Main Street/Leny Road, Callander) (Temporary Prohibition on Waiting, Loading and Unloading) (No. 2) Order 2023 (S.S.I. 2023 No. 286)
- The Public Procurement (Agreement on Government Procurement) (Miscellaneous Amendments) (Scotland) Regulations 2023 (S.S.I. 2023 No. 287)
- The Non-Domestic Rating Contributions (Scotland) Amendment Regulations 2023 (S.S.I. 2023 No. 288)
- The North West Scotland Trunk Roads (Temporary Prohibitions of Traffic and Overtaking and Temporary Speed Restrictions) (No. 10) Order 2023 (S.S.I. 2023 No. 289)
- The North East Scotland Trunk Roads (Temporary Prohibitions of Traffic and Overtaking and Temporary Speed Restrictions) (No. 10) Order 2023 (S.S.I. 2023 No. 290)
- The South East Scotland Trunk Roads (Temporary Prohibitions of Traffic and Overtaking and Temporary Speed Restrictions) (No. 10) Order 2023 (S.S.I. 2023 No. 291)
- The A82 Trunk Roads (Inverness and Fort Augustus) (Temporary 20mph Speed Restriction) Order 2023 (S.S.I. 2023 No. 292)
- The South West Scotland Trunk Roads (Temporary Prohibitions of Traffic and Overtaking and Temporary Speed Restrictions) (No. 7) Order 2023 (S.S.I. 2023 No. 293)
- The A99 Trunk Road (Wick) (Temporary 20mph Speed Restriction) Order 2023 (S.S.I. 2023 No. 294)
- The A86 Trunk Roads (Spean Bridge and Newtonmore) (Temporary 20mph Speed Restriction) Order 2023 (S.S.I. 2023 No. 295)
- The A96 Trunk Road (Nairn) (Temporary 20mph Speed Restriction) Order 2023 (S.S.I. 2023 No. 296)
- The M9/A9 Trunk Roads (Helmsdale and Golspie) (Temporary 20mph Speed Restriction) Order 2023 (S.S.I. 2023 No. 297)
- The M9/A9 Trunk Road (Golspie) (Temporary 40mph Speed Restriction) Order 2023 (S.S.I. 2023 No. 298)
- The A87 Trunk Roads (Broadford and Portree) (Temporary 20mph Speed Restriction) Order 2023 (S.S.I. 2023 No. 299)
- The Public Procurement (Agreement on Government Procurement) (Thresholds) (Miscellaneous Amendments) (Scotland) Regulations 2023 (S.S.I. 2023 No. 300)

== 301-400 ==
- The A830 Trunk Roads (Banvie and Corpach) (Temporary 20mph and 30mph Speed Restrictions) Order 2023 (S.S.I. 2023 No. 301)
- The Carer’s Assistance (Carer Support Payment) (Scotland) Regulations 2023 (S.S.I. 2023 No. 302)
- The A83 Trunk Road (Lochgilphead) (Temporary Prohibition on Use of Road) Order 2023 (S.S.I. 2023 No. 303)
- The A7 Trunk Road (Langholm) (Temporary Prohibition on Use of Road) Order 2023 (S.S.I. 2023 No. 304)
- The A85 Trunk Road (Comrie) (Temporary Prohibition on Use of Road) (No. 4) Order 2023 (S.S.I. 2023 No. 305)
- The A702 Trunk Road (Hillend) (Temporary Prohibition on Waiting, Loading and Unloading) (No. 2) Order 2023 (S.S.I. 2023 No. 306)*
- The M8 (Newhouse to Easterhouse) M73 (Maryville to Mollinsburn) M74 (Daldowie to Hamilton) A725 (Shawhead to Whistleberry) Trunk Roads (Temporary Prohibitions of Traffic and Overtaking and Temporary Speed Restrictions) (No. 4) Order 2023 (S.S.I. 2023 No. 307)
- The Rural Support (Simplification and Improvement) (Scotland) Regulations 2023 (S.S.I. 2023 No. 308)
- The Social Security (Residence and Presence Requirements) (Israel, the West Bank, the Gaza Strip, East Jerusalem, the Golan Heights and Lebanon) (Scotland) Regulations 2023 (S.S.I. 2023 No. 309)
- The UK Withdrawal from the European Union (Continuity) (Scotland) Act 2021 (Commencement No. 3) Regulations 2023 (S.S.I. 2023 No. 310 (C. 22))
- The Common Organisation of the Markets in Agricultural Products (Fruit and Vegetables) (Amendment) (Scotland) Regulations 2023 (S.S.I. 2023 No. 311)
- The Animal Welfare and Food Safety (International Professional Qualification Recognition Agreement Implementation) (Miscellaneous Amendment) (Scotland) Regulations 2023 (S.S.I. 2023 No. 312)
- The Legal Aid and Advice and Assistance (Miscellaneous Amendment) (Scotland) (No. 4) Regulations 2023 (S.S.I. 2023 No. 313)
- The A96 Trunk Road (Keith) (Temporary Prohibition on Use of Road) Order 2023 (S.S.I. 2023 No. 314)
- The A83 Trunk Road (Cairndow) (Temporary Prohibition on Use of Road) Order 2023 (S.S.I. 2023 No. 315)
- The A83 Trunk Road (Lochgilphead) (Temporary Prohibition on Use of Road) (No. 2) Order 2023 (S.S.I. 2023 No. 316)
- The A83 Trunk Road (Ardrishaig) (Temporary Prohibition on Use of Road) (No. 2) Order 2023 (S.S.I. 2023 No. 317)
- The A9 Trunk Road (Brora) (Temporary Prohibition on Use of Road) Order 2023 (S.S.I. 2023 No. 318)
- The A82 Trunk Road (Spean Bridge) (Temporary Prohibition on Use of Road) Order 2023 (S.S.I. 2023 No. 319)
- The A77 Trunk Road (Ballantrae) (Temporary Prohibition on Waiting, Loading and Unloading) (No. 2) Order 2023 (S.S.I. 2023 No. 320)
- The A83 Trunk Road (Arrochar) (Temporary Prohibition on Use of Road) Order 2023 (S.S.I. 2023 No. 321)
- The A83 Trunk Road (Tarbert) (Temporary Prohibition on Use of Road) (No. 2) Order 2023 (S.S.I. 2023 No. 322)
- The A84 Trunk Road (Doune) (Temporary Prohibition on Use of Road) Order 2023 (S.S.I. 2023 No. 323)
- The A84 Trunk Road (Main Street, Callander) (Temporary Prohibition on Use of Road) (No. 2) Order 2023 (S.S.I. 2023 No. 324)
- The A87 Trunk Road (Balmacara) (Temporary Prohibition on Use of Road) Order 2023 (S.S.I. 2023 No. 325)
- The M9/A9 Trunk Road (Thurso) (Temporary Prohibition on Use of Road) Order 2023 (S.S.I. 2023 No. 326)
- The A96 Trunk Road (Academy Street, Nairn) (Temporary Prohibition on Use of Road) Order 2023 (S.S.I. 2023 No. 327)
- The A85 Trunk Road (Oban) (Temporary Prohibition on Use of Road) (No. 3) Order 2023 (S.S.I. 2023 No. 328)
- The A83 Trunk Road (Campbeltown) (Temporary Prohibition on Use of Road) (No. 2) Order 2023 (S.S.I. 2023 No. 329)
- The A68 Trunk Road (Cranstoun Church) (Temporary Prohibition on Use of Road) Order 2023 (S.S.I. 2023 No. 330)
- The A78 Trunk Road (Inverkip) (Temporary Prohibition on Use of Road) Order 2023 (S.S.I. 2023 No. 331)
- The Deer (Firearms etc.) (Scotland) Amendment Order 2023 (S.S.I. 2023 No. 332)
- Act of Adjournal (Criminal Procedure Rules 1996 Amendment) (Miscellaneous) 2023 (S.S.I. 2023 No. 333)
- The Deposit and Return Scheme for Scotland (Miscellaneous Amendment) Regulations 2023 (S.S.I. 2023 No. 334)
- The Fly-tipping (Fixed Penalty) (Scotland) Order 2023 (S.S.I. 2023 No. 335)
- The Producer Responsibility Obligations (Packaging Waste) Amendment (Scotland) Regulations 2023 (S.S.I. 2023 No. 336)
- The Food (Scotland) Act 2015 (Compliance Notices) Amendment Regulations 2023 (S.S.I. 2023 No. 337)
- The A83 Trunk Road (Inveraray) (Temporary Prohibition on Use of Road) (No. 3) Order 2023 (S.S.I. 2023 No. 338)
- The Feed Additives (Authorisations) (Scotland) Regulations 2023 (S.S.I. 2023 No. 339)
- The Spring Traps Approval (Scotland) Amendment Order 2023 (S.S.I. 2023 No. 340)
- The A85 Trunk Road (Oban) (Temporary Prohibition on Use of Road) (No. 4) Order 2023 (S.S.I. 2023 No. 341)
- The Transport (Scotland) Act 2019 (Commencement No. 7) Amendment Regulations 2023 (S.S.I. 2023 No. 342 (C. 23))
- The A82 Trunk Road (Fort William) (Temporary Prohibition on Use of Road) Order 2023 (S.S.I. 2023 No. 343)
- The A83 Trunk Road (Campbeltown) (Temporary Prohibition on Use of Road) (No. 3) Order 2023 (S.S.I. 2023 No. 344)
- The A85 Trunk Road (Oban) (Temporary Prohibition on Use of Road) (No. 5) Order 2023 (S.S.I. 2023 No. 345)
- The Disability Assistance (Miscellaneous Amendment) (Scotland) Regulations 2023 (S.S.I. 2023 No. 346)
- The Transport (Scotland) Act 2019 Amendment Regulations 2023 (S.S.I. 2023 No. 347)
- The A83 Trunk Road (Inveraray) (Temporary Prohibition on Use of Road) (No. 3) Order 2023 (S.S.I. 2023 No. 348)
- The North West Scotland Trunk Roads (Temporary Prohibitions of Traffic and Overtaking and Temporary Speed Restrictions) (No. 11) Order 2023 (S.S.I. 2023 No. 349)
- The North East Scotland Trunk Roads (Temporary Prohibitions of Traffic and Overtaking and Temporary Speed Restrictions) (No. 11) Order 2023 (S.S.I. 2023 No. 350)
- The A84 Trunk Road (Callander) (Temporary Prohibition on Use of Road) (No. 2) Order 2023 (S.S.I. 2023 No. 351)
- The South West Scotland Trunk Roads (Temporary Prohibitions of Traffic and Overtaking and Temporary Speed Restrictions) (No. 8) Order 2023 (S.S.I. 2023 No. 352)
- The M77/A77 Trunk Road (Girvan) (Temporary Prohibition on Use of Road) Order 2023 (S.S.I. 2023 No. 353)
- The M90/A90/A9000 Trunk Road (Fraserburgh) (Temporary Prohibition on Use of Road) Order 2023 (S.S.I. 2023 No. 354)
- The M8 (Newhouse to Easterhouse) M73 (Maryville to Mollinsburn) A8 (Newhouse to Bargeddie) A725 (Shawhead to Whistleberry) Trunk Roads (Temporary Prohibitions of Traffic and Overtaking and Temporary Speed Restrictions) (No. 4) Order 2023 (S.S.I. 2023 No. 355)
- The Mental Health (National Secure Adolescent Inpatient Service: Miscellaneous Amendments) (Scotland) Regulations 2023 (S.S.I. 2023 No. 356)
- The Budget (Scotland) Act 2023 Amendment Regulations 2023 (S.S.I. 2023 No. 357)
- The Heat Networks (Supply Targets) (Scotland) Regulations 2023 (S.S.I. 2023 No. 358)
- The South East Scotland Trunk Roads (Temporary Prohibitions of Traffic and Overtaking and Temporary Speed Restrictions) (No. 11) Order 2023 (S.S.I. 2023 No. 359)
- The Coronavirus (Recovery and Reform) (Scotland) Act 2022 (Extension and Expiry of Temporary Justice Measures) Regulations 2023 (S.S.I. 2023 No. 360)
- The Avian Influenza and Influenza of Avian Origin in Mammals (Scotland) Amendment Order 2023 (S.S.I. 2023 No. 361)
- The Good Food Nation (Scotland) Act 2022 (Commencement No. 1) Amendment Regulations 2023 (S.S.I. 2023 No. 362 (C. 24))
- The Colleges of Further Education and Regional Strategic Bodies (Membership of Boards) (Scotland) Order 2023 (S.S.I. 2023 No. 363)
- The Gender Recognition (Disclosure of Information) (Scotland) Order 2023 (S.S.I. 2023 No. 364)
- The A84/A85 Trunk Road (Main Street, Callander) (Temporary Prohibition on Waiting, Loading and Unloading) (No. 2) Order 2023 (S.S.I. 2023 No. 365)
- The Prisons and Young Offenders Institutions (Scotland) Amendment Rules 2023 (S.S.I. 2023 No. 366)
- The Meat Preparations (Import Conditions) (Scotland) Amendment Regulations 2023 (S.S.I. 2023 No. 367)
- The Bus Services Improvement Partnerships and Local Services Franchises (Provision of Information) (Scotland) Regulations 2023 (S.S.I. 2023 No. 368)
- The Firefighters’ Pension Scheme (Scotland) Amendment Regulations 2023 (S.S.I. 2023 No. 369)
- The Bovine Semen (Scotland) Amendment Regulations 2023 (S.S.I. 2023 No. 370)
- The Welfare Foods (Best Start Foods) (Scotland) Amendment Regulations 2023 (S.S.I. 2023 No. 371)
- The Conservation of Salmon (Scotland) Amendment Regulations 2023 (S.S.I. 2023 No. 372)
- The Parking Prohibitions (Enforcement and Accounts) (Scotland) Regulations 2023 (S.S.I. 2023 No. 373)
- The Retained EU Law (Revocation and Reform) Act 2023 (Consequential Amendments) (Scotland) Regulations 2023 (S.S.I. 2023 No. 374)
- The Equality Act 2010 (Specific Duties) (Use of Member Information) (Scotland) Revocation Regulations 2023 (S.S.I. 2023 No. 375)
- The International Organisations (Immunities and Privileges) (Scotland) Amendment (No. 2) Order 2023 (S.S.I. 2023 No. 376)
- The Plant Health (Fees) (Forestry) (Scotland) (Amendment) Regulations 2023 (S.S.I. 2023 No. 377)
- The Quality Meat Scotland (Amendment) Order 2023 (S.S.I. 2023 No. 378)
- The A85 Trunk Road (Comrie) (Temporary Prohibition on Use of Road) (No. 5) Order 2023 (S.S.I. 2023 No. 379)
- The M77 Trunk Road (Dumbreck) (Temporary 40mph Speed Restriction) Order 2023 (S.S.I. 2023 No. 380)
- The A78 Trunk Road (Largs) (Temporary Prohibition on Waiting, Loading and Unloading) Order 2023 (S.S.I. 2023 No. 381)
- The A725 Trunk Road (Craighead) (Temporary 40mph Speed Restriction) Order 2023 (S.S.I. 2023 No. 382)
- The M8 Trunk Road (Junction 12, Riddrie) (Westbound, East of Gartcraig Bridge) (Junction 26, Hillington) (Temporary 40mph and 50mph Speed Restrictions) Order 2023 (S.S.I. 2023 No. 383)
- The M8 Trunk Road (Junction 15, Townhead) (Temporary 40mph Speed Restriction) Order 2023 (S.S.I. 2023 No. 384)
- The North East Scotland Trunk Roads (Temporary Prohibitions of Traffic and Overtaking and Temporary Speed Restrictions) (No. 12) Order 2023 (S.S.I. 2023 No. 385)
- The North West Scotland Trunk Roads (Temporary Prohibitions of Traffic and Overtaking and Temporary Speed Restrictions) (No. 12) Order 2023 (S.S.I. 2023 No. 386)
- The South East Scotland Trunk Roads (Temporary Prohibitions of Traffic and Overtaking and Temporary Speed Restrictions) (No. 12) Order 2023 (S.S.I. 2023 No. 387)
- The M8 (Newhouse to Easterhouse) M73 (Maryville to Mollinsburn) M74 (Daldowie to Hamilton) A8 (Newhouse to Bargeddie) A725 (Shawhead to Whistleberry) A7071 (Bellshill) Trunk Roads (Temporary Prohibitions of Traffic and Overtaking and Temporary Speed Restrictions) (No. 4) Order 2023 (S.S.I. 2023 No. 388)
- The Council Tax (Variation for Unoccupied Dwellings) (Scotland) Amendment Regulations 2023 (S.S.I. 2023 No. 389)
- The A68 (Lauder and Jedburgh) A6091/A7 (Selkirk and Hawick) A702 (West Linton and Carlops) Trunk Roads (Temporary 20mph Speed Restriction) Order 2023 (S.S.I. 2023 No. 390)
- The Importation of Animals and Related Products (Miscellaneous Amendment and Revocation) (Scotland) Order 2023 (S.S.I. 2023 No. 391)
