= List of Scottish statutory instruments, 2018 =

This is a complete list of Scottish statutory instruments in 2018.

== 1-100 ==
- The First-tier Tribunal for Scotland (Transfer of Functions of the Scottish Charity Appeals Panel) Regulations 2018 (S.S.I. 2018 No. 1)
- The First-tier Tribunal for Scotland General Regulatory Chamber Charity Appeals Cases and Upper Tribunal for Scotland (Composition) Regulations 2018 (S.S.I. 2018 No. 2)
- The First-tier Tribunal for Scotland Health and Education Chamber and Upper Tribunal for Scotland (Composition) Regulations 2018 (S.S.I. 2018 No. 3)
- The First-tier Tribunal for Scotland (Transfer of Functions of the Additional Support Needs Tribunals for Scotland) Regulations 2018 (S.S.I. 2018 No. 4)
- The Public Records (Scotland) Act 2011 (Authorities) Amendment Order 2018 (S.S.I. 2018 No. 5)
- The Education (Recognised Bodies) (Scotland) Order 2018 (S.S.I. 2018 No. 6)
- The Education (Listed Bodies) (Scotland) Order 2018 (S.S.I. 2018 No. 7)
- The Contract (Third Party Rights) (Scotland) Act 2017 (Commencement) Regulations 2018 (S.S.I. 2018 No. 8 (C. 1))
- The Human Trafficking and Exploitation (Scotland) Act 2015 (Commencement No. 4) Regulations 2018 (S.S.I. 2018 No. 9 (C. 2))
- The A9 Trunk Road (Scrabster) (Temporary Prohibition on Use of Road) Order 2018 (S.S.I. 2018 No. 10)
- The A92 Trunk Road (Freuchie Mill Road, Dundee) (Temporary Prohibition of Specified Turns) Order 2018 (S.S.I. 2018 No. 11)
- Act of Adjournal (Criminal Procedure Rules 1996 Amendment) (Miscellaneous) 2018 (S.S.I. 2018 No. 12)
- The A9 Trunk Road (Kincraig to Dalraddy Dualling) (Temporary Prohibition of Traffic and Overtaking) Revocation Order 2018 (S.S.I. 2018 No. 13)
- The A9 Trunk Road (Kincraig to Dalraddy Dualling) (Temporary 40 mph Speed Restriction) Revocation Order 2018 (S.S.I. 2018 No. 14)
- The Animal Feed (Basic Safety Standards) (Scotland) Regulations 2018 (S.S.I. 2018 No. 15)
- The Community Care (Provision of Residential Accommodation Outwith Scotland) (Scotland) Amendment Regulations 2018 (revoked) (S.S.I. 2018 No. 16)
- The South East Scotland Trunk Roads (Temporary Prohibitions of Traffic and Overtaking and Temporary Speed Restrictions) Order 2018 (S.S.I. 2018 No. 17)
- The South West Scotland Trunk Roads (Temporary Prohibitions of Traffic and Overtaking and Temporary Speed Restrictions) Order 2018 (S.S.I. 2018 No. 18)
- The North East Scotland Trunk Roads (Temporary Prohibitions of Traffic and Overtaking and Temporary Speed Restrictions) Order 2018 (S.S.I. 2018 No. 19)
- The North West Scotland Trunk Roads (Temporary Prohibitions of Traffic and Overtaking and Temporary Speed Restrictions) Order 2018 (S.S.I. 2018 No. 20)
- The A9 Trunk Road (Glassingall, Dunblane) (Temporary Prohibition of Specified Turns) Order 2018 (S.S.I. 2018 No. 21)
- The Plant Health (Import Inspection Fees) (Scotland) Amendment Regulations 2018 (S.S.I. 2018 No. 22)
- The M8 (Newhouse to Easterhouse) M73 (Maryville to Mollinsburn) M74 (Daldowie to Hamilton) A8 (Newhouse to Bargeddie) A725 (Shawhead to Whistleberry) A7071 (Bellshill) Trunk Roads (Temporary Prohibitions of Traffic and Overtaking and Temporary Speed Restrictions) Order 2018 (S.S.I. 2018 No. 23)
- The A84/A85 Trunk Road (Ancaster Square, Callander) (Temporary Prohibition On Use of Road) Order 2018 (S.S.I. 2018 No. 24)
- The Carers (Scotland) Act 2016 (Commencement No. 3) Regulations 2018 (S.S.I. 2018 No. 25 (C. 3))
- The Health (Tobacco, Nicotine etc. and Care) (Scotland) Act 2016 (Commencement No. 3) Regulations 2018 (S.S.I. 2018 No. 26 (C. 4))
- The Functions of Health Boards and Special Health Boards (Scotland) (Miscellaneous Amendments) Order 2018 (S.S.I. 2018 No. 27)
- The Protection of Vulnerable Groups (Scotland) Act 2007 (Prescribed Services) (Protected Adults) Amendment Regulations 2018 (S.S.I. 2018 No. 28)
- The Self-directed Support (Direct Payments) (Scotland) Amendment Regulations 2018 (S.S.I. 2018 No. 29)
- The A85 Trunk Road (Inveraray Junction, Loch Awe) (Temporary Prohibition of Specified Turns) Order 2018 (S.S.I. 2018 No. 30)
- The Carers (Waiving of Charges for Support) (Scotland) Amendment Regulations 2018 (S.S.I. 2018 No. 31)
- The Carers (Scotland) Act 2016 (Short Breaks Services Statements) Regulations 2018 (S.S.I. 2018 No. 32)
- The Carers (Scotland) Act 2016 (Review of Adult Carer Support Plan and Young Carer Statement) Regulations 2018 (S.S.I. 2018 No. 33)
- The Carers (Scotland) Act 2016 (Transitional Provisions) Regulations 2018 (S.S.I. 2018 No. 34)
- The A68 Trunk Road (Jedburgh) (30 mph and 40 mph Speed Limit) Order 2018 (S.S.I. 2018 No. 35)
- The Education (Scotland) Act 2016 (Commencement No. 5 and Savings Provision) Regulations 2018 (S.S.I. 2018 No. 36 (C. 5))
- The Conservation of Salmon (Scotland) Amendment Regulations 2018 (S.S.I. 2018 No. 37)
- The Local Governance (Scotland) Act 2004 (Remuneration) Amendment Regulations 2018 (S.S.I. 2018 No. 38)
- The Council Tax (Discounts) (Scotland) Amendment Regulations 2018 (S.S.I. 2018 No. 39)
- The Carbon Accounting Scheme (Scotland) Amendment Regulations 2018 (S.S.I. 2018 No. 40)
- The National Assistance (Sums for Personal Requirements) (Scotland) Regulations 2018 (revoked) (S.S.I. 2018 No. 41)
- The Community Care (Provision of Residential Accommodation Outwith Scotland) (Scotland) Amendment (No. 2) Regulations 2018 (S.S.I. 2018 No. 42)
- The National Assistance (Assessment of Resources) Amendment (Scotland) Regulations 2018 (revoked) (S.S.I. 2018 No. 43)
- The Disabled Persons (Badges for Motor Vehicles) (Scotland) Amendment Regulations 2018 (S.S.I. 2018 No. 44)
- The Council Tax (Exempt Dwellings) (Scotland) Amendment Order 2018 (S.S.I. 2018 No. 45)
- The Non-Domestic Rate (Scotland) Order 2018 (S.S.I. 2018 No. 46)
- The Personal Injuries (NHS Charges) (Amounts) (Scotland) Amendment Regulations 2018 (S.S.I. 2018 No. 47)
- The A83 Trunk Road (Rest and Be Thankful) (Temporary Prohibition on Use of Road) Order 2018 (S.S.I. 2018 No. 48)
- The Premises Licence (Scotland) Amendment Regulations 2018 (S.S.I. 2018 No. 49)
- The Scottish Road Works Register (Prescribed Fees) Amendment Regulations 2018 (revoked) (S.S.I. 2018 No. 50)
- The Rehabilitation of Offenders Act 1974 (Exclusions and Exceptions) (Scotland) Amendment Order 2018 (S.S.I. 2018 No. 51)
- The Police Act 1997 and the Protection of Vulnerable Groups (Scotland) Act 2007 Remedial Order 2018 (S.S.I. 2018 No. 52)
- The Regulation of Investigatory Powers (Covert Human Intelligence Sources – Code of Practice) (Scotland) Order 2018 (S.S.I. 2018 No. 53)
- The Regulation of Investigatory Powers (Covert Surveillance and Property Interference – Code of Practice) (Scotland) Order 2018 (S.S.I. 2018 No. 54)
- The Regulation of Investigatory Powers (Equipment Interference – Code of Practice) (Scotland) Order 2018 (S.S.I. 2018 No. 55)
- The Health (Tobacco, Nicotine etc. and Care) (Scotland) Act 2016 (Commencement No. 4) Regulations 2018 (S.S.I. 2018 No. 56 (C. 6))
- The Duty of Candour Procedure (Scotland) Regulations 2018 (S.S.I. 2018 No. 57)
- The A78 Trunk Road (Wemyss Bay) (Temporary Prohibition on Waiting, Loading and Unloading) Order 2018 (S.S.I. 2018 No. 58)
- The A77 Trunk Road (Maybole) (Temporary Prohibition on Waiting, Loading and Unloading) Order 2018 (S.S.I. 2018 No. 59)
- The Road Traffic (Permitted Parking Area and Special Parking Area) (Midlothian Council) Designation Order 2018 (S.S.I. 2018 No. 60)
- The Parking Attendants (Wearing of Uniforms) (Midlothian Council Parking Area) Regulations 2018 (S.S.I. 2018 No. 61)
- The Road Traffic (Parking Adjudicators) (Midlothian Council) Regulations 2018 (revoked) (S.S.I. 2018 No. 62)
- The Non-Domestic Rates (Telecommunication Installations) (Scotland) Amendment Regulations 2018 (S.S.I. 2018 No. 63)
- The Non-Domestic Rates (Renewable Energy Generation Relief) (Scotland) Amendment Regulations 2018 (S.S.I. 2018 No. 64)
- The Non-Domestic Rates (Day Nursery Relief) (Scotland) Regulations 2018 (S.S.I. 2018 No. 65)
- The National Health Service (General Medical Services Contracts) (Scotland) Regulations 2018 (S.S.I. 2018 No. 66)
- The National Health Service (Primary Medical Services Section 17C Agreements) (Scotland) Regulations 2018 (S.S.I. 2018 No. 67)
- The National Health Service (Pharmaceutical Services) (Scotland) Amendment Regulations 2018 (S.S.I. 2018 No. 68)
- The Council Tax Reduction (Scotland) Amendment Regulations 2018 (S.S.I. 2018 No. 69)
- The A9 Trunk Road (McDiarmid Park) (Temporary 30 mph Speed Restriction) Order 2018 (S.S.I. 2018 No. 70)
- The A82 Trunk Road (Drumnadrochit and Lewiston) (Temporary 30 mph Speed Restriction) Order 2018 (S.S.I. 2018 No. 71)
- The Registers of Scotland (Digital Registration, etc.) Regulations 2018 (S.S.I. 2018 No. 72)
- The Lobbying (Scotland) Act 2016 (Commencement No. 2) Regulations 2018 (S.S.I. 2018 No. 73 (C. 7))
- The Non-Domestic Rates (Levying) (Scotland) Regulations 2018 (revoked) (S.S.I. 2018 No. 74)
- The Non-Domestic Rates (New and Improved Properties) (Scotland) Regulations 2018 (S.S.I. 2018 No. 75)
- The Non-Domestic Rates (Transitional Relief) Amendment (Scotland) Regulations 2018 (S.S.I. 2018 No. 76)
- The Non-Domestic Rating (Unoccupied Property) (Scotland) Regulations 2018 (S.S.I. 2018 No. 77)
- The South East Scotland Trunk Roads (Temporary Prohibitions of Traffic and Overtaking and Temporary Speed Restrictions) (No. 2) Order 2018 (S.S.I. 2018 No. 78)
- The North East Scotland Trunk Roads (Temporary Prohibitions of Traffic and Overtaking and Temporary Speed Restrictions) (No. 2) Order 2018 (S.S.I. 2018 No. 79)
- The North West Scotland Trunk Roads (Temporary Prohibitions of Traffic and Overtaking and Temporary Speed Restrictions) (No. 2) Order 2018 (S.S.I. 2018 No. 80)
- The Sheriff Court Fees Order 2018 (revoked) (S.S.I. 2018 No. 81)
- The Sheriff Appeal Court Fees Order 2018 (revoked) (S.S.I. 2018 No. 82)
- The Court of Session etc. Fees Order 2018 (revoked) (S.S.I. 2018 No. 83)
- The High Court of Justiciary Fees Order 2018 (revoked) (S.S.I. 2018 No. 84)
- The Justice of the Peace Court Fees (Scotland) Order 2018 (revoked) (S.S.I. 2018 No. 85)
- The Adults with Incapacity (Public Guardian's Fees) (Scotland) Regulations 2018 (revoked) (S.S.I. 2018 No. 86)
- The Scottish Landfill Tax (Standard Rate and Lower Rate) Order 2018 (revoked) (S.S.I. 2018 No. 87)
- The Alcohol (Minimum Pricing) (Scotland) Act 2012 (Commencement No. 2) Order 2018 (S.S.I. 2018 No. 88 (C. 8))
- The Representation of the People (Scotland) Amendment Regulations 2018 (S.S.I. 2018 No. 89)
- The Human Trafficking and Exploitation (Scotland) Act 2015 (Support for Victims) Regulations 2018 (S.S.I. 2018 No. 90)
- The Local Government Finance (Scotland) Order 2018 (S.S.I. 2018 No. 91)
- The A92 Trunk Road (Freuchie Mill Road, Dundee) (Temporary Prohibition of Specified Turns) (No. 2) Order 2018 (S.S.I. 2018 No. 92)
- The Courts Reform (Scotland) Act 2014 (Consequential and Supplemental Provisions) Order 2018 (S.S.I. 2018 No. 93)
- The National Health Service (General Medical Services Contracts and Primary Medical Services Section 17C Agreements) (Scotland) Amendment Regulations 2018 (S.S.I. 2018 No. 94)
- The A83 Trunk Road (Inveraray) (Temporary Prohibition of Traffic) Order 2018 (S.S.I. 2018 No. 95)
- The Continuing Care (Scotland) Amendment Order 2018 (revoked) (S.S.I. 2018 No. 96)
- The Community Empowerment (Scotland) Act 2015 (Supplementary and Consequential Provisions) Order 2018 (S.S.I. 2018 No. 97)
- The National Bus Travel Concession Scheme for Older and Disabled Persons (Scotland) Amendment Order 2018 (S.S.I. 2018 No. 98)
- The Land Reform (Scotland) Act 2016 (Commencement No. 7) Regulations 2018 (S.S.I. 2018 No. 99 (C. 9))
- The Loch Carron Urgent Marine Conservation (No. 2) Order 2017 (Urgent Continuation) Order 2018 (revoked) (S.S.I. 2018 No. 100)

== 101-200 ==
- The Equality Act 2010 (Authorities subject to the Socio-economic Inequality Duty) (Scotland) Regulations 2018 (S.S.I. 2018 No. 101)
- The Criminal Justice and Licensing (Scotland) Act 2010 (Commencement No. 15 and Saving Provision) and the Air Weapons and Licensing (Scotland) Act 2015 (Commencement No. 8) Order 2018 (S.S.I. 2018 No. 102 (C. 10))
- The A85 Trunk Road (Comrie) (Temporary Prohibition On Use of Road) Order 2018 (S.S.I. 2018 No. 103)
- The South West Scotland Trunk Roads (Temporary Prohibitions of Traffic and Overtaking and Temporary Speed Restrictions) (No. 2) Order 2018 (S.S.I. 2018 No. 104)
- The North West Scotland Trunk Roads (Temporary Prohibitions of Traffic and Overtaking and Temporary Speed Restrictions) (No. 3) Order 2018 (S.S.I. 2018 No. 105)
- The South East Scotland Trunk Roads (Temporary Prohibitions of Traffic and Overtaking and Temporary Speed Restrictions) (No. 3) Order 2018 (S.S.I. 2018 No. 106)
- The North East Scotland Trunk Roads (Temporary Prohibitions of Traffic and Overtaking and Temporary Speed Restrictions) (No. 3) Order 2018 (S.S.I. 2018 No. 107)
- The M8 (Newhouse to Easterhouse) M73 (Maryville to Mollinsburn) M74 (Daldowie to Hamilton) A8 (Newhouse to Bargeddie) A725 (Shawhead to Whistleberry) A7071 (Bellshill) Trunk Roads (Temporary Prohibitions of Traffic and Overtaking and Temporary Speed Restrictions) (No. 2) Order 2018 (S.S.I. 2018 No. 108)
- The Carers (Scotland) Act 2016 (Adult Carers and Young Carers: Identification of Outcomes and Needs for Support) Regulations 2018 (S.S.I. 2018 No. 109)
- The Town and Country Planning (Fees for Applications and Deemed Applications) (Scotland) Amendment Regulations 2018 (revoked) (S.S.I. 2018 No. 110)
- The Community Care (Personal Care and Nursing Care) (Scotland) Amendment Regulations 2018 (revoked) (S.S.I. 2018 No. 111)
- The Plant Health (Scotland) Amendment Order 2018 (revoked) (S.S.I. 2018 No. 112)
- The Budget (Scotland) Act 2017 Amendment Regulations 2018 (S.S.I. 2018 No. 113)
- The Proceeds of Crime Act 2002 (Searches under Part 5: Constables in Scotland: Code of Practice) Order 2018 (S.S.I. 2018 No. 114)
- The Letting Agents (Notice Requiring Information) (Scotland) Regulations 2018 (S.S.I. 2018 No. 115)
- The A82 Trunk Road (Tomnahurich Street, Inverness) (Temporary Prohibition on Waiting, Loading and Unloading) Order 2018 (S.S.I. 2018 No. 116)
- The A835/A893 Trunk Road (Glascarnoch) (Temporary Prohibition of Traffic) Order 2018 (S.S.I. 2018 No. 117)
- The A8 Trunk Road (Gibbshill Road to Sinclair Street, Greenock) (Temporary Prohibition of Specified Turns) Order 2018 (S.S.I. 2018 No. 118)
- The A90/A9000 Trunk Road (Forth Road Bridge) (Prohibitions on Use and Stopping) Order 2018 (S.S.I. 2018 No. 119)
- The A90 Trunk Road (Forth Road Bridge and Queensferry Crossing Approach Roads) (Prohibitions on Use and Stopping and Bus Lane) Order 2018 (S.S.I. 2018 No. 120)
- The A90/A9000 Trunk Roads (Forth Road Bridge, and Queensferry Crossing and Forth Road Bridge Approach Roads) (Speed Limits) Order 2018 (S.S.I. 2018 No. 121)
- The Common Agricultural Policy (Miscellaneous Amendments) (Scotland) Regulations 2018 (S.S.I. 2018 No. 122)
- The National Health Service Superannuation Scheme (Scotland) (Miscellaneous Amendments) (No. 2) Regulations 2017 Amendment Regulations 2018 (S.S.I. 2018 No. 123)
- The National Health Service Pension Scheme (Scotland) (Additional Voluntary Contributions) Regulations 2018 (S.S.I. 2018 No. 124)
- The A9 Trunk Road (Scrabster) (Temporary Prohibition on Use of Road) (No. 2) Order 2018 (S.S.I. 2018 No. 125)
- Act of Sederunt (Fees of Messengers-at-Arms, Sheriff Officers and Shorthand Writers) (Amendment) 2018 (S.S.I. 2018 No. 126)
- The Bankruptcy Fees (Scotland) Regulations 2018 (S.S.I. 2018 No. 127)
- The South East Scotland Trunk Roads (Temporary Prohibitions of Traffic and Overtaking and Temporary Speed Restrictions) (No. 4) Order 2018 (S.S.I. 2018 No. 128)
- The South West Scotland Trunk Roads (Temporary Prohibitions of Traffic and Overtaking and Temporary Speed Restrictions) (No. 3) Order 2018 (S.S.I. 2018 No. 129)
- The North West Scotland Trunk Roads (Temporary Prohibitions of Traffic and Overtaking and Temporary Speed Restrictions) (No. 4) Order 2018 (S.S.I. 2018 No. 130)
- The North East Scotland Trunk Roads (Temporary Prohibitions of Traffic and Overtaking and Temporary Speed Restrictions) (No. 4) Order 2018 (S.S.I. 2018 No. 131)
- The Plant Health (Export Certification) (Scotland) Order 2018 (S.S.I. 2018 No. 132)
- The M8 (Newhouse to Easterhouse) M73 (Maryville to Mollinsburn) M74 (Daldowie to Hamilton) A8 (Newhouse to Bargeddie) A725 (Shawhead to Whistleberry) Trunk Roads (Temporary Prohibitions of Traffic and Overtaking and Temporary Speed Restrictions) Order 2018 (S.S.I. 2018 No. 133)
- The A6091/A7 Trunk Road (Borders General Hospital) (Temporary 40 mph Speed Restriction) Order 2018 (S.S.I. 2018 No. 134)
- The Alcohol (Minimum Price per Unit) (Scotland) Order 2018 (S.S.I. 2018 No. 135)
- The A85 Trunk Road (Oban) (Temporary Prohibition on Use of Road) Order 2018 (S.S.I. 2018 No. 136)
- The Community Right to Buy (Abandoned, Neglected or Detrimental Land) (Compensation) (Scotland) Order 2018 (S.S.I. 2018 No. 137)
- The Land Reform (Scotland) Act 2016 (Commencement No. 8 and Saving Provision) Regulations 2018 (S.S.I. 2018 No. 138 (C. 11))
- The Community Empowerment (Scotland) Act 2015 (Commencement No. 11) Order 2018 (S.S.I. 2018 No. 139 (C. 12))
- The Community Right to Buy (Abandoned, Neglected or Detrimental Land) (Applications, Ballots and Miscellaneous Provisions) (Scotland) Regulations 2018 (S.S.I. 2018 No. 140)
- The Local Government Pension Scheme (Scotland) Regulations 2018 (S.S.I. 2018 No. 141)
- The Town and Country Planning (General Permitted Development) (Scotland) Amendment Order 2018 (S.S.I. 2018 No. 142)
- The A68 Trunk Road (Edinburgh Road, Jedburgh) (Temporary Prohibition on Waiting and 30 mph Speed Restriction) Order 2018 (S.S.I. 2018 No. 143)
- The A830 Trunk Road (Arisaig to Mallaig) (Temporary Prohibition On Use of Road and Temporary 30 mph Speed Restriction) Order 2018 (S.S.I. 2018 No. 144)
- The A99 Trunk Road (Francis Street, Wick) (Temporary Prohibition on Waiting, Loading and Unloading) Order 2018 (S.S.I. 2018 No. 145)
- The A92 Trunk Road (Kilmany) (Temporary 30 mph and 20 mph Speed Restrictions and Temporary Prohibition on Use of Road) Order 2018 (S.S.I. 2018 No. 146)
- The A85 Trunk Road (New Fowlis) (Temporary 30 mph and 20 mph Speed Restrictions and Temporary Prohibition on Use of Road) Order 2018 (S.S.I. 2018 No. 147)
- The Ethical Standards in Public Life etc. (Scotland) Act 2000 (ILF Scotland) Order 2018 (S.S.I. 2018 No. 148)
- The Wild Animals in Travelling Circuses (Scotland) Act 2018 (Commencement) Regulations 2018 (S.S.I. 2018 No. 149 (C. 13))
- Act of Adjournal (Criminal Procedure Rules 1996 Amendment) (European Investigation Orders) 2018 (S.S.I. 2018 No. 150)
- The National Health Service (Free Prescriptions and Charges for Drugs and Appliances) (Scotland) Amendment Regulations 2018 (revoked) (S.S.I. 2018 No. 151)
- The Seed (Fees) (Scotland) Regulations 2018 (S.S.I. 2018 No. 152)
- The Housing (Scotland) Act 2014 (Commencement No. 8, Savings, Transitional and Supplemental Provisions) Order 2018 (S.S.I. 2018 No. 153 (C. 14))
- The Short Scottish Secure Tenancies (Notice) Regulations 2018 (S.S.I. 2018 No. 154)
- The Short Scottish Secure Tenancies (Proceedings for Possession) Regulations 2018 (S.S.I. 2018 No. 155)
- The Scottish Secure Tenancies (Proceedings for Possession) (Form of Notice) Amendment Regulations 2018 (S.S.I. 2018 No. 156)
- The Burial and Cremation (Scotland) Act 2016 (Commencement No. 2) Regulations 2018 (S.S.I. 2018 No. 157 (C. 15))
- The Courts Reform (Scotland) Act 2014 (Regulation of Fees) (Specified Persons) Order 2018 (S.S.I. 2018 No. 158)
- The A6091/A7 Trunk Road (Borders General Hospital) (50 mph Speed Limit) Order 2018 (S.S.I. 2018 No. 159)
- The Late Payment of Commercial Debts (Scotland) Amendment Regulations 2018 (S.S.I. 2018 No. 160)
- The Traffic Signs Amendment (Scotland) Regulations and General Directions 2018 (S.S.I. 2018 No. 161)
- The Environmental Protection (Microbeads) (Scotland) Regulations 2018 (S.S.I. 2018 No. 162)
- The Tenements (Scotland) Act 2004 (Heating Services) Regulations 2018 (S.S.I. 2018 No. 163)
- The Tuberculosis (Miscellaneous Amendments) (Scotland) Order 2018 (revoked) (S.S.I. 2018 No. 164)
- The A702 Trunk Road (Penicuik Rideout) (Temporary Prohibition on Use of Road) Order 2018 (S.S.I. 2018 No. 165)
- The A85 Trunk Road (Oban) (Temporary Prohibition on Use of Road) (No. 2) Order 2018 (S.S.I. 2018 No. 166)
- The A6091/A7 Trunk Road (Borders General Hospital) (Temporary 40 mph Speed Restriction) (No. 2) Order 2018 (S.S.I. 2018 No. 167)
- The South East Scotland Trunk Roads (Temporary Prohibitions of Traffic and Overtaking and Temporary Speed Restrictions) (No. 5) Order 2018 (S.S.I. 2018 No. 168)
- The North West Scotland Trunk Roads (Temporary Prohibitions of Traffic and Overtaking and Temporary Speed Restrictions) (No. 5) Order 2018 (S.S.I. 2018 No. 169)
- The Edinburgh Napier University Amendment Order of Council 2018 (S.S.I. 2018 No. 170)
- The Education (Fees and Student Support) (Miscellaneous Amendments) (Scotland) Regulations 2018 (S.S.I. 2018 No. 171)
- The Scottish Fire and Rescue Service (Appointment of Chief Inspector) Order 2018 (revoked) (S.S.I. 2018 No. 172)
- The North East Scotland Trunk Roads (Temporary Prohibitions of Traffic and Overtaking and Temporary Speed Restrictions) (No. 5) Order 2018 (S.S.I. 2018 No. 173)
- The M876/A876 Trunk Road (Kincardine Bridge) (Temporary Prohibition of Specified Turns) Order 2018 (S.S.I. 2018 No. 174)
- The Marketing of Fruit Plant and Propagating Material (Fees) (Scotland) Regulations 2018 (S.S.I. 2018 No. 175)
- The Animal By-Products and Pet Passport Fees (Scotland) Regulations 2018 (S.S.I. 2018 No. 176)
- The Animal Health (Miscellaneous Fees) (Scotland) Regulations 2018 (S.S.I. 2018 No. 177)
- The M8 (Newhouse to Easterhouse), M73 (Maryville to Mollinsburn), A8 (Newhouse to Bargeddie) and A725 (Shawhead to Whistleberry) Trunk Roads (Temporary Prohibitions of Traffic and Overtaking and Temporary Speed Restrictions) Order 2018 (S.S.I. 2018 No. 178)
- The A90 Trunk Road (Aberdeen Western Peripheral Route) (Blackdog to Goval) (Temporary 40 mph & 50 mph Speed Restrictions) Order 2018 (S.S.I. 2018 No. 179)
- The A83 Trunk Road (Inveraray) (Temporary Prohibition on Use of Road) Order 2018 (S.S.I. 2018 No. 180)
- The A9 Trunk Road (McDiarmid Park) (Temporary 30 mph Speed Restriction) (No. 2) Order 2018 (S.S.I. 2018 No. 181)
- The Beef and Pig Carcase Classification (Scotland) Amendment Regulations 2018 (S.S.I. 2018 No. 182)
- The A977 Trunk Road (Tulliallan Police College, Fife) (Temporary Prohibition on Use of Road) Order 2018 (S.S.I. 2018 No. 183)
- The A87 Trunk Road (Portree to Prabost) (Temporary Prohibition On Use of Road) Order 2018 (S.S.I. 2018 No. 184)
- The A83 Trunk Road (Poltalloch Street, Lochgilphead) (Temporary Prohibition on Use of Road) Order 2018 (S.S.I. 2018 No. 185)
- Act of Sederunt (Fees of Solicitors in the Court of Session, Sheriff Appeal Court and Sheriff Court) (Amendment) 2018 (S.S.I. 2018 No. 186)
- The M9/A9 Trunk Road (Inveralmond) (Temporary Prohibition of Specified Turns) Order 2018 (S.S.I. 2018 No. 187)
- The Dumfries and Galloway Council (Kirkcudbright) Harbour Revision Order 2018 (S.S.I. 2018 No. 188)
- The A78 Trunk Road (High Street, Greenock) (Temporary Prohibition of Specified Turns) Order 2018 (S.S.I. 2018 No. 189)
- The A7 Trunk Road (Muckle Toon Half Marathon and 10k) (Temporary Prohibition on Use of Road) Order 2018 (S.S.I. 2018 No. 190)
- Act of Sederunt (Simple Procedure Amendment) (Miscellaneous) 2018 (S.S.I. 2018 No. 191)
- The Regulatory Reform (Specification of Basic Safety Standards Directive) (Scotland) Order 2018 (revoked) (S.S.I. 2018 No. 192)
- The Legal Aid (Employment of Solicitors) (Scotland) Amendment Regulations 2018 (S.S.I. 2018 No. 193)
- The Sheriff Court Fees Amendment Order 2018 (revoked) (S.S.I. 2018 No. 194)
- The Seat Belts on School Transport (Scotland) Act 2017 (Commencement) Regulations 2018 (S.S.I. 2018 No. 195 (C. 16))
- The Letting Agent Registration (Scotland) Amendment Regulations 2018 (S.S.I. 2018 No. 196)
- The A68 Trunk Road (Edinburgh Road, Jedburgh) (Temporary Prohibition on Waiting and 30 mph Speed Restriction) (No. 2) Order 2018 (S.S.I. 2018 No. 197)
- The A85 Trunk Road (Comrie) (Temporary Prohibition On Use of Road) (No. 2) Order 2018 (S.S.I. 2018 No. 198)
- The A83 Trunk Road (Campbeltown) (Temporary Prohibition on Use of Road, Waiting, Loading and Unloading) Order 2018 (S.S.I. 2018 No. 199)
- The Community Care (Personal Care and Nursing Care) (Scotland) Amendment (No. 2) Regulations 2018 (S.S.I. 2018 No. 200)

== 201-300 ==
- The Community Right to Buy (Abandoned, Neglected or Detrimental Land) (Eligible Land, Regulators and Restrictions on Transfers and Dealing) (Scotland) Regulations 2018 (S.S.I. 2018 No. 201)
- The Tuberculosis (Miscellaneous Amendments) (Scotland) Revocation Order 2018 (S.S.I. 2018 No. 202)
- The South West Scotland Trunk Roads (Temporary Prohibitions of Traffic and Overtaking and Temporary Speed Restrictions) (No. 4) Order 2018 (S.S.I. 2018 No. 203)
- The South East Scotland Trunk Roads (Temporary Prohibitions of Traffic and Overtaking and Temporary Speed Restrictions) (No. 6) Order 2018 (S.S.I. 2018 No. 204)
- The North West Scotland Trunk Roads (Temporary Prohibitions of Traffic and Overtaking and Temporary Speed Restrictions) (No. 6) Order 2018 (S.S.I. 2018 No. 205)
- The North East Scotland Trunk Roads (Temporary Prohibitions of Traffic and Overtaking and Temporary Speed Restrictions) (No. 6) Order 2018 (S.S.I. 2018 No. 206)
- The Comhairle nan Eilean Siar (Various Harbours) Harbour Revision (Amendment) Order 2018 (S.S.I. 2018 No. 207)
- The A83 Trunk Road (Kinloch Road, Campbeltown) (Temporary Prohibition on Use of Road) Order 2018 (S.S.I. 2018 No. 208)
- The A92 Trunk Road (Cowdenbeath) (Temporary Prohibition on Use of Road) Order 2018 (S.S.I. 2018 No. 209)
- The A86 Trunk Road (Laggan) (Temporary Vehicle Width Restriction) Order 2018 (S.S.I. 2018 No. 210)
- The Council Tax Reduction (Scotland) Amendment (No. 2) Regulations 2018 (S.S.I. 2018 No. 211)
- The National Health Service (General Ophthalmic Services) (Scotland) Amendment Regulations 2018 (S.S.I. 2018 No. 212)
- The Scottish Fiscal Commission (Modification of Functions) Regulations 2018 (S.S.I. 2018 No. 213)
- The ILF Scotland (Miscellaneous Listings) Order 2018 (S.S.I. 2018 No. 214)
- The Firefighters’ Pension Scheme (Scotland) Amendment Order 2018 (S.S.I. 2018 No. 215)
- The Firemen's Pension Scheme (Amendment) (Scotland) Order 2018 (S.S.I. 2018 No. 216)
- The M8 (Newhouse to Easterhouse) M73 (Maryville to Mollinsburn) M74 (Daldowie to Hamilton) A8 (Newhouse to Bargeddie) A725 (Shawhead to Whistleberry) A7071 (Bellshill) Trunk Roads (Temporary Prohibitions of Traffic and Overtaking and Temporary Speed Restrictions) (No. 3) Order 2018 (S.S.I. 2018 No. 217)
- The Regulation of Investigatory Powers (Prescription of Offices, etc. and Specification of Public Authorities) (Scotland) Amendment Order 2018 (S.S.I. 2018 No. 218)
- The Environmental Authorisations (Scotland) Regulations 2018 (S.S.I. 2018 No. 219)
- The Equality Act 2010 (Specific Duties) (Scotland) Amendment Regulations 2018 (S.S.I. 2018 No. 220)
- The Land and Buildings Transaction Tax (First-Time Buyer Relief) (Scotland) Order 2018 (S.S.I. 2018 No. 221)
- The Land and Buildings Transaction Tax (Group Relief Modification) (Scotland) Order 2018 (S.S.I. 2018 No. 222)
- The A83 Trunk Road (Barmore Road, Tarbert) (Temporary Prohibition On Use of Road) Order 2018 (S.S.I. 2018 No. 223)
- The M74/A74(M) Trunk Road (Tradeston) (Temporary Prohibition on Use of Road) Order 2018 (S.S.I. 2018 No. 224)
- The A90 Trunk Road (Aberdeen Western Peripheral Route) (Balmedie to Tipperty) (Temporary 30 mph & 40 mph Speed Restrictions) Order 2018 (S.S.I. 2018 No. 225)
- The A83 Trunk Road (Inveraray) (Temporary Prohibition On Use of Road) Order 2018 (S.S.I. 2018 No. 226)
- The A85 Trunk Road (Lochearnhead) (Temporary Prohibition on Use of Road) Order 2018 (S.S.I. 2018 No. 227)
- The A85 Trunk Road (Taynuilt) (Temporary Prohibition on Use of Road) Order 2018 (S.S.I. 2018 No. 228)
- Act of Adjournal (Criminal Procedure Rules 1996 Amendment) (Approval of Sentencing Guidelines) 2018 (S.S.I. 2018 No. 229)
- The A702 Trunk Road (Biggar) (Temporary Prohibition on Use of Road) Order 2018 (S.S.I. 2018 No. 230)
- The A9 Trunk Road (Scrabster) (Temporary Prohibition on Use of Road) (No. 3) Order 2018 (S.S.I. 2018 No. 231)
- The A85 Trunk Road (Laggan Park To Bridge Street, Comrie) (Temporary Prohibition on Use Of Road) Order 2018 (S.S.I. 2018 No. 232)
- The A725 Trunk Road (Raith) (Temporary Prohibition of Specified Classes of Traffic and Pedestrians) Order 2018 (S.S.I. 2018 No. 233)
- The South West Scotland Trunk Roads (Temporary Prohibitions of Traffic and Overtaking and Temporary Speed Restrictions) (No. 5) Order 2018 (S.S.I. 2018 No. 234)
- The North East Scotland Trunk Roads (Temporary Prohibitions of Traffic and Overtaking and Temporary Speed Restrictions) (No. 7) Order 2018 (S.S.I. 2018 No. 235)
- The South East Scotland Trunk Roads (Temporary Prohibitions of Traffic and Overtaking and Temporary Speed Restrictions) (No. 7) Order 2018 (S.S.I. 2018 No. 236)
- The North West Scotland Trunk Roads (Temporary Prohibitions of Traffic and Overtaking and Temporary Speed Restrictions) (No. 7) Order 2018 (S.S.I. 2018 No. 237)
- The A83 Trunk Road (Ardrishaig) (Temporary Prohibition on Use of Road) Order 2018 (S.S.I. 2018 No. 238)
- The M9/A9 Trunk Road (Gleneagles) (Temporary 50 mph Speed Restriction) Order 2018 (S.S.I. 2018 No. 239)
- The A90 Trunk Road (Aberdeen Western Peripheral Route) (Stonehaven to Craibstone) (Temporary 40 mph & 50 mph Speed Restrictions) Order 2018 (S.S.I. 2018 No. 240)
- The A90 Trunk Road (Aberdeen Western Peripheral Route) (Stonehaven to Charleston) (Temporary 40 mph Speed Restriction) Order 2018 (S.S.I. 2018 No. 241)
- The A956 Trunk Road (Aberdeen Western Peripheral Route) (Cleanhill to Charleston) (Temporary 40 mph Speed Restriction) Order 2018 (S.S.I. 2018 No. 242)
- The Digital Government (Scottish Bodies) Regulations 2018 (S.S.I. 2018 No. 243)
- The M8 (Baillieston to Bargeddie) M73 (Maryville to Mollinsburn) M74 (Daldowie to Hamilton) A725 (Bellziehill to Orbiston) Trunk Roads (Temporary Prohibitions of Traffic and Overtaking and Temporary Speed Restrictions) Order 2018 (S.S.I. 2018 No. 244)
- The Scalpay Island, Isle of Skye, Scallops Several Fishery Order 2018 (S.S.I. 2018 No. 245)
- The M8 Motorway (Junction 15, Townhead) (Temporary Prohibition on Use of Road) Order 2018 (S.S.I. 2018 No. 246)
- The M9/A9 Trunk Road (Stirling) (Temporary 40 mph Speed Restriction) Order 2018 (S.S.I. 2018 No. 247)
- The A85 Trunk Road (Crieff) (Temporary Prohibition on Use of Road) Order 2018 (S.S.I. 2018 No. 248)
- The A78 Trunk Road (High Street, Greenock) (Temporary Prohibition of Specified Turns) (No. 2) Order 2018 (S.S.I. 2018 No. 249)
- The Social Security (Scotland) Act 2018 (Commencement No. 1) Regulations 2018 (S.S.I. 2018 No. 250 (C. 17))
- The M9/A9 and A95 Trunk Roads (Granish to Grantown-On-Spey) (Temporary Prohibition on Use of Road and Specified Turns) Order 2018 (S.S.I. 2018 No. 251)
- The A9 Trunk Road (McDiarmid Park) (Temporary 30 mph Speed Restriction) (No. 3) Order 2018 (S.S.I. 2018 No. 252)
- The Housing (Amendment) (Scotland) Act 2018 (Commencement and Savings Provisions) Regulations 2018 (S.S.I. 2018 No. 253 (C. 18))
- The A6091 Trunk Road (Borders General Hospital Junction) (Prohibition of Specified Turns) Revocation Order 2018 (S.S.I. 2018 No. 254)
- The A77 Trunk Road (Bankfield Roundabout) (Temporary 40 mph Speed Restriction) Order 2018 (S.S.I. 2018 No. 255)
- The Licensing (Fees) (Scotland) Amendment Regulations 2018 (S.S.I. 2018 No. 256)
- The A82 Trunk Road (Onich) (Temporary Prohibition on Waiting, Loading and Unloading) Order 2018 (S.S.I. 2018 No. 257)
- The South East Scotland Trunk Roads (Temporary Prohibitions of Traffic and Overtaking and Temporary Speed Restrictions) (No. 8) Order 2018 (S.S.I. 2018 No. 258)
- The North West Scotland Trunk Roads (Temporary Prohibitions of Traffic and Overtaking and Temporary Speed Restrictions) (No. 8) Order 2018 (S.S.I. 2018 No. 259)
- The North East Scotland Trunk Roads (Temporary Prohibitions of Traffic and Overtaking and Temporary Speed Restrictions) (No. 8) Order 2018 (S.S.I. 2018 No. 260)
- The A85 Trunk Road (Crianlarich) (30 mph and Part Time 20 mph Speed Limit) Order 2018 (S.S.I. 2018 No. 261)
- The M8 (Newhouse to Easterhouse), M73 (Maryville to Mollinsburn), A8 (Newhouse to Bargeddie) and A725 (Shawhead to Whistleberry) Trunk Roads (Temporary Prohibitions of Traffic and Overtaking and Temporary Speed Restrictions) (No. 2) Order 2018 (S.S.I. 2018 No. 262)
- The A87 Trunk Road (Luib) (Temporary Prohibition on Use of Road) Order 2018 (S.S.I. 2018 No. 263)
- The A82 Trunk Road (Glencoe) (Temporary Prohibition on Use of Road) Order 2018 (S.S.I. 2018 No. 264)
- The M8/A8 Trunk Road (Baillieston to Bargeddie) (Temporary Prohibition on Use of Road) Order 2018 (S.S.I. 2018 No. 265)
- Act of Sederunt (Rules of the Court of Session 1994 Amendment) (Jury Trials) 2018 (S.S.I. 2018 No. 266)
- The Licensing Register (Scotland) Amendment Regulations 2018 (S.S.I. 2018 No. 267)
- The A9 Trunk Road (Glassingall, Dunblane) (Temporary Prohibition of Specified Turns) (No. 2) Order 2018 (S.S.I. 2018 No. 268)
- The A82 Trunk Road (Glencoe) (Temporary Prohibition on Use of Road) (No. 2) Order 2018 (S.S.I. 2018 No. 269)
- The A85 Trunk Road (Comrie) (Temporary Prohibition of Waiting, Loading and Unloading) Order 2018 (S.S.I. 2018 No. 270)
- The A87 Trunk Road (Luib) (Temporary Prohibition on Use of Road) (No. 2) Order 2018 (S.S.I. 2018 No. 271)
- The Special Restrictions on Adoptions from Ethiopia (Scotland) Order 2018 (S.S.I. 2018 No. 272)
- The First-tier Tribunal for Scotland Social Security Chamber (Procedure) Regulations 2018 (S.S.I. 2018 No. 273)
- The Upper Tribunal for Scotland (Social Security Rules of Procedure) Regulations 2018 (S.S.I. 2018 No. 274)
- The Social Security Appeals (Expenses and Allowances) (Scotland) Regulations 2018 (S.S.I. 2018 No. 275)
- The Scottish Tribunals (Eligibility for Appointment) Amendment Regulations 2018 (S.S.I. 2018 No. 276)
- The A83 Trunk Road (Campbeltown) (Temporary Prohibition on Use of Road, Waiting, Loading and Unloading) (No. 2) Order 2018 (S.S.I. 2018 No. 277)
- The Regulation of Social Housing (Influence of Local Authorities) (Scotland) Regulations 2018 (S.S.I. 2018 No. 278)
- The Road Traffic (Permitted Parking Area and Special Parking Area) (Falkirk Council) Designation Order 2018 (S.S.I. 2018 No. 279)
- The Parking Attendants (Wearing of Uniforms) (Falkirk Council Parking Area) Regulations 2018 (S.S.I. 2018 No. 280)
- The Road Traffic (Parking Adjudicators) (Falkirk Council) Regulations 2018 (revoked) (S.S.I. 2018 No. 281)
- The Islands (Scotland) Act 2018 (Commencement) Regulations 2018 (S.S.I. 2018 No. 282 (C. 19))
- The Plant Health (Scotland) Amendment (No. 2) Order 2018 (revoked) (S.S.I. 2018 No. 283)
- The Marketing of Ornamental Plant Propagating Material Amendment (Scotland) Regulations 2018 (S.S.I. 2018 No. 284)
- The A702 Trunk Road (Biggar Road, Hillend) (Temporary Prohibition on Waiting, Loading and Unloading) Order 2018 (S.S.I. 2018 No. 285)
- The South West Scotland Trunk Roads (Temporary Prohibitions of Traffic and Overtaking and Temporary Speed Restrictions) (No. 6) Order 2018 (S.S.I. 2018 No. 286)
- The South East Scotland Trunk Roads (Temporary Prohibitions of Traffic and Overtaking and Temporary Speed Restrictions) (No. 9) Order 2018 (S.S.I. 2018 No. 287)
- The North West Scotland Trunk Roads (Temporary Prohibitions of Traffic and Overtaking and Temporary Speed Restrictions) (No. 9) Order 2018 (S.S.I. 2018 No. 288)
- The North East Scotland Trunk Roads (Temporary Prohibitions of Traffic and Overtaking and Temporary Speed Restrictions) (No. 9) Order 2018 (S.S.I. 2018 No. 289)
- The M8 (Newhouse to Easterhouse) M73 (Maryville to Mollinsburn) M74 (Daldowie to Hamilton) A8 (Newhouse to Bargeddie) A725 (Shawhead to Whistleberry) A7071 (Bellshill) Trunk Roads (Temporary Prohibitions of Traffic and Overtaking and Temporary Speed Restrictions) (No. 4) Order 2018 (S.S.I. 2018 No. 290)
- The A82 Trunk Road (Drumnadrochit and Lewiston) (30 mph Speed Limit) Order 2018 (S.S.I. 2018 No. 291)
- The Private Landlord Registration (Information and Fees) (Scotland) Amendment Regulations 2018 (revoked) (S.S.I. 2018 No. 292)
- The Prisons and Young Offenders Institutions (Scotland) Amendment Rules 2018 (S.S.I. 2018 No. 293)
- The A9 Trunk Road (McDiarmid Park) (Temporary 30 mph Speed Restriction) (No. 4) Order 2018 (S.S.I. 2018 No. 294)
- The Council Tax Reduction (Scotland) Amendment (No. 3) Regulations 2018 (S.S.I. 2018 No. 295)
- The Renfrewshire Council (White Cart Water Navigation) Harbour Revision Order 2018 (S.S.I. 2018 No. 296)
- The Debt Arrangement Scheme (Scotland) Amendment Regulations 2018 (S.S.I. 2018 No. 297)
- The Social Security (Scotland) Act 2018 (Commencement No. 2, Transitory and Saving Provision) Regulations 2018 (S.S.I. 2018 No. 298 (C. 20))
- The Public Appointments and Public Bodies etc. (Scotland) Act 2003 (Amendment of Specified Authorities) Order 2018 (S.S.I. 2018 No. 299)
- The National Health Service (General Dental Services) (Miscellaneous Amendments) (Scotland) Regulations 2018 (S.S.I. 2018 No. 300)

== 301-393 ==
- The Registered Social Landlords (Repayment Charges) (Scotland) Regulations 2018 (S.S.I. 2018 No. 301)
- The A9 Trunk Road (Scrabster) (Temporary Prohibition on Use of Road) (No. 4) Order 2018 (S.S.I. 2018 No. 302)
- The A76 Trunk Road (High Street, Sanquhar) (Temporary Prohibition of Waiting, Loading and Unloading) Order 2018 (S.S.I. 2018 No. 303)
- The A86 Trunk Road (Newtonmore) (Temporary Prohibition on Waiting, Loading and Unloading) Order 2018 (S.S.I. 2018 No. 304)
- The A702 Trunk Road (Carlops) (Temporary Prohibition on Waiting, Loading and Unloading) Order 2018 (S.S.I. 2018 No. 305)
- The A82 Trunk Road (Invermoriston) (Temporary 40 mph Speed Restriction) Order 2018 (S.S.I. 2018 No. 306)
- The Education (Student Loans) (Miscellaneous Amendments) (Scotland) Regulations 2018 (S.S.I. 2018 No. 307)
- The Glasgow City Council Area and North Lanarkshire Council Area (Cardowan by Stepps) Boundaries Amendment Order 2018 (S.S.I. 2018 No. 308)
- The South West Scotland Trunk Roads (Temporary Prohibitions of Traffic and Overtaking and Temporary Speed Restrictions) (No. 7) Order 2018 (S.S.I. 2018 No. 309)
- The South East Scotland Trunk Roads (Temporary Prohibitions of Traffic and Overtaking and Temporary Speed Restrictions) (No. 10) Order 2018 (S.S.I. 2018 No. 310)
- The North West Scotland Trunk Roads (Temporary Prohibitions of Traffic and Overtaking and Temporary Speed Restrictions) (No. 10) Order 2018 (S.S.I. 2018 No. 311)
- The North East Scotland Trunk Roads (Temporary Prohibitions of Traffic and Overtaking and Temporary Speed Restrictions) (No. 10) Order 2018 (S.S.I. 2018 No. 312)
- The Public Appointments and Public Bodies etc. (Scotland) Act 2003 (Treatment of Poverty and Inequality Commission and Scottish Commission on Social Security as Specified Authorities) Order 2018 (S.S.I. 2018 No. 313)
- The M8 (Baillieston to Bargeddie), M73 (Maryville to Mollinsburn), M74 (Daldowie to Hamilton) and A725 (Bellziehill to Orbiston) Trunk Roads (Temporary Prohibitions of Traffic and Overtaking and Temporary Speed Restrictions) Order 2018 (S.S.I. 2018 No. 314)
- The A78 Trunk Road (High Street, Greenock) (Temporary Prohibition of Specified Turns) (No. 3) Order 2018 (S.S.I. 2018 No. 315)
- The Public Services Reform (Poverty and Inequality Commission) (Scotland) Order 2018 (S.S.I. 2018 No. 316)
- The A83 Trunk Road (Lochgilphead) (Temporary Prohibition On Use Of Road) Order 2018 (S.S.I. 2018 No. 317)
- The A83 Trunk Road (Campbeltown) (Temporary Prohibition On Use Of Road) Order 2018 (S.S.I. 2018 No. 318)
- The A84/A85 Trunk Road (Taynuilt) (Temporary Prohibition on Use of Road) (No. 2) Order 2018 (S.S.I. 2018 No. 319)
- The A84/A85 Trunk Road (Callander) (Temporary Prohibition On Use Of Road) Order 2018 (S.S.I. 2018 No. 320)
- The A702 Trunk Road (Biggar) (Temporary Prohibition on Use of Road) (No. 2) Order 2018 (S.S.I. 2018 No. 321)
- The A87 Trunk Road (Balmacara) (Temporary Prohibition On Use Of Road) Order 2018 (S.S.I. 2018 No. 322)
- The A84/A85 Trunk Road (Lochearnhead) (Temporary Prohibition on Use of Road) Order 2018 (S.S.I. 2018 No. 323)
- The A9 Trunk Road (Seaforth Road, Golspie) (Temporary Prohibition on Use of Road) Order 2018 (S.S.I. 2018 No. 324)
- The A68 (Cranstoun Church) (Temporary Prohibition on Use of Road) Order 2018 (S.S.I. 2018 No. 325)
- The A84/A85 Trunk Road (Doune) (Temporary Prohibition On Use Of Road) Order 2018 (S.S.I. 2018 No. 326)
- The A83 Trunk Road (Ardrishaig) (Temporary Prohibition On Use Of Road) (No. 2) Order 2018 (S.S.I. 2018 No. 327)
- The A83 Trunk Road (Inveraray) (Temporary Prohibition on Use of Road) (No. 3) Order 2018 (S.S.I. 2018 No. 328)
- The A82 and A86 Trunk Roads (Glencoe and Kinloch Laggan) (Temporary Prohibition of Traffic) Order 2018 (S.S.I. 2018 No. 329)
- The A83 Trunk Road (Poltalloch Street, Lochgilphead) (Temporary Prohibition on Waiting, Loading and Unloading) Order 2018 (S.S.I. 2018 No. 330)
- The A83 Trunk Road (Lochgilphead) (Temporary Prohibition On Use of Road) (No. 2) Order 2018 (S.S.I. 2018 No. 331)
- The A9 Trunk Road (Brora) (Temporary Prohibition on Use of Road) Order 2018 (S.S.I. 2018 No. 332)
- The Tuberculosis (Miscellaneous Amendments) (Scotland) (No. 2) Order 2018 (S.S.I. 2018 No. 333)
- The A85 Trunk Road (Crieff) (Temporary Prohibition on Use of Road) (No. 2) Order 2018 (S.S.I. 2018 No. 334)
- The A85 Trunk Road (Oban) (Temporary Prohibition on Use of Road) (No. 3) Order 2018 (S.S.I. 2018 No. 335)
- The A83 Trunk Road (Arrochar) (Temporary Prohibition on Use of Road) Order 2018 (S.S.I. 2018 No. 336)
- The A78 Trunk Road (Inverkip) (Temporary Prohibition on Use of Road) Order 2018 (S.S.I. 2018 No. 337)
- The M9/A9 Trunk Road (Thurso Remembrance Day) (Temporary Prohibition on Use of Road) Order 2018 (S.S.I. 2018 No. 338)
- The A96 Trunk Road (Church Road, Keith) (Temporary Prohibition on Use of Road) Order 2018 (S.S.I. 2018 No. 339)
- The Gender Representation on Public Boards (Scotland) Act 2018 (Commencement No. 1) Regulations 2018 (S.S.I. 2018 No. 340 (C. 21))
- The Licensed Legal Services (Complaints About Approved Regulators) (Scotland) Regulations 2018 (S.S.I. 2018 No. 341)
- The Environmental Noise (Scotland) Amendment Regulations 2018 (S.S.I. 2018 No. 342)
- The First-tier Tribunal for Scotland Social Security Chamber (Rules of Procedure) Amendment Regulations 2018 (S.S.I. 2018 No. 343)
- The Charities Accounts (Scotland) Amendment Regulations 2018 (S.S.I. 2018 No. 344)
- The Diligence against Earnings (Variation) (Scotland) Regulations 2018 (S.S.I. 2018 No. 345)
- The Revenue Scotland and Tax Powers Act 2014 (Ancillary Provision) Order 2018 (S.S.I. 2018 No. 346)
- The Insolvency (Scotland) (Receivership and Winding up) Rules 2018 (S.S.I. 2018 No. 347)
- Act of Sederunt (Rules of the Court of Session 1994 Amendment) (Protective Expenses Orders) 2018 (S.S.I. 2018 No. 348)
- The First-tier Tribunal for Scotland (Chambers) Amendment Regulations 2018 (S.S.I. 2018 No. 349)
- The First-tier Tribunal for Scotland (Allocation of Functions to the Social Security Chamber) Regulations 2018 (S.S.I. 2018 No. 350)
- The First-tier Tribunal for Scotland Social Security Chamber and Upper Tribunal for Scotland (Composition) Regulations 2018 (S.S.I. 2018 No. 351)
- The Renewables Obligation (Scotland) Amendment Order 2018 (S.S.I. 2018 No. 352)
- The A82 Trunk Road (Fort William) (Temporary Prohibition on Use Of Road) Order 2018 (S.S.I. 2018 No. 353)
- The Assigned Colleges (University of the Highlands and Islands) Order 2018 (S.S.I. 2018 No. 354)
- The A84 Trunk Road (Main Street, Callander) (Temporary Prohibition on Use of Road) Order 2018 (S.S.I. 2018 No. 355)
- The A77 Trunk Road (Girvan) (Temporary Prohibition on Use of Road) Order 2018 (S.S.I. 2018 No. 356)
- The Social Security (Scotland) Act 2018 (Commencement No. 3) Regulations 2018 (S.S.I. 2018 No. 357 (C. 22))
- The A83 Trunk Road (Main Street, Inveraray) (Temporary Prohibition on Use of Road) Order 2018 (S.S.I. 2018 No. 358)
- The North East Scotland Trunk Roads (Temporary Prohibitions of Traffic and Overtaking and Temporary Speed Restrictions) (No. 11) Order 2018 (S.S.I. 2018 No. 359)
- The North West Scotland Trunk Roads (Temporary Prohibitions of Traffic and Overtaking and Temporary Speed Restrictions) (No. 11) Order 2018 (S.S.I. 2018 No. 360)
- The South East Scotland Trunk Roads (Temporary Prohibitions of Traffic and Overtaking and Temporary Speed Restrictions) (No. 11) Order 2018 (S.S.I. 2018 No. 361)
- The M8 (Newhouse to Easterhouse), M73 (Maryville to Mollinsburn), A8 (Newhouse to Bargeddie) and A725 (Shawhead to Whistleberry) Trunk Roads (Temporary Prohibitions of Traffic and Overtaking and Temporary Speed Restrictions) (No. 3) Order 2018 (S.S.I. 2018 No. 362)
- The Budget (Scotland) Act 2018 Amendment Regulations 2018 (S.S.I. 2018 No. 363)
- The A92 Trunk Road (Aberdeen Western Peripheral Route) (Stonehaven to Charleston) (Temporary Prohibition and 40 mph Speed Restriction) Order 2018 (S.S.I. 2018 No. 364)
- The A956 Trunk Road (Aberdeen Western Peripheral Route) (Cleanhill to Charleston) (Temporary Prohibitions and Restrictions) Order 2018 (S.S.I. 2018 No. 365)
- The A90 Trunk Road (Aberdeen Western Peripheral Route) (Temporary Prohibitions and Restrictions) Order 2018 (S.S.I. 2018 No. 366)
- The Clydeport Operations Limited (Greenock Ocean Terminal Cruise Berth) Harbour Revision Order 2018 (S.S.I. 2018 No. 367)
- The Civil Litigation (Expenses and Group Proceedings) (Scotland) Act 2018 (Commencement No. 1, Transitional and Saving Provisions) Regulations 2018 (S.S.I. 2018 No. 368 (C. 23))
- Act of Sederunt (Child Support Rules Amendment) (Disqualification) 2018 (S.S.I. 2018 No. 369)
- The Early Years Assistance (Best Start Grants) (Scotland) Regulations 2018 (S.S.I. 2018 No. 370)
- The A82 Trunk Road (Tyndrum) (40 mph Temporary Speed Restriction) Order 2018 (S.S.I. 2018 No. 371)
- The Land and Buildings Transaction Tax (Tax Rates and Tax Bands etc.) (Scotland) Amendment Order 2018 (S.S.I. 2018 No. 372)
- The Multilingual Standard Forms (Fees) (Scotland) Regulations 2018 (revoked) (S.S.I. 2018 No. 373)
- The Multilingual Standard Forms (Consequential Amendments) (Scotland) Regulations 2018 (S.S.I. 2018 No. 374)
- The A83 Trunk Road (Campbeltown) (Temporary Prohibition on Use of Road, Waiting, Loading and Unloading) (No. 3) Order 2018 (S.S.I. 2018 No. 375)
- The Redemption of Heritable Securities (Excluded Securities) (Scotland) Order 2018 (S.S.I. 2018 No. 376)
- The A76 Trunk Road (Enterkinfoot to Thornhill) (Trunking) Order 2018 (S.S.I. 2018 No. 377)
- The First-tier Tribunal for Scotland Housing and Property Chamber (Procedure) Amendment Regulations 2018 (S.S.I. 2018 No. 378)
- The A90 Trunk Road (Aberdeen Western Peripheral Route) (Temporary Prohibitions and Restrictions) (No. 2) Order 2018 (S.S.I. 2018 No. 379)
- The Burial and Cremation (Scotland) Act 2016 (Commencement No. 3, Transitional, Saving and Transitory Provisions) Regulations 2018 (S.S.I. 2018 No. 380 (C. 24))
- The South West Scotland Trunk Roads (Temporary Prohibitions of Traffic and Overtaking and Temporary Speed Restrictions) (No. 8) Order 2018 (S.S.I. 2018 No. 381)
- The North East Scotland Trunk Roads (Temporary Prohibitions of Traffic and Overtaking and Temporary Speed Restrictions) (No. 12) Order 2018 (S.S.I. 2018 No. 382)
- The South East Scotland Trunk Roads (Temporary Prohibitions of Traffic and Overtaking and Temporary Speed Restrictions) (No. 12) Order 2018 (S.S.I. 2018 No. 383)
- The Burial and Cremation (Pregnancy Loss Prescribed Information and Forms) (Scotland) Regulations 2018 (S.S.I. 2018 No. 384)
- The A85 Trunk Road (Comrie) (Temporary Prohibition on Use Of Road) (No. 3) Order 2018 (S.S.I. 2018 No. 385)
- The North West Scotland Trunk Roads (Temporary Prohibitions of Traffic and Overtaking and Temporary Speed Restrictions) (No. 12) Order 2018 (S.S.I. 2018 No. 386)
- The Domestic Abuse (Scotland) Act 2018 (Commencement and Transitional Provision) Regulations 2018 (S.S.I. 2018 No. 387 (C. 25))
- The A702 Trunk Road (Biggar) (Temporary Prohibition on Use of Road) (No. 3) Order 2018 (S.S.I. 2018 No. 388)
- The Spring Traps Approval (Scotland) Amendment Order 2018 (S.S.I. 2018 No. 389)
- The M8 (Newhouse to Easterhouse) M73 (Maryville to Mollinsburn) M74 (Daldowie to Hamilton) A8 (Newhouse to Bargeddie) A725 (Shawhead to Whistleberry) A7071 (Bellshill) Trunk Roads (Temporary Prohibitions of Traffic and Overtaking and Temporary Speed Restrictions) (No. 5) Order 2018 (S.S.I. 2018 No. 390)
- The Environment, Food and Rural Affairs (Miscellaneous Amendments and Revocations) (Scotland) Regulations 2018 (S.S.I. 2018 No. 391)
- The Foods for Specific Groups (Medical Foods) (Miscellaneous Amendments) (Scotland) Regulations 2018 (S.S.I. 2018 No. 392)
- The Social Security (Scotland) Act 2018 (Commencement No. 4 and Saving Provision) Regulations 2018 (S.S.I. 2018 No. 393 (C. 26))
