= List of Scottish statutory instruments, 2022 =

This is a complete list of Scottish statutory instruments in 2022.

== 1-100 ==
- The A85 Trunk Road (Oban) (Temporary Prohibition on Waiting, Loading and Unloading) Order 2022 (S.S.I. 2022 No. 1)
- The Health Protection (Coronavirus) (International Travel and Operator Liability) (Scotland) Amendment Regulations 2022 (revoked) (S.S.I. 2022 No. 2)
- The A84/A85 Trunk Road (Callander) (Temporary Prohibition on Waiting, Loading and Unloading) Order 2022 (S.S.I. 2022 No. 3)
- The Workplace Parking Licensing (Scotland) Regulations 2022 (S.S.I. 2022 No. 4)
- The Sea Fish (Prohibition on Fishing) (Firth of Clyde) Order 2022 (revoked) (S.S.I. 2022 No. 5)
- The Health Protection (Coronavirus) (Requirements) (Scotland) Amendment Regulations 2022 (S.S.I. 2022 No. 6)
- The M73 Trunk Road (Maryville to Mollinsburn) (Temporary 50 mph Speed Restriction) Order 2022 (S.S.I. 2022 No. 7)
- The Financial Assistance for Environmental Purposes (Scotland) Order 2022 (S.S.I. 2022 No. 8)
- The Scottish Road Works Register (Prescribed Fees) Regulations 2022 (S.S.I. 2022 No. 9)
- The Parole Board (Scotland) Amendment Rules 2022 (S.S.I. 2022 No. 10)
- The Coronavirus (Scotland) Act 2020 (Early Expiry of Provisions) Regulations 2022 (S.S.I. 2022 No. 11)
- The A77 Trunk Road (Girvan) (Temporary Prohibition on Waiting, Loading and Unloading) Order 2022 (S.S.I. 2022 No. 12)
- The Health Protection (Coronavirus) (Requirements) (Scotland) Amendment (No. 2) Regulations 2022 (S.S.I. 2022 No. 13)
- The South East Scotland Trunk Roads (Temporary Prohibitions of Traffic and Overtaking and Temporary Speed Restrictions) (No. 1) Order 2022 (S.S.I. 2022 No. 14)
- The North West Scotland Trunk Roads (Temporary Prohibitions of Traffic and Overtaking and Temporary Speed Restrictions) (No. 1) Order 2022 (S.S.I. 2022 No. 15)
- The North East Scotland Trunk Roads (Temporary Prohibitions of Traffic and Overtaking and Temporary Speed Restrictions) (No. 1) Order 2022 (S.S.I. 2022 No. 16)
- The South West Scotland Trunk Roads (Temporary Prohibitions of Traffic and Overtaking and Temporary Speed Restrictions) (No. 1) Order 2022 (S.S.I. 2022 No. 17)
- The Local Governance (Scotland) Act 2004 (Remuneration) Amendment Regulations 2022 (S.S.I. 2022 No. 18)
- The A7 Trunk Road (Hawick) (Temporary Prohibition on Waiting, Loading and Unloading) Order 2022 (S.S.I. 2022 No. 19)
- The M9/A9 Trunk Road (Denmarkfield Farm, Luncarty) (Temporary Prohibition of Specified Turns) Order 2022 (S.S.I. 2022 No. 20)
- The M77/A77 Trunk Road (Maybole Bypass) (Temporary 30 mph and 40 mph Speed Restrictions) Order 2022 (S.S.I. 2022 No. 21)
- The Victims and Witnesses (Scotland) Act 2014 (Commencement No. 9) Order 2022 (S.S.I. 2022 No. 22 (C. 1))
- The Non-Domestic Rates (Scotland) Act 2020 (Commencement No. 2, Transitional and Saving Provisions (Amendment) and Commencement No. 3 and Saving Provision) Regulations 2022 (S.S.I. 2022 No. 23 (C. 2))
- The Forensic Medical Services (Victims of Sexual Offences) (Scotland) Act 2021 Commencement Regulations 2022 (S.S.I. 2022 No. 24 (C. 3))
- The Health Protection (Coronavirus) (International Travel and Operator Liability) (Scotland) Amendment (No. 2) Regulations 2022 (revoked) (S.S.I. 2022 No. 25)
- The M8/M73/M74 Motorways (30 mph, 40 mph and 50 mph Speed Limit) Regulations 2022 (S.S.I. 2022 No. 26)
- The M8 (Newhouse to Easterhouse) M73 (Maryville to Mollinsburn) M74 (Daldowie to Hamilton) A725 (Shawhead to Whistleberry) Trunk Roads (Temporary Prohibitions of Traffic and Overtaking and Temporary Speed Restrictions) Order 2022 (S.S.I. 2022 No. 27)
- The Carer's Allowance Up-rating (Miscellaneous Amendment) (Scotland) Regulations 2022 (S.S.I. 2022 No. 28)
- The Health Protection (Coronavirus) (Requirements) (Scotland) Amendment (No. 3) Regulations 2022 (S.S.I. 2022 No. 29)
- The Legal Aid and Advice and Assistance (Miscellaneous Amendment) (Scotland) Regulations 2022 (S.S.I. 2022 No. 30)
- The Disability Assistance for Working Age People (Consequential and Miscellaneous Amendment and Transitional Provision) (Scotland) Regulations 2022 (S.S.I. 2022 No. 31)
- The Civic Government (Scotland) Act 1982 (Licensing of Short-term Lets) Order 2022 (S.S.I. 2022 No. 32)
- The Town and Country Planning (Short-term Let Control Areas) (Scotland) Amendment Regulations 2022 (S.S.I. 2022 No. 33)
- The Police Act 1997 and the Protection of Vulnerable Groups (Scotland) Act 2007 (Fees) (Coronavirus) Amendment Regulations 2022 (S.S.I. 2022 No. 34)
- The Sea Fish (Prohibition on Fishing) (Firth of Clyde) (No. 2) Order 2022 (S.S.I. 2022 No. 35)
- The Non-Domestic Rate (Scotland) Order 2022 (S.S.I. 2022 No. 36)
- The Non-Domestic Rating (Valuation of Utilities) (Scotland) Amendment Order 2022 (S.S.I. 2022 No. 37)
- The Scottish Local Government Elections Amendment Order 2022 (S.S.I. 2022 No. 38)
- The Red Rocks and Longay Urgent Marine Conservation (No. 2) Order 2021 (Urgent Continuation) Order 2022 (S.S.I. 2022 No. 39)
- The Coronavirus Act 2020 (Alteration of Expiry Date) (Scotland) Regulations 2022 (S.S.I. 2022 No. 40)
- The

Scottish Child Payment Regulations 2020 and the Disability Assistance for Children and Young People (Scotland) Regulations 2021 (Miscellaneous Amendments) Regulations 2022 (S.S.I. 2022 No. 41)

- The Social Security (Industrial Injuries) (Prescribed Diseases) Amendment (Scotland) Regulations 2022 (S.S.I. 2022 No. 42)
- The Health (Tobacco, Nicotine etc. and Care) (Scotland) Act 2016 (Commencement No. 5) Regulations 2022 (S.S.I. 2022 No. 43 (C. 4))
- The Redress for Survivors (Historical Child Abuse in Care) (Reconsideration and Review of Determinations) (Scotland) Regulations 2022 (S.S.I. 2022 No. 44)
- The Personal Injuries (NHS Charges) (Amounts) (Scotland) Amendment Regulations 2022 (S.S.I. 2022 No. 45)
- The Scottish Landfill Tax (Standard Rate and Lower Rate) Order 2022 (S.S.I. 2022 No. 46)
- The Non-Domestic Rates (Coronavirus Reliefs) (Scotland) Regulations 2022 (S.S.I. 2022 No. 47)
- The Non-Domestic Rates (Levying and Miscellaneous Amendment) (Scotland) Regulations 2022 (S.S.I. 2022 No. 48)
- The Non-Domestic Rates (Relief for New and Improved Properties) (Scotland) Regulations 2022

(S.S.I. 2022 No. 49)

- The Town and Country Planning (Fees for Applications) (Scotland) Regulations 2022 (S.S.I. 2022 No. 50)
- The Non-Domestic Rating (Unoccupied Property) (Scotland) Amendment Regulations 2022 (S.S.I. 2022 No. 51)
- The Council Tax Reduction (Scotland) Amendment Regulations 2022 (S.S.I. 2022 No. 52)
- The Health Protection (Coronavirus) (International Travel and Operator Liability) (Scotland) Amendment (No. 3) Regulations 2022 (revoked) (S.S.I. 2022 No. 53)
- The Disability Assistance for Working Age People (Scotland) Regulations 2022 (S.S.I. 2022 No. 54)
- The A96 Trunk Road (Keith) (Temporary Prohibition on Waiting, Loading and Unloading) Order 2022 (S.S.I. 2022 No. 55)
- The Social Security Information-sharing (Scotland) Amendment Regulations 2022 (S.S.I. 2022 No. 56)
- The A702 Trunk Road (Mauricewood Roundabout to the Glencorse Junction) (Temporary Clearway) Order 2022 (S.S.I. 2022 No. 57)
- The A9 and A96 Trunk Roads (Raigmore Interchange) (30 mph and 50 mph Speed Limit) Order 2022 (S.S.I. 2022 No. 58)
- The A83 Trunk Road (Campbeltown) (Temporary Prohibition on Waiting, Loading and Unloading) Order 2022 (S.S.I. 2022 No. 59)
- The North East Scotland Trunk Roads (Temporary Prohibitions of Traffic and Overtaking and Temporary Speed Restrictions) (No. 2) Order 2022 (S.S.I. 2022 No. 60)
- The North West Scotland Trunk Roads (Temporary Prohibitions of Traffic and Overtaking and Temporary Speed Restrictions) (No. 2) Order 2022 (S.S.I. 2022 No. 61)
- The South East Scotland Trunk Roads (Temporary Prohibitions of Traffic and Overtaking and Temporary Speed Restrictions) (No. 2) Order 2022 (S.S.I. 2022 No. 62)
- The South West Scotland Trunk Roads (Temporary Prohibitions of Traffic and Overtaking and Temporary Speed Restrictions) (No. 2) Order 2022 (S.S.I. 2022 No. 63)
- The Coronavirus (Scotland) Acts (Early Expiry of Provisions) Regulations 2022 (S.S.I. 2022 No. 64)
- The Registers of Scotland (Digital Registration, etc.) Regulations 2022 (S.S.I. 2022 No. 65)
- The Town and Country Planning (Miscellaneous Temporary Modifications) (Coronavirus) (Scotland) Regulations 2022 (S.S.I. 2022 No. 66)
- The Planning (Scotland) Act 2019 (Commencement No. 6 and Transitional Provision) Amendment Regulations 2022 (S.S.I. 2022 No. 67 (C. 5))
- The Registration Services (Fees, etc.) (Scotland) Amendment Regulations 2022 (S.S.I. 2022 No. 68)
- The M8 (Newhouse to Easterhouse) M73 (Maryville to Mollinsburn) A8 (Newhouse to Bargeddie) A725 (Shawhead to Whistleberry) Trunk Roads (Temporary Prohibitions of Traffic and Overtaking and Temporary Speed Restrictions) Order 2022 (S.S.I. 2022 No. 69)
- The National Assistance (Sums for Personal Requirements) (Scotland) Regulations 2022 (S.S.I. 2022 No. 70)
- The National Assistance (Assessment of Resources) Amendment (Scotland) Regulations 2022 (S.S.I. 2022 No. 71)
- The National Assistance (Assessment of Resources) Amendment (Scotland) (No. 2) Regulations 2022 (S.S.I. 2022 No. 72)
- The Prisons and Young Offenders Institutions (Coronavirus) (Scotland) Amendment Rules 2022 (S.S.I. 2022 No. 73)
- The Health Protection (Coronavirus) (Requirements) (Scotland) Amendment (No. 5) Regulations 2022 (S.S.I. 2022 No. 74)
- The A76 Trunk Road (Main Street, Kirkconnel) (Temporary Prohibition on Waiting, Loading and Unloading) Order 2022 (S.S.I. 2022 No. 75)
- The Deposit and Return Scheme for Scotland Amendment Regulations 2022 (S.S.I. 2022 No. 76)
- The Health Protection (Coronavirus) (Requirements) (Scotland) Amendment (No. 4) Regulations 2022 (S.S.I. 2022 No. 77)
- The Prescription (Scotland) Act 2018 (Commencement, Saving and Transitional Provisions) Regulations 2022 (S.S.I. 2022 No. 78 (C. 6))
- The Firemen's Pension Scheme (Amendment) (Scotland) Order 2022 (S.S.I. 2022 No. 79)
- The Police Pensions (Commutation) Amendment (Scotland) Regulations 2022 (S.S.I. 2022 No. 80)
- Act of Sederunt (Simple Procedure Amendment) (Civil Online) 2022 (S.S.I. 2022 No. 81)
- The Coronavirus Act 2020 (Transitional Provision) (Scotland) Regulations 2022 (S.S.I. 2022 No. 82)
- The Community Care (Personal Care and Nursing Care) (Scotland) Amendment Regulations 2022 (S.S.I. 2022 No. 83)
- The Local Government Finance (Scotland) Order 2022 (S.S.I. 2022 No. 84)
- The Aquaculture and Fisheries etc. (Scheme for Financial Assistance) (Scotland) Regulations 2022 (S.S.I. 2022 No. 85)
- The Sports Grounds and Sporting Events (Designation) (Scotland) Amendment Order 2022 (S.S.I. 2022 No. 86)
- The Climate Change (Nitrogen Balance Sheet) (Scotland) Regulations 2022 (S.S.I. 2022 No. 87)
- The Forensic Medical Services (Modification of Functions of Healthcare Improvement Scotland and Supplementary Provision) Regulations 2022 (S.S.I. 2022 No. 88)
- The Forensic Medical Services (Self-Referral Evidence Retention Period) (Scotland) Regulations 2022 (S.S.I. 2022 No. 89)
- The Official Controls (Transitional Staging Period) (Miscellaneous Amendments) (Scotland) Regulations 2022 (S.S.I. 2022 No. 90)
- The Digital Government (Scottish Bodies) Regulations 2022 (S.S.I. 2022 No. 91)
- The Health Protection (Coronavirus) (Requirements) (Scotland) Revocation Regulations 2022 (S.S.I. 2022 No. 92)
- The Electronic Monitoring (Relevant Disposals) (Modification) (Scotland) Regulations 2022 (S.S.I. 2022 No. 93)
- The Management of Offenders (Scotland) Act 2019 (Commencement No. 6 and Saving Provisions) Regulations 2022 (S.S.I. 2022 No. 94 (C. 7))
- The Crime (International Co-operation) Act 2003 (Freezing Order) (EU Exit) (Scotland) Regulations 2022 (S.S.I. 2022 No. 95)
- The Maximum Number of Judges (Scotland) Order 2022 (S.S.I. 2022 No. 96)
- The Police Act 1997 (Criminal Records) (Scotland) Amendment Regulations 2022 (S.S.I. 2022 No. 97)
- The A92 Trunk Road (Halbeath to Crossgates) (40 mph and 50 mph Speed Limits) Order 2022 (S.S.I. 2022 No. 98)
- The Health Protection (Coronavirus) (International Travel and Operator Liability) (Scotland) Revocation Regulations 2022 (S.S.I. 2022 No. 99)
- The National Health Service Pension Schemes (Scotland) Amendment Regulations 2022 (S.S.I. 2022 No. 100)

== 101-200 ==
- The Police Pensions (Scotland) Amendment Regulations 2022 (S.S.I. 2022 No. 101)
- The Teachers’ Pension Scheme (Scotland) Amendment Regulations 2022 (S.S.I. 2022 No. 102)
- The Firefighters’ Pension Scheme (Scotland) Amendment Regulations 2022 (S.S.I. 2022 No. 103)
- The North West Scotland Trunk Roads (Temporary Prohibitions of Traffic and Overtaking and Temporary Speed Restrictions) (No. 3) Order 2022 (S.S.I. 2022 No. 104)
- The South East Scotland Trunk Roads (Temporary Prohibitions of Traffic and Overtaking and Temporary Speed Restrictions) (No. 3) Order 2022 (S.S.I. 2022 No. 105)
- The North East Scotland Trunk Roads (Temporary Prohibitions of Traffic and Overtaking and Temporary Speed Restrictions) (No. 3) Order 2022 (S.S.I. 2022 No. 106)
- The Rural Support (Controls) (Coronavirus) (Scotland) Regulations 2022 (S.S.I. 2022 No. 107)
- The Social Security (Residence Requirements) (Ukraine) (Scotland) Regulations 2022 (S.S.I. 2022 No. 108)
- The Health Protection (Coronavirus, Restrictions) (Directions by Local Authorities) (Scotland) Amendment Regulations 2022 (S.S.I. 2022 No. 109)
- The Rehabilitation of Offenders Act 1974 (Exclusions and Exceptions) (Scotland) Amendment Order 2022 (S.S.I. 2022 No. 110)
- The Traffic Signs Amendment (Scotland) Regulations and General Directions 2022 (S.S.I. 2022 No. 111)
- The M8 (Newhouse to Easterhouse) M73 (Maryville to Mollinsburn) M74 (Daldowie to Hamilton) A8 (Newhouse to Bargeddie) A725 (Shawhead to Whistleberry) A7071 (Bellshill) Trunk Roads (Temporary Prohibitions of Traffic and Overtaking and Temporary Speed Restrictions) Order 2022 (S.S.I. 2022 No. 112)
- The Coronavirus (Scotland) Acts (Amendment of Expiry Dates) Regulations 2022 (S.S.I. 2022 No. 113)
- The National Health Service (Charges to Overseas Visitors) (Scotland) Amendment Regulations 2022 (S.S.I. 2022 No. 114)
- The National Bus Travel Concession Schemes (Miscellaneous Amendments) (Scotland) Order 2022 (S.S.I. 2022 No. 115)
- The Legal Aid and Advice and Assistance (Financial Limit) (Scotland) Amendment Regulations 2022 (S.S.I. 2022 No. 116)
- The National Health Service Superannuation and Pension Schemes (Miscellaneous Amendments) (Scotland) Regulations 2022 (S.S.I. 2022 No. 117)
- The Provision of Early Learning and Childcare (Specified Children) (Scotland) Amendment Order 2022 (S.S.I. 2022 No. 118)
- The Scottish Fire and Rescue Service (Framework) Order 2022 (S.S.I. 2022 No. 119)
- Act of Adjournal (Criminal Procedure Rules 1996 Amendment) (Electronic Monitoring) 2022 (S.S.I. 2022 No. 120)
- The Budget (Scotland) Act 2021 Amendment Regulations 2022 (S.S.I. 2022 No. 121)
- The Local Authority (Capital Finance and Accounting) (Scotland) (Coronavirus) Amendment Regulations 2022 (S.S.I. 2022 No. 122)
- The Health Protection (Coronavirus) (Requirements) (Scotland) Amendment (No. 6) Regulations 2022 (S.S.I. 2022 No. 123)
- The Council Tax (Exempt Dwellings) (Scotland) Amendment Order 2022 (S.S.I. 2022 No. 124)
- The Council Tax Reduction and Council Tax (Discounts) (Miscellaneous Amendment) (Scotland) Regulations 2022 (S.S.I. 2022 No. 125)
- The Non-Domestic Rates (Valuation Roll) (Modification) (Scotland) Regulations 2022 (S.S.I. 2022 No. 126)
- The Extradition Act 2003 (Part 2 Territories) (Designation of Prosecutors) (Scotland) Order 2022 (S.S.I. 2022 No. 127)
- The Social Security Up-rating (Scotland) Order 2022 (S.S.I. 2022 No. 128)
- The Social Security (Up-rating) (Miscellaneous Amendment) (Scotland) Regulations 2022 (S.S.I. 2022 No. 129)
- The National Health Service (General Medical Services Contracts and Primary Medical Services Section 17C Agreements) (Scotland) Amendment Regulations 2022 (S.S.I. 2022 No. 130)
- The Non-Commercial Movement of Pet Animals (Scotland) Amendment Regulations 2022 (S.S.I. 2022 No. 131)
- The A83 Trunk Road (Arrochar) (Temporary Prohibition on Waiting, Loading and Unloading) Order 2022 (S.S.I. 2022 No. 132)
- The Health Protection (Coronavirus) (Requirements) (Scotland) Revocation (No. 2) Regulations 2022 (S.S.I. 2022 No. 133)
- The A82 Trunk Road (Crianlarich) (Temporary 30 mph Speed Restriction) Order 2022 (S.S.I. 2022 No. 134)
- Act of Sederunt (Rules of the Court of Session 1994 and Sheriff Appeal Court Rules Amendment) (Miscellaneous) 2022 (S.S.I. 2022 No. 135)
- The Building (Scotland) Amendment Regulations 2022 (S.S.I. 2022 No. 136)
- The Genetically Modified Food and Feed (Authorisations) (Scotland) Regulations 2022 (S.S.I. 2022 No. 137)
- The Environment and Trade in Animals and Related Products (EU Exit) (Scotland) (Miscellaneous Amendment) Regulations 2022 (S.S.I. 2022 No. 138)
- The Valuation Timetable (Scotland) Amendment Order 2022 (S.S.I. 2022 No. 139)
- The A82 Trunk Road (Fort William) (Temporary Prohibition on Use of Road) Order 2022 (S.S.I. 2022 No. 140)
- The A83 Trunk Road (Campbeltown) (Temporary Prohibition on Waiting, Loading and Unloading) (No. 2) Order 2022 (S.S.I. 2022 No. 141)
- The South West Scotland Trunk Roads (Temporary Prohibitions of Traffic and Overtaking and Temporary Speed Restrictions) (No. 3) Order 2022 (S.S.I. 2022 No. 142)
- The North East Scotland Trunk Roads (Temporary Prohibitions of Traffic and Overtaking and Temporary Speed Restrictions) (No. 4) Order 2022 (S.S.I. 2022 No. 143)
- The North West Scotland Trunk Roads (Temporary Prohibitions of Traffic and Overtaking and Temporary Speed Restrictions) (No. 4) Order 2022 (S.S.I. 2022 No. 144)
- The South East Scotland Trunk Roads (Temporary Prohibitions of Traffic and Overtaking and Temporary Speed Restrictions) (No. 4) Order 2022 (S.S.I. 2022 No. 145)
- The Social Security Administration and Tribunal Membership (Scotland) Act 2020 (Commencement No. 6) Regulations 2022 (S.S.I. 2022 No. 146 (C. 8))
- The M8 (Newhouse to Easterhouse) M73 (Maryville to Mollinsburn) M74 (Daldowie to Hamilton) A725 (Shawhead to Whistleberry) Trunk Roads (Temporary Prohibitions of Traffic and Overtaking and Temporary Speed Restrictions) (No. 2) Order 2022 (S.S.I. 2022 No. 147)
- The Offensive Weapons Act 2019 (Prescribed Documents) (Scotland) Order 2022 (S.S.I. 2022 No. 148)
- The A87 Trunk Road (Uig) (Temporary Prohibitions of Use of Road, Overtaking, Waiting, Loading and Unloading and Temporary Speed Restrictions) Order 2022 (S.S.I. 2022 No. 149)
- The Offensive Weapons Act 2019 (Commencement No. 2) (Scotland) Regulations 2022 (S.S.I. 2022 No. 150 (C. 9))
- The Equality Act 2010 (Specific Duties) (Scotland) Amendment Regulations 2022 (S.S.I. 2022 No. 151)
- The Prohibition of Smoking Outside Hospital Buildings (Scotland) Regulations 2022 (S.S.I. 2022 No. 152)
- The Local Government Pension Scheme (Scotland) (Miscellaneous Amendments) Regulations 2022 (S.S.I. 2022 No. 153)
- The Defamation and Malicious Publication (Scotland) Act 2021 (Commencement and Transitional Provision) Regulations 2022 (S.S.I. 2022 No. 154 (C. 10))
- The A68 Trunk Road (Edinburgh Road, Jedburgh) (Temporary Prohibition of Waiting and Temporary 30 mph Speed Restriction) Order 2022 (S.S.I. 2022 No. 155)
- The Education (Fees) (Scotland) Regulations 2022 (S.S.I. 2022 No. 156)
- The Student Support (Scotland) Regulations 2022 (S.S.I. 2022 No. 157)
- The Police Act 1997 (Criminal Records) (Homes for Ukraine Sponsorship Scheme) (Scotland) Amendment Regulations 2022 (S.S.I. 2022 No. 158)
- The A85 Trunk Road (Comrie) (Temporary Prohibition on Use of Road) Order 2022 (S.S.I. 2022 No. 159)
- The A92 and A96 Trunk Roads (Haudagain Improvement) (Temporary Prohibition of Waiting and Specified Turns and Temporary 20 mph, 30 mph and 40 mph Speed Restrictions) Order 2022 (S.S.I. 2022 No. 160)
- The Council Tax Reduction (Scotland) Amendment (No. 3) Regulations 2022 (S.S.I. 2022 No. 161)
- The First-tier Tribunal for Scotland Social Security Chamber and Upper Tribunal for Scotland (Rules of Procedure) (Miscellaneous Amendment) Regulations 2022 (S.S.I. 2022 No. 162)
- The Private Landlord Registration (Modification) (Scotland) Order 2022 (S.S.I. 2022 No. 163)
- The Rehabilitation of Offenders Act 1974 (Exclusions and Exceptions) (Homes for Ukraine Sponsorship Scheme) (Scotland) Amendment Order 2022 (S.S.I. 2022 No. 164)
- The A84/A85 Trunk Road (Callander) (Temporary Prohibition on Waiting, Loading and Unloading) (No. 2) Order 2022 (S.S.I. 2022 No. 165)
- The Food and Feed Safety (Fukushima Restrictions) (Scotland) Revocation Regulations 2022 (S.S.I. 2022 No. 166)
- The Welfare Foods (Best Start Foods) (Scotland) Amendment Regulations 2022 (S.S.I. 2022 No. 167)
- The Novel Foods (Authorisations) and Smoke Flavourings (Modification of Authorisations) (Scotland) Regulations 2022 (S.S.I. 2022 No. 168)
- The National Health Service (Optical Charges and Payments and General Ophthalmic Services) (Scotland) Amendment Regulations 2022 (S.S.I. 2022 No. 169)
- The National Health Service (Vocational Training for Dentists) (Miscellaneous Amendment) (Scotland) Regulations 2022 (S.S.I. 2022 No. 170)
- The Local Heat and Energy Efficiency Strategies (Scotland) Order 2022 (S.S.I. 2022 No. 171)
- The Education (Scotland) Act 1980 (Modification) Regulations 2022 (S.S.I. 2022 No. 172)
- The St Mary's Music School (Aided Places) (Scotland) Amendment Regulations 2022 (S.S.I. 2022 No. 173)
- The A85 Trunk Road (Oban) (Temporary Prohibition on Use of Road) Order 2022 (S.S.I. 2022 No. 174)
- The North East Scotland Trunk Roads (Temporary Prohibitions of Traffic and Overtaking and Temporary Speed Restrictions) (No. 5) Order 2022 (S.S.I. 2022 No. 175)
- The South East Scotland Trunk Roads (Temporary Prohibitions of Traffic and Overtaking and Temporary Speed Restrictions) (No. 5) Order 2022 (S.S.I. 2022 No. 176)
- The South West Scotland Trunk Roads (Temporary Prohibitions of Traffic and Overtaking and Temporary Speed Restrictions) (No. 4) Order 2022 (S.S.I. 2022 No. 177)
- The North West Scotland Trunk Roads (Temporary Prohibitions of Traffic and Overtaking and Temporary Speed Restrictions) (No. 5) Order 2022 (S.S.I. 2022 No. 178)
- The Justice of the Peace Court Fees (Scotland) Order 2022 (S.S.I. 2022 No. 179)
- The A9 Trunk Road (Glassingall, Dunblane) (Temporary Prohibition of Specified Turns) Order 2022 (S.S.I. 2022 No. 180)
- The Sheriff Court Fees Order 2022 (S.S.I. 2022 No. 181)
- The High Court of Justiciary Fees Order 2022 (S.S.I. 2022 No. 182)
- The Sheriff Appeal Court Fees Order 2022 (S.S.I. 2022 No. 183)
- The Adults with Incapacity (Public Guardian's Fees) (Scotland) Regulations 2022 (S.S.I. 2022 No. 184)
- The Court of Session etc. Fees Order 2022 (S.S.I. 2022 No. 185)
- The Seed (Fees) (Scotland) Amendment Regulations 2022 (S.S.I. 2022 No. 186)
- The A85 Trunk Road (Comrie) (Temporary Prohibition on Use of Road) (No. 2) Order 2022 (S.S.I. 2022 No. 187)
- The M8 (Newhouse to Easterhouse) M73 (Maryville to Mollinsburn) A8 (Newhouse to Bargeddie) A725 (Shawhead to Whistleberry) Trunk Roads (Temporary Prohibitions of Traffic and Overtaking and Temporary Speed Restrictions) (No. 2) Order 2022 (S.S.I. 2022 No. 188)
- The A830 Trunk Road (Glenfinnan) (Temporary Clearway) Order 2022 (S.S.I. 2022 No. 189)
- The Town and Country Planning (Fees for Applications) (Scotland) Amendment Regulations 2022 (S.S.I. 2022 No. 190)
- The A87 Trunk Road (Portree to Prabost) (Temporary Prohibition on Use of Road) Order 2022 (S.S.I. 2022 No. 191)
- The Coronavirus (Scotland) (No. 2) Act 2020 (Suspension: Termination of Student Residential Tenancy) Regulations 2022 (S.S.I. 2022 No. 192)
- The Meat Preparations (Import Conditions) (Scotland) Amendment Regulations 2022 (S.S.I. 2022 No. 193)
- The Prisons and Young Offenders Institutions (Scotland) Amendment Rules 2022 (S.S.I. 2022 No. 194)
- The Animal Health and Welfare (Scotland) Act 2006 (Consequential Provisions) Order 2022 (S.S.I. 2022 No. 195)
- The A82 Trunk Road (Falls of Falloch) (Temporary Clearway) Order 2022 (S.S.I. 2022 No. 196)
- The A830 Trunk Road (Morar) (Temporary Clearway) Order 2022 (S.S.I. 2022 No. 197)
- The A835 Trunk Road (Ben Wyvis) (Temporary Clearway) Order 2022 (S.S.I. 2022 No. 198)
- The A87 Trunk Road (Eilean Donan) (Temporary Clearway) Order 2022 (S.S.I. 2022 No. 199)
- The A84/A85 Trunk Road (Loch Lubnaig) (Temporary Clearway) Order 2022 (S.S.I. 2022 No. 200)

== 201-300 ==
- The Gender Recognition (Marriage and Civil Partnership Registration) (Scotland) Amendment Regulations 2022 (S.S.I. 2022 No. 201)
- The Gender Recognition (Marriage and Civil Partnership Registration) (Modification) (Scotland) Amendment Order 2022 (S.S.I. 2022 No. 202)
- The Vegetable Plant Material and Fruit Plant and Propagating Material (EU Exit) (Scotland) (Amendment) Regulations 2022 (S.S.I. 2022 No. 203)
- The Transport (Scotland) Act 2019 (Commencement No. 5) Regulations 2022 (S.S.I. 2022 No. 204 (C. 11))
- The Non-Domestic Rates (Valuation Notices) (Scotland) Regulations 2022 (S.S.I. 2022 No. 205)
- The Rural Support (Simplification and Improvement) (Scotland) Regulations 2022 (S.S.I. 2022 No. 206)
- The Companies Act 2006 (Scottish public sector companies to be audited by the Auditor General for Scotland) Order 2022 (S.S.I. 2022 No. 207)
- The Period Products (Free Provision) (Scotland) Act 2021 (Commencement No. 2) Regulations 2022 (S.S.I. 2022 No. 208 (C. 12))
- The Building (Scotland) Amendment (Amendment) Regulations 2022 (S.S.I. 2022 No. 209)
- The Offensive Weapons Act 2019 (Prescribed Documents) (Scotland) (No. 2) Order 2022 (S.S.I. 2022 No. 210)
- Act of Sederunt (Simple Procedure Amendment) (Miscellaneous) 2022 (S.S.I. 2022 No. 211)
- The Public Health etc. (Scotland) Act 2008 (Notifiable Diseases and Notifiable Organisms) Amendment Regulations 2022 (S.S.I. 2022 No. 212)
- The National Health Service (Charges to Overseas Visitors) (Scotland) Amendment (No. 2) Regulations 2022 (S.S.I. 2022 No. 213)
- The Sheriff Court Fees Amendment Order 2022 (S.S.I. 2022 No. 214)
- The M9/A9 Trunk Road (Cross Tay Link Road) (Temporary Prohibitions of Traffic, Overtaking and Specified Turns and Temporary Speed Restrictions) Order 2022 (S.S.I. 2022 No. 215)
- The A85 Trunk Road (Comrie) (Temporary Prohibition on Use of Road) (No. 3) Order 2022 (S.S.I. 2022 No. 216)
- The Disability Assistance for Working Age People (Transitional Provisions and Miscellaneous Amendment) (Scotland) Regulations 2022 (S.S.I. 2022 No. 217)
- The Criminal Justice Act 1988 (Offensive Weapons) (Amendment, Surrender and Compensation) (Scotland) Order 2022 (S.S.I. 2022 No. 218)
- The Surrender of Offensive Weapons (Compensation) (Scotland) Regulations 2022 (S.S.I. 2022 No. 219)
- The A83 Trunk Road (Tarbert) (Temporary Prohibition on Use of Road) Order 2022 (S.S.I. 2022 No. 220)
- The North West Scotland Trunk Roads (Temporary Prohibitions of Traffic and Overtaking and Temporary Speed Restrictions) (No. 6) Order 2022 (S.S.I. 2022 No. 221)
- The South East Scotland Trunk Roads (Temporary Prohibitions of Traffic and Overtaking and Temporary Speed Restrictions) (No. 6) Order 2022 (S.S.I. 2022 No. 222)
- The South West Scotland Trunk Roads (Temporary Prohibitions of Traffic and Overtaking and Temporary Speed Restrictions) (No. 5) Order 2022 (S.S.I. 2022 No. 223)
- The North East Scotland Trunk Roads (Temporary Prohibitions of Traffic and Overtaking and Temporary Speed Restrictions) (No. 6) Order 2022 (S.S.I. 2022 No. 224)
- The Cross-border Placements (Effect of Deprivation of Liberty Orders) (Scotland) Regulations 2022 (S.S.I. 2022 No. 225)
- The M8 (Newhouse to Easterhouse) M73 (Maryville to Mollinsburn) M74 (Daldowie to Hamilton) A8 (Newhouse to Bargeddie) A725 (Shawhead to Whistleberry) A7071 (Bellshill) Trunk Roads (Temporary Prohibitions of Traffic and Overtaking and Temporary Speed Restrictions) (No. 2) Order 2022 (S.S.I. 2022 No. 226)
- The A85 Trunk Road (Methven) (Temporary Prohibition on Waiting, Loading and Unloading) Order 2022 (S.S.I. 2022 No. 227)
- The A85 Trunk Road (Methven) (Temporary Prohibition on Waiting, Loading and Unloading) (No. 2) Order 2022 (S.S.I. 2022 No. 228)
- The Legal Aid and Advice and Assistance (Miscellaneous Amendment) (Scotland) (No. 2) Regulations 2022 (S.S.I. 2022 No. 229)
- The Plant Health (Fees) (Miscellaneous Amendment) (Scotland) Regulations 2022 (S.S.I. 2022 No. 230)
- Act of Adjournal (Criminal Procedure Rules 1996 Amendment) (Overseas Production Orders) 2022 (S.S.I. 2022 No. 231)
- The Registers of Scotland (Information and Access, etc.) Miscellaneous Amendment Order 2022 (S.S.I. 2022 No. 232)
- The Scottish Landfill Tax (Prescribed Landfill Site Activities) Amendment Order 2022 (S.S.I. 2022 No. 233)
- The A78 Trunk Road (Greenock) (Temporary Prohibition on Use of Road) Order 2022 (S.S.I. 2022 No. 234)
- The A82 Trunk Road (Loch Ness Clansman Hotel) (Temporary Clearway) Order 2022 (S.S.I. 2022 No. 235)
- The A83 Trunk Road (Inveraray) (Temporary Prohibition on Use of Road) Order 2022 (S.S.I. 2022 No. 236)
- The A85 Trunk Road (Comrie) (Temporary Prohibition on Use of Road) (No. 4) Order 2022 (S.S.I. 2022 No. 237)
- The A85 Trunk Road (Lochearnhead) (Temporary Prohibition on Use of Road) Order 2022 (S.S.I. 2022 No. 238)
- The South East Scotland Trunk Roads (Temporary Prohibitions of Traffic and Overtaking and Temporary Speed Restrictions) (No. 7) Order 2022 (S.S.I. 2022 No. 239)
- The North East Scotland Trunk Roads (Temporary Prohibitions of Traffic and Overtaking and Temporary Speed Restrictions) (No. 7) Order 2022 (S.S.I. 2022 No. 240)
- The North West Scotland Trunk Roads (Temporary Prohibitions of Traffic and Overtaking and Temporary Speed Restrictions) (No. 7) Order 2022 (S.S.I. 2022 No. 241)
- The A76 Trunk Road (New Cumnock) (Temporary Prohibition on Waiting, Loading and Unloading) Order 2022 (S.S.I. 2022 No. 242)
- The A737 Trunk Road (Howwood) (Temporary 30 mph Speed Restriction) Order 2022 (S.S.I. 2022 No. 243)
- The A87 Trunk Road (Breakish) (40 mph Speed Limit) Order 2022 (S.S.I. 2022 No. 244)
- The M8 (Newhouse to Easterhouse) M73 (Maryville to Mollinsburn) M74 (Daldowie to Hamilton) A725 (Shawhead to Whistleberry) Trunk Roads (Temporary Prohibitions of Traffic and Overtaking and Temporary Speed Restrictions) (No. 3) Order 2022 (S.S.I. 2022 No. 245)
- The A83 Trunk Road (Tarbert) (Temporary Prohibition on Use, Waiting, Loading and Unloading) Order 2022 (S.S.I. 2022 No. 246)
- The M74/A74 Trunk Road (Hamilton) (Temporary 40 mph Speed Restriction) Order 2022 (S.S.I. 2022 No. 247)
- The A85 Trunk Road (Crieff) (Temporary Prohibition on Use of Road) Order 2022 (S.S.I. 2022 No. 248)
- The Civil Protection Measures, European Protection Order and Victims’ Rights (EU Exit) (Scotland) (Amendment Etc.) Regulations 2022 ( S.S.I. 2022 No. 249)
- Act of Sederunt (Rules of the Court of Session 1994 Amendment) (Court Sittings) 2022 (S.S.I. 2022 No. 250)
- The M9/A9 and A95 Trunk Roads (Granish to Grantown-On-Spey) (Temporary Prohibition on Use of Road and Specified Turns) Order 2022 (S.S.I. 2022 No. 251)
- The North West Scotland Trunk Roads (Temporary Prohibitions of Traffic and Overtaking and Temporary Speed Restrictions) (No. 8) Order 2022 (S.S.I. 2022 No. 252)
- The South East Scotland Trunk Roads (Temporary Prohibitions of Traffic and Overtaking and Temporary Speed Restrictions) (No. 8) Order 2022 (S.S.I. 2022 No. 253)
- The South West Scotland Trunk Roads (Temporary Prohibitions of Traffic and Overtaking and Temporary Speed Restrictions) (No. 6) Order 2022 (S.S.I. 2022 No. 254)
- The North East Scotland Trunk Roads (Temporary Prohibitions of Traffic and Overtaking and Temporary Speed Restrictions) (No. 8) Order 2022 (S.S.I. 2022 No. 255)
- The M8 (Newhouse to Easterhouse) M73 (Maryville to Mollinsburn) A8 (Newhouse to Bargeddie) A725 (Shawhead to Whistleberry) Trunk Roads (Temporary Prohibitions of Traffic and Overtaking and Temporary Speed Restrictions) (No. 3) Order 2022 (S.S.I. 2022 No. 256)
- The A82 Trunk Road (Fort Augustus) (Temporary Prohibition on Waiting) Order 2022 (S.S.I. 2022 No. 257)
- The A9 Trunk Road (Kessock Bridge) (Temporary Prohibition of Pedestrians and Temporary 30 mph Speed Restriction) Order 2022 (S.S.I. 2022 No. 258)
- The A83 Trunk Road (Inveraray) (Temporary Prohibition of Use, Pedestrians and Waiting, Loading and Unloading) Order 2022 (S.S.I. 2022 No. 259)
- The A85 Trunk Road (Oban) (Temporary Prohibition on Use of Road) (No. 2) Order 2022 (S.S.I. 2022 No. 260)
- The Coronavirus (Scotland) Acts (Saving Provision) Regulations 2022 (S.S.I. 2022 No. 261)
- The Non-Commercial Movement of Pet Animals (Scotland) Amendment (No. 2) Regulations 2022 (S.S.I. 2022 No. 262)
- The Sports Grounds and Sporting Events (Designation) (Scotland) Amendment (No. 2) Order 2022 (S.S.I. 2022 No. 263)
- The Children's Hearings (Scotland) Act 2011 (Rules of Procedure in Children's Hearings) Amendment Rules 2022 (S.S.I. 2022 No. 264)
- The Food Information (Transitional Provisions) (Miscellaneous Amendments) (Scotland) Regulations 2022 (S.S.I. 2022 No. 265)
- The Local Electoral Administration and Registration Services (Scotland) Act 2006 (Commencement No. 7) Order 2022 (S.S.I. 2022 No. 266 (C. 13))
- The Registration of Births, Still-births and Deaths (Prescription of Forms and Attestation) (Miscellaneous Amendment) (Scotland) Regulations 2022 (S.S.I. 2022 No. 267)
- The Judicial Appointments Board for Scotland (Membership) Modification Order 2022 (S.S.I. 2022 No. 268)
- The A78 Trunk Road (Main Street, Largs) (Temporary Prohibition on Use, Waiting, Loading and Unloading) Order 2022 (S.S.I. 2022 No. 269)
- The A82 Trunk Road (Glencoe) (Temporary Prohibition on Use of Road and Temporary 30 mph Speed Restriction) Order 2022 (S.S.I. 2022 No. 270)
- The Council Tax Reduction and Council Tax (Discounts) (Miscellaneous Amendment) (No. 2) (Scotland) Regulations 2022 (S.S.I. 2022 No. 271)
- The Council Tax (Exempt Dwellings) (Scotland) Amendment (No. 2) Order 2022 (S.S.I. 2022 No. 272)
- The A6091/A7 Trunk Road (Parkdaill) (40 mph Speed Limit) Order 2022 (S.S.I. 2022 No. 273)
- The Coronavirus (Recovery and Reform) (Scotland) Act 2022 (Commencement No. 1) Regulations 2022 (S.S.I. 2022 No. 274 (C. 14))
- The Planning (Scotland) Act 2019 (Commencement No. 9 and Saving and Transitional Provisions) Regulations 2022 (S.S.I. 2022 No. 275 (C. 15))
- The Health (Tobacco, Nicotine etc. and Care) (Scotland) Act 2016 (Supplementary Provision) Regulations 2022 (S.S.I. 2022 No. 276)
- Act of Sederunt (Rules of the Court of Session 1994 Amendment) (Recognition and Enforcement of Judgments) 2022 (S.S.I. 2022 No. 277)
- The Financial Assistance for Environmental Purposes (Scotland) (No. 2) Order 2022 (S.S.I. 2022 No. 278)
- The Rural Support (Simplification and Improvement) (Scotland) (No. 2) Regulations 2022 (S.S.I. 2022 No. 279)
- The Fireworks and Pyrotechnic Articles (Scotland) Act 2022 (Commencement No. 1) Regulations 2022 (S.S.I. 2022 No. 280 (C. 16))
- The A68 (Lauder and Jedburgh) A6091/A7 (Selkirk and Hawick) A702 (West Linton and Carlops) Trunk Roads (Temporary 20 mph Speed Restriction) Order 2022 (S.S.I. 2022 No. 281)
- The A77 Trunk Road (Girvan) (Temporary Prohibition on Waiting) Order 2022 (S.S.I. 2022 No. 282)
- The South East Scotland Trunk Roads (Temporary Prohibitions of Traffic and Overtaking and Temporary Speed Restrictions) (No. 9) Order 2022 (S.S.I. 2022 No. 283)
- The North West Scotland Trunk Roads (Temporary Prohibitions of Traffic and Overtaking and Temporary Speed Restrictions) (No. 9) Order 2022 (S.S.I. 2022 No. 284)
- The North East Scotland Trunk Roads (Temporary Prohibitions of Traffic and Overtaking and Temporary Speed Restrictions) (No. 9) Order 2022 (S.S.I. 2022 No. 285)
- The Town and Country Planning (Miscellaneous Amendment) (Scotland) Regulations

2022 (S.S.I. 2022 No. 286)

- The Scottish Tribunals (Listed Tribunals) Regulations 2022 (S.S.I. 2022 No. 287)
- The Feed Additives (Authorisations) (Scotland) Regulations 2022 (S.S.I. 2022 No. 288)
- Act of Sederunt (Ordinary Cause Rules 1993 Amendment) (Case Management of Defended Family and Civil Partnership Actions) 2022 (S.S.I. 2022 No. 289)
- The M8 (Newhouse to Easterhouse) M73 (Maryville to Mollinsburn) M74 (Daldowie to Hamilton) A8 (Newhouse to Bargeddie) A725 (Shawhead to Whistleberry) A7071 (Bellshill) Trunk Roads (Temporary Prohibitions of Traffic and Overtaking and Temporary Speed Restrictions) (No. 3) Order 2022 (S.S.I. 2022 No. 290)
- The A78 Trunk Road (Main Street, Largs) (Temporary Prohibition on Use, Waiting, Loading and Unloading) (No. 2) Order 2022 (S.S.I. 2022 No. 291)
- The Advice and Assistance (Summary Criminal Proceedings) (Miscellaneous Amendment) (Scotland) Regulations 2022 (S.S.I. 2022 No. 292)
- The Age of Criminal Responsibility (Reports on Use of Places of Safety) (Scotland) Regulations 2022 (S.S.I. 2022 No. 293)
- The Education (Listed Bodies) (Scotland) Amendment Order 2022 (S.S.I. 2022 No. 294)
- Act of Sederunt (Simple Procedure Amendment) (Miscellaneous) (No. 2) 2022 (S.S.I. 2022 No. 295)
- The Consumer Scotland (Transfer of Functions) Regulations 2022 (S.S.I. 2022 No. 296)
- The South East Scotland Trunk Roads (Temporary Prohibitions of Traffic and Overtaking and Temporary Speed Restrictions) (No. 10) Order 2022 (S.S.I. 2022 No. 297)
- The North East Scotland Trunk Roads (Temporary Prohibitions of Traffic and Overtaking and Temporary Speed Restrictions) (No. 10) Order 2022 (S.S.I. 2022 No. 298)
- The North West Scotland Trunk Roads (Temporary Prohibitions of Traffic and Overtaking and Temporary Speed Restrictions) (No. 10) Order 2022 (S.S.I. 2022 No. 299)
- The South West Scotland Trunk Roads (Temporary Prohibitions of Traffic and Overtaking and Temporary Speed Restrictions) (No. 7) Order 2022 (S.S.I. 2022 No. 300)

== 301-388 ==
- The Non-Domestic Rates (Scotland) Act 2020 (Commencement No. 2, Transitional and Saving Provisions) Amendment (No. 2) Regulations 2022 (S.S.I. 2022 No. 301 (C. 17))
- The Scottish Child Payment (Saving Provisions) Regulations 2022 (S.S.I. 2022 No. 302)
- The A83 Trunk Road (Lochgilphead) (Temporary Prohibition on Use of Road) Order 2022 (S.S.I. 2022 No. 303)
- The A85 Trunk Road (Comrie) (Temporary Prohibition on Use of Road) (No. 5) Order 2022 (S.S.I. 2022 No. 304)
- The Environment Act 2021 (Commencement and Saving Provision) (Scotland) Regulations 2022 (S.S.I. 2022 No. 305 (C. 18))
- The M8 (Newhouse to Easterhouse) M73 (Maryville to Mollinsburn) M74 (Daldowie to Hamilton) A725 (Shawhead to Whistleberry) Trunk Roads (Temporary Prohibitions of Traffic and Overtaking and Temporary Speed Restrictions) (No. 4) Order 2022 (S.S.I. 2022 No. 306)
- The Assured Tenancies and Private Residential Tenancies (Prescribed Notices and Forms) (Miscellaneous Temporary Modifications) (Scotland) Regulations 2022 (S.S.I. 2022 No. 307)
- The Companies Act 2006 (Scottish public sector companies to be audited by the Auditor General for Scotland) (No. 2) Order 2022 (S.S.I. 2022 No. 308)
- Not Allocated (S.S.I. 2022 No. 309)
- The Electricity (Applications for Consent and Variation of Consent) (Fees) (Scotland) Amendment Regulations 2022 (S.S.I. 2022 No. 310)
- The A82 Trunk Road (Spean Bridge) (Temporary Prohibition on Use of Road) Order 2022 (S.S.I. 2022 No. 311)
- The A83 Trunk Road (Inveraray) (Temporary Prohibition on Use of Road) (No. 2) Order 2022 (S.S.I. 2022 No. 312)
- The A83 Trunk Road (Arrochar) (Temporary Prohibition on Use of Road) Order 2022 (S.S.I. 2022 No. 313)
- The A68 Trunk Road (Cranstoun Church) (Temporary Prohibition on Use of Road) Order 2022 (S.S.I. 2022 No. 314)
- The A85 Trunk Road (Oban) (Temporary Prohibition on Use of Road) (No. 3) Order 2022 (S.S.I. 2022 No. 315)
- The A96 Trunk Road (Keith) (Temporary Prohibition on Use of Road) Order 2022 (S.S.I. 2022 No. 316)
- The A83 Trunk Road (Campbeltown) (Temporary Prohibition on Use of Road) Order 2022 (S.S.I. 2022 No. 317)
- The A84 (Callander) (Temporary Prohibition on Use of Road) Order 2022 (S.S.I. 2022 No. 318)
- The A90 Trunk Road (Fraserburgh) (Temporary Prohibition on Use of Road) Order 2022 (S.S.I. 2022 No. 319)
- The M9/A9 Trunk Road (Thurso) (Temporary Prohibition on Use of Road) Order 2022 (S.S.I. 2022 No. 320)
- The A87 Trunk Road (Balmacara) (Temporary Prohibition on Use of Road) Order 2022 (S.S.I. 2022 No. 321)
- he A78 Trunk Road (Inverkip) (Temporary Prohibition on Use of Road) Order 2022( S.S.I. 2022 No. 322)
- The A84 Trunk Road (Doune) (Temporary Prohibition on Use of Road) Order 2022 (S.S.I. 2022 No. 323)
- The A83 Trunk Road (Tarbert) (Temporary Prohibition on Use of Road) (No. 2) Order 2022 (S.S.I. 2022 No. 324)
- The A83 Trunk Road (Lochgilphead) (Temporary Prohibition on Use of Road) (No. 2) Order 2022 (S.S.I. 2022 No. 325)
- The Scottish Child Payment (Ancillary Provision) Regulations 2022 (S.S.I. 2022 No. 326)
- The Scottish Biometrics Commissioner Act 2020 (Code of Practice) (Appointed Day) (Scotland) Regulations 2022 (S.S.I. 2022 No. 327)
- The Seed (Equivalence of Countries) (Amendment) (Scotland) Regulations 2022 (S.S.I. 2022 No. 328)
- Act of Sederunt (Rules of the Court of Session 1994 and Sheriff Court Rules Amendment) (Civil Protection Measures (EU Exit)) 2022 (S.S.I. 2022 No. 329)
- The Producer Responsibility Obligations (Packaging Waste) Amendment (Scotland) Regulations 2022 (S.S.I. 2022 No. 330)
- The A9 Trunk Road (Brora) (Temporary Prohibition on Use of Road) Order 2022 (S.S.I. 2022 No. 331)
- The Transport (Scotland) Act 2019 (Commencement No. 6) Regulations 2022 (S.S.I. 2022 No. 332 (C. 19))
- The A85 Trunk Road (Oban) (Temporary Prohibition on Use of Road) (No. 4) Order 2022 (S.S.I. 2022 No. 333)
- The Tuberculosis (Scotland) Amendment Order 2022 (S.S.I. 2022 No. 334)
- The National Health Service (Charges to Overseas Visitors) (Scotland) Amendment (No. 3) Regulations 2022 (S.S.I. 2022 No. 335)
- The Social Security (Miscellaneous Amendment and Transitional Provision) (Scotland) Regulations 2022 (S.S.I. 2022 No. 336)
- The A85 Trunk Road (Comrie) (Temporary Prohibition of Waiting, Loading and Unloading) Order 2022 (S.S.I. 2022 No. 337)
- The M8/A8/A8(M) Trunk Road Junction 15 (Townhead) to Junction 18 (Charing Cross) (Temporary Prohibition of Traffic and Temporary Speed Restrictions) Order 2022 (S.S.I. 2022 No. 338)
- The A82 Trunk Road (Fort William) (Temporary Prohibition on Use of Road) (No. 2) Order 2022 (S.S.I. 2022 No. 339)
- The Building (Scotland) Amendment (Amendment) (No. 2) Regulations 2022 (S.S.I. 2022 No. 340)
- The Official Controls (Import of High Risk Food and Feed of Non-Animal Origin) Amendment (Scotland) Regulations 2022 (S.S.I. 2022 No. 341)
- The Processed Cereal-based Foods and Baby Foods for Infants and Young Children (Scotland) Amendment Regulations 2022 (S.S.I. 2022 No. 342)
- The A83 Trunk Road (Campbeltown) (Temporary Prohibition on Use of Road) (No. 2) Order 2022 (S.S.I. 2022 No. 343)
- The North East Scotland Trunk Roads (Temporary Prohibitions of Traffic and Overtaking and Temporary Speed Restrictions) (No. 11) Order 2022 (S.S.I. 2022 No. 344)
- The North West Scotland Trunk Roads (Temporary Prohibitions of Traffic and Overtaking and Temporary Speed Restrictions) (No. 11) Order 2022 (S.S.I. 2022 No. 345)
- The South West Scotland Trunk Roads (Temporary Prohibitions of Traffic and Overtaking and Temporary Speed Restrictions) (No. 8) Order 2022 (S.S.I. 2022 No. 346)
- The A85 Trunk Road (Oban) (Temporary Prohibition on Use of Road) (No. 5) Order 2022 (S.S.I. 2022 No. 347)
- The South East Scotland Trunk Roads (Temporary Prohibitions of Traffic and Overtaking and Temporary Speed Restrictions) (No. 11) Order 2022 (S.S.I. 2022 No. 348)
- The Building (Scotland) Amendment (No. 2) Regulations 2022 (S.S.I. 2022 No. 349)
- The M77/A77 Trunk Road (Girvan) (Temporary Prohibition on Use of Road) Order 2022 (S.S.I. 2022 No. 350)
- The A76 Trunk Road (Sanquhar) (Temporary Prohibition on Waiting, Loading and Unloading) Order 2022 (S.S.I. 2022 No. 351)
- The Common Organisation of the Markets in Agricultural Products (Poultrymeat) (Miscellaneous Temporary Amendments) (Scotland) Regulations 2022 (S.S.I. 2022 No. 352)
- The M8 (Newhouse to Easterhouse) M73 (Maryville to Mollinsburn) A8 (Newhouse to Bargeddie) A725 (Shawhead to Whistleberry) Trunk Roads (Temporary Prohibitions of Traffic and Overtaking and Temporary Speed Restrictions) (No. 4) Order 2022 (S.S.I. 2022 No. 353)
- The M90/A90/A9000 Trunk Road (Fraserburgh) (Temporary Prohibition on Use of Road) (No. 2) Order 2022 (S.S.I. 2022 No. 354)
- Act of Sederunt (Messengers-at-Arms and Sheriff Officers Rules) (Amendment) 2022 (S.S.I. 2022 No. 355)
- The Homeless Persons (Suspension of Referrals between Local Authorities) (Scotland) Order 2022 (S.S.I. 2022 No. 356)
- The A84 Trunk Road (Callander) (Temporary Prohibition on Use of Road) (No. 2) Order 2022 (S.S.I. 2022 No. 357)
- The Public Service Vehicles (Registration of Local Services) (Provision of Service Information) (Scotland) Regulations 2022 (S.S.I. 2022 No. 358)
- The A83 Trunk Road (Inveraray) (Temporary Prohibition on Use of Road) (No. 3) Order 2022 (S.S.I. 2022 No. 359)
- The Pavement Parking Prohibition (Exemption Orders Procedure) (Scotland) Regulations 2022 (S.S.I. 2022 No. 360)
- The Agriculture (Retained EU Law and Data) (Scotland) Act 2020 (Consequential Modifications) and Agricultural Products, Aquatic Animal Health and Genetically Modified Organisms (EU Exit) (Amendment) Regulations 2022 (S.S.I. 2022 No. 361)
- The Education (Fees and Student Support) (Miscellaneous Amendment) (Scotland) Regulations 2022 (S.S.I. 2022 No. 362)
- The Conservation of Salmon (Scotland) Amendment Regulations 2022 (S.S.I. 2022 No. 363)
- The First-tier Tribunal for Scotland Local Taxation Chamber (Rules of Procedure) Regulations 2022 (S.S.I. 2022 No. 364)
- The Upper Tribunal for Scotland (Local Taxation Rules of Procedure) Regulations 2022 (S.S.I. 2022 No. 365)
- The A78 Trunk Road (Greenock) (Temporary Prohibition on Use of Road) (No. 2) Order 2022 (S.S.I. 2022 No. 366)
- The A701 Trunk Road (Heathhall) (Temporary Prohibition on

Waiting, Loading and Unloading) Order 2022 (S.S.I. 2022 No. 367)

- The Valuation Timetable (Scotland) Order 2022 (S.S.I. 2022 No. 368)
- The Valuation (Proposals Procedure) (Scotland) Regulations 2022 (S.S.I. 2022 No. 369)
- The Valuation Roll and Valuation Notice (Scotland) Order 2022 (S.S.I. 2022 No. 370)
- The Official Controls and Import Conditions (Transitional Periods) (Miscellaneous Amendment) (Scotland) Regulations 2022 (S.S.I. 2022 No. 371)
- The Red Rocks and Longay Marine Conservation Order 2022 (S.S.I. 2022 No. 372)
- The Food and Feed (Miscellaneous Amendments) (Scotland) Regulations 2022 (S.S.I. 2022 No. 373)
- The International Organisations (Immunities and Privileges) (Scotland) Amendment Order 2022 (S.S.I. 2022 No. 374)
- The Land and Buildings Transaction Tax (additional amount: transactions relating to second homes etc.) (Scotland) Amendment Order 2022 (S.S.I. 2022 No. 375)
- The Heat Networks (Scotland) Act 2021 (Commencement) (No. 1) Regulations 2022 (S.S.I. 2022 No. 376 (C. 20))
- The St Mary's Music School (Aided Places) (Scotland) Amendment (No. 2) Regulations 2022 (S.S.I. 2022 No. 377)
- The Rehabilitation of Offenders Act 1974 (Exclusions and Exceptions) (Scotland) Amendment (No. 2) Order 2022 (S.S.I. 2022 No. 378)
- The Police Act 1997 (Offences in Schedules 8A and 8B) Amendment (Scotland) Regulations 2022 (S.S.I. 2022 No. 379)
- The A702 Trunk Road (Biggar) (Temporary Prohibition on Use of Road) Order 2022 (S.S.I. 2022 No. 380)
- The A9 Trunk Road (Brora) (Temporary Prohibition on Use of Road) (No. 2) Order 2022 (S.S.I. 2022 No. 381)
- The North East Scotland Trunk Roads (Temporary Prohibitions of Traffic and Overtaking and Temporary Speed Restrictions) (No. 12) Order 2022 (S.S.I. 2022 No. 382)
- The North West Scotland Trunk Roads (Temporary Prohibitions of Traffic and Overtaking and Temporary Speed Restrictions) (No. 12) Order 2022 (S.S.I. 2022 No. 383)
- The South East Scotland Trunk Roads (Temporary Prohibitions of Traffic and Overtaking and Temporary Speed Restrictions) (No. 12) Order 2022 (S.S.I. 2022 No. 384)
- The Parole Board (Scotland) Rules 2022 (S.S.I. 2022 No. 385)
- The Planning (Scotland) Act 2019 (Commencement No. 10) Regulations 2022 (S.S.I. 2022 No. 386 (C. 21))
- The Public Water Supplies (Scotland) Amendment Regulations 2022 (S.S.I. 2022 No. 387)
- The M8 (Newhouse to Easterhouse) M73 (Maryville to Mollinsburn) M74 (Daldowie to Hamilton) A8 (Newhouse to Bargeddie) A725 (Shawhead to Whistleberry) A7071 (Bellshill) Trunk Roads (Temporary Prohibitions of Traffic and Overtaking and Temporary Speed Restrictions) (No. 4) Order 2022 (S.S.I. 2022 No. 388)
