= Politics of Scotland =

Politics of Scotland Poilitigs na h-Alba
- The coat of arms as used in Scotland
- Polity type: Devolved parliamentary legislature within a constitutional monarchy

Legislative branch
- Name: Scottish Parliament
- Type: Unicameral
- Meeting place: Holyrood
- Presiding officer: Kenneth Gibson, Presiding Officer
- Appointer: Scottish Parliament

Executive branch
- Head of state
- Title: Monarch
- Currently: Charles III
- Head of government
- Title: First Minister
- Currently: John Swinney
- Appointer: Monarch
- Cabinet
- Name: Scottish Cabinet
- Current cabinet: Second Swinney government
- Leader: First Minister
- Deputy leader: Deputy First Minister
- Appointer: The Monarch
- Headquarters: St. Andrew's House, Edinburgh
- Ministries: 30

Judicial branch
- Name: Scots law
- Courts: Scottish courts
- Supreme Courts of Scotland
- Chief judge: Lord Pentland
- Seat: Parliament House, Edinburgh
- Court of Session
- Chief judge: Lord Pentland
- Seat: Parliament House
- High Court of Justiciary
- Chief judge: Lord Pentland
- Seat: Parliament House; Justiciary Building (Edinburgh); Justiciary Building (Glasgow); Mercatgate, (Aberdeen)

Civil service branch
- Name: Permanent Secretary to the Scottish Government
- President: Joe Griffin
- Members: Directorates of the Scottish Government

Scotland (Scottish Gaelic: Alba) is a devolved parliamentary democratic country within a parliamentary constitutional monarchy and a country of the United Kingdom. The country’s population is represented in both the Scottish Parliament and the Parliament of the United Kingdom since the Scotland Act 1998. The head of state is the Monarch whose official residence when in Scotland is Holyrood Palace.

Most executive power is exercised by the Scottish Government, led by the first minister, the head of government in a multi-party system. The judiciary of Scotland, dealing with Scots law, is independent of the legislature and the Scottish Government, and is headed by the Lord President of the Court of Session. Scots law is primarily determined by the Scottish Parliament. The Scottish Government shares some executive powers, notably over reserved matters, with the Scotland Office, led by the Secretary of State for Scotland.

The Kingdom of Scotland entered a fiscal and political union with the Kingdom of England with the Acts of Union 1707, by which the Parliament of Scotland was abolished along with its English counterpart to form the Parliament of Great Britain, and from that time Scotland has been represented by members of the House of Commons in Westminster. The Scottish Parliament was re–convened in 1999 as a result of the Scotland Act 1998 and the preceding 1997 Scottish devolution referendum, held under the Referendums (Scotland and Wales) Act 1997.

The issues of Scottish nationalism and Scottish independence are prominent political issues in the early 21st century. The Scottish National Party (SNP) formed a majority government following the 2011 Scottish Parliament election, and passed the Scottish Independence Referendum Act 2013, with the Edinburgh Agreement enabling the 2014 Scottish independence referendum. The referendum was held on 18 September 2014, with 55.3% voting to stay in the United Kingdom and 44.7% voting for independence.

== History ==
=== Kingdom of Scotland ===
The unified kingdoms of Dál Riata, Cat, Cé, Fortriu, Fib, Strathclyde, Galloway, Northumbria and the Earldom of Orkney became the Kingdom of Scotland, an independent sovereign state which existed until the signing of the Treaty of Union in 1707 with the Kingdom of England. The unified Kingdom of Scotland retained some of the ritual aspects of Pictish and Scottish kingship. These can be seen in the elaborate ritual coronation at the Stone of Scone at Scone Abbey. While the Scottish monarchy in the Middle Ages was a largely itinerant institution, Scone remained one of its most important locations, with royal castles at Stirling and Perth becoming significant in the later Middle Ages before Edinburgh developed as a capital city in the second half of the 15th century.

The Crown was the most important element of government in the Kingdom of Scotland despite the many royal minorities. In the late Middle Ages, it saw much of the aggrandisement associated with the New Monarchs elsewhere in Europe. Theories of constitutional monarchy and resistance were articulated by Scots, particularly George Buchanan, in the 16th century, but James VI of Scotland advanced the theory of the divine right of kings, and these debates were restated in subsequent reigns and crises. The court remained at the centre of political life, and in the 16th century emerged as a major centre of display and artistic patronage, until it was effectively dissolved with the Union of the Crowns in 1603.

The Parliament of Scotland also emerged as a major legal institution, gaining an oversight of taxation and policy. By the end of the Middle Ages it was sitting almost every year, partly because of the frequent royal minorities and regencies of the period, which may have prevented it from being sidelined by the monarchy. In the early modern era, Parliament was also vital to the running of the country, providing laws and taxation, but it had fluctuating fortunes and was never as central to the national life as its counterpart in England.

=== Treaty of Union ===
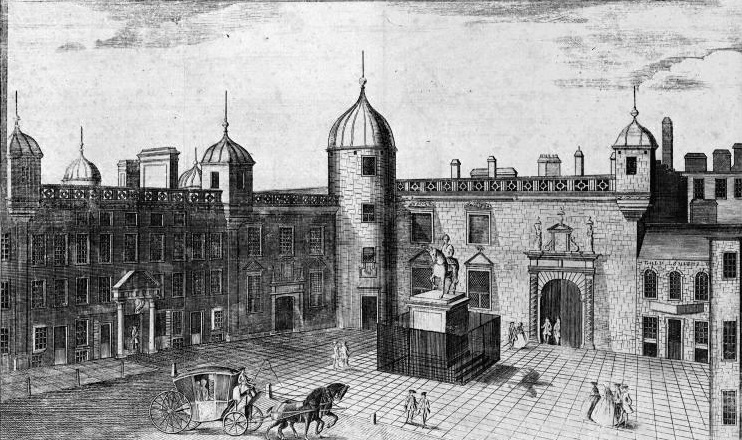
The pre-union Kingdom of Scotland's government met at Parliament House, Edinburgh

The signing of the Treaty of Union in 1707 with the Kingdom of England ended both Scotland and England's political independence, unifying both countries into a new state known as the Kingdom of Great Britain. The Parliament of Scotland, the Kingdom of Scotland's legislature situated at Parliament House, Edinburgh, was merged with the Parliament of England to establish the new Parliament of Great Britain which would be based in London.

Following the ratification of the Treaty of Union, Parliament House became the seat of the Supreme Courts of Scotland in which it remains today. Under the terms of the Treaty of Union, various elements of independence from England was retained for Scotland, such as a separate education and legal system (including the Scottish court system – Court of Session and High Court of Justiciary) as was the countries church and religion. Additionally, the Crown of Scotland and the Honours of Scotland were to remain in Scotland, as were all parliamentary and other official records.

Until 1832, Scottish politics remained very much in the control of landowners in the country, and of small cliques of merchants in the burghs. Agitation against this position through the Friends of the People Society in the 1790s met with Lord Braxfield's explicit repression on behalf of the landed interests. The Scottish Reform Act 1832 rearranged the constituencies and increased the electorate from under 5,000 to 65,000. The Representation of the People (Scotland) Act 1868 extended the electorate to 232,000 but with "residential qualifications peculiar to Scotland". However, by 1885 around 50% of the male population had the vote, the secret ballot had become established, and the modern political era had started.

=== Liberal and Labour Party dominance ===
From 1885 to 1918 the Liberal Party almost totally dominated Scottish politics. Only in the general election of 1931 and the general election of 1955 did the Unionist Party, together with their National Liberal and Conservative Party (UK) allies, win a majority of votes.

Following the coupon election of 1918, 1922 saw the emergence of the Labour Party as a major force, and replacing the Liberals as one of the two dominant parties. Red Clydeside elected a number of Labour MPs. A Communist was elected for Motherwell in 1924, but in essence the 1920s saw a 3-way fight between Labour, the Liberals and the Unionists. The National Party of Scotland contested their first seat in 1929. It merged with the centre-right Scottish Party in 1934 to form the Scottish National Party, but the SNP remained a peripheral force until the watershed Hamilton by-election of 1967.

The Communists won West Fife in 1935 and again in 1945 (Willie Gallacher) and several Glasgow Labour MPs joined the Independent Labour Party in the 1930s, often defeating the official Labour candidates by wide margins.

The National Government won the vast majority of Scottish seats in 1931 and 1935. The Liberal Party, banished to the Highlands and Islands, no longer functioned as a significant force in central Scotland.

In 1945, the SNP saw its first MP (Robert McIntyre) elected at the Motherwell by-election, but had little success during the following decade. The ILP members rejoined the Labour Party, and Scotland now had in effect a two-party system.

=== Devolution ===
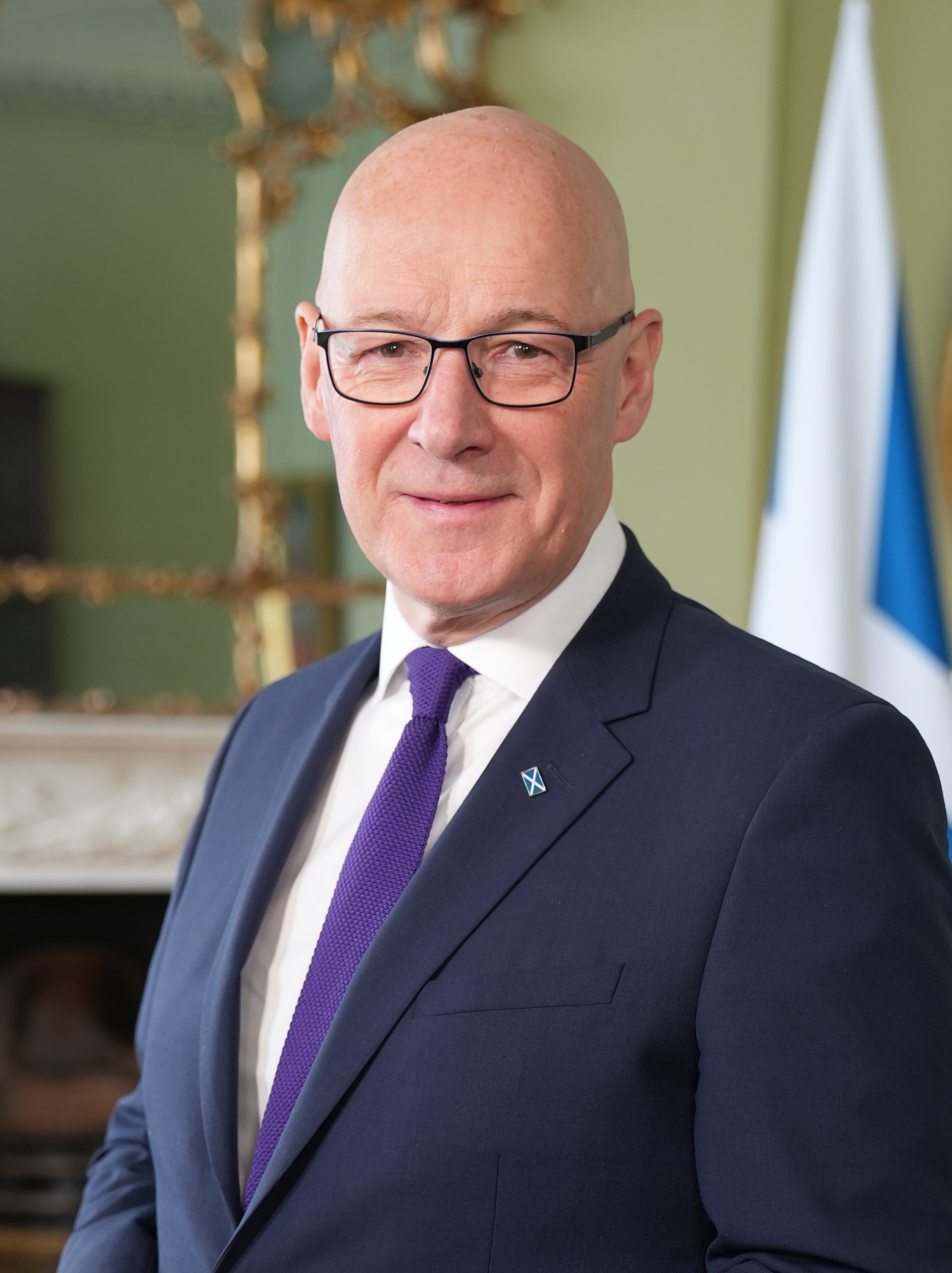
John Swinney, First Minister since May 2024

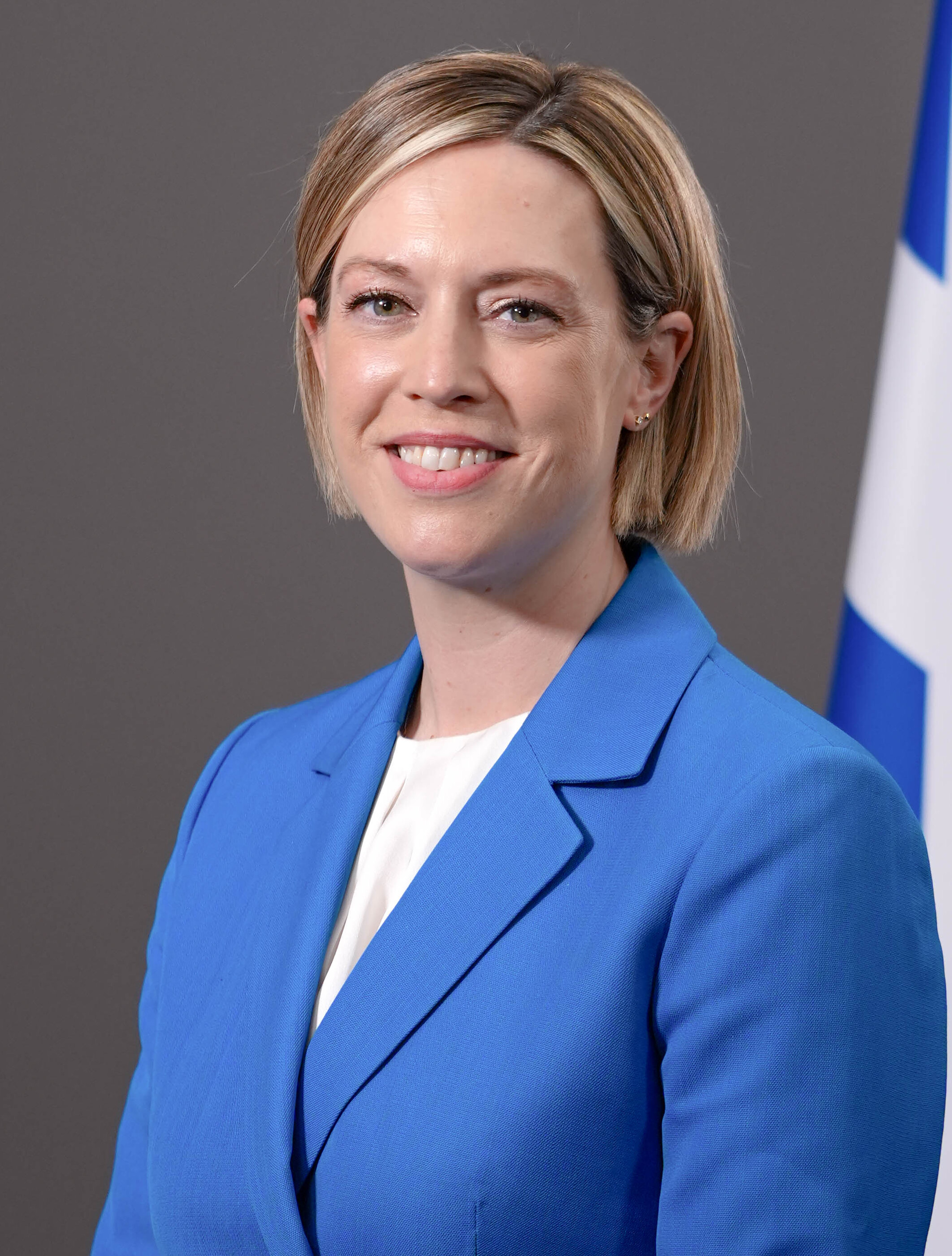
Jenny Gilruth, Deputy First Minister since May 2026

The First Minister is the head of the Scottish Government and is supported by the Deputy First Minister

Devolution refers to the process by which powers to legislate and govern are transferred from the UK Parliament in Westminster to a range of sub-UK level bodies, such as metro areas and the countries of the United Kingdom. Since the re–establishment of the Scottish Parliament, all matters have been devolved to that body by default, except those matters explicitly reserved to Westminster, and Westminster does not by convention legislate on devolved matters which are the responsibility of both the Scottish Parliament and Scottish Government, except by consent.

In Scotland, matters devolved to the Scottish Parliament exclusively include justice and law, police and prisons, local government, health, education, housing and student support, social welfare, the economy, food safety and standards, planning policy, economic development, agriculture and rural affairs, culture, tourism, the arts and sport. A number of other matters are shared such as some elements of transport (the Scottish Government is responsible for the majority of Scotland's transportation network), public pension and taxation. The Scottish Government receives a funding allocation from the UK Government, calculated under the Barnett Formula, but it does also have its own tax resources.

Subsequently, the Scotland Acts of 2012 and 2016 transferred powers over some taxation including Income Tax, Land and Buildings Transaction Tax, Landfill Tax, Aggregates Levy and Air Departure Tax, drink driving limits, Scottish Parliament and local authority elections, some social security powers, the Crown Estate of Scotland, some aspects of the benefits system, some aspects of the energy network in Scotland including renewable energy, energy efficiency and onshore oil and gas licensing, some aspects of equality legislation in Scotland and gaming machine licensing.

The programmes of legislation enacted by the Scottish Parliament have seen the divergence in the provision of public services compared to the rest of the United Kingdom. While the costs of a university education, and care services for the elderly are free at point of use in Scotland, fees are paid in the rest of the UK. Scotland was the first country in the UK to ban smoking in public places, with the ban effective from 26 March 2006. Also, on 19 October 2017, the Scottish government announced that smacking children as punishment was to be banned in Scotland, the first nation of the UK to do so.

In a further divergence from the rest of the United Kingdom from 1 January 2021 all Scottish legislation will be legally required to keep in regulatory alignment in devolved competences with future European Union law following the end of the Brexit transition period which ended on 31 December 2020 after the Scottish Parliament passed the UK Withdrawal from the European Union (Continuity) (Scotland) Act 2020 despite the United Kingdom no longer being an EU member state.

=== Future constitutional status ===
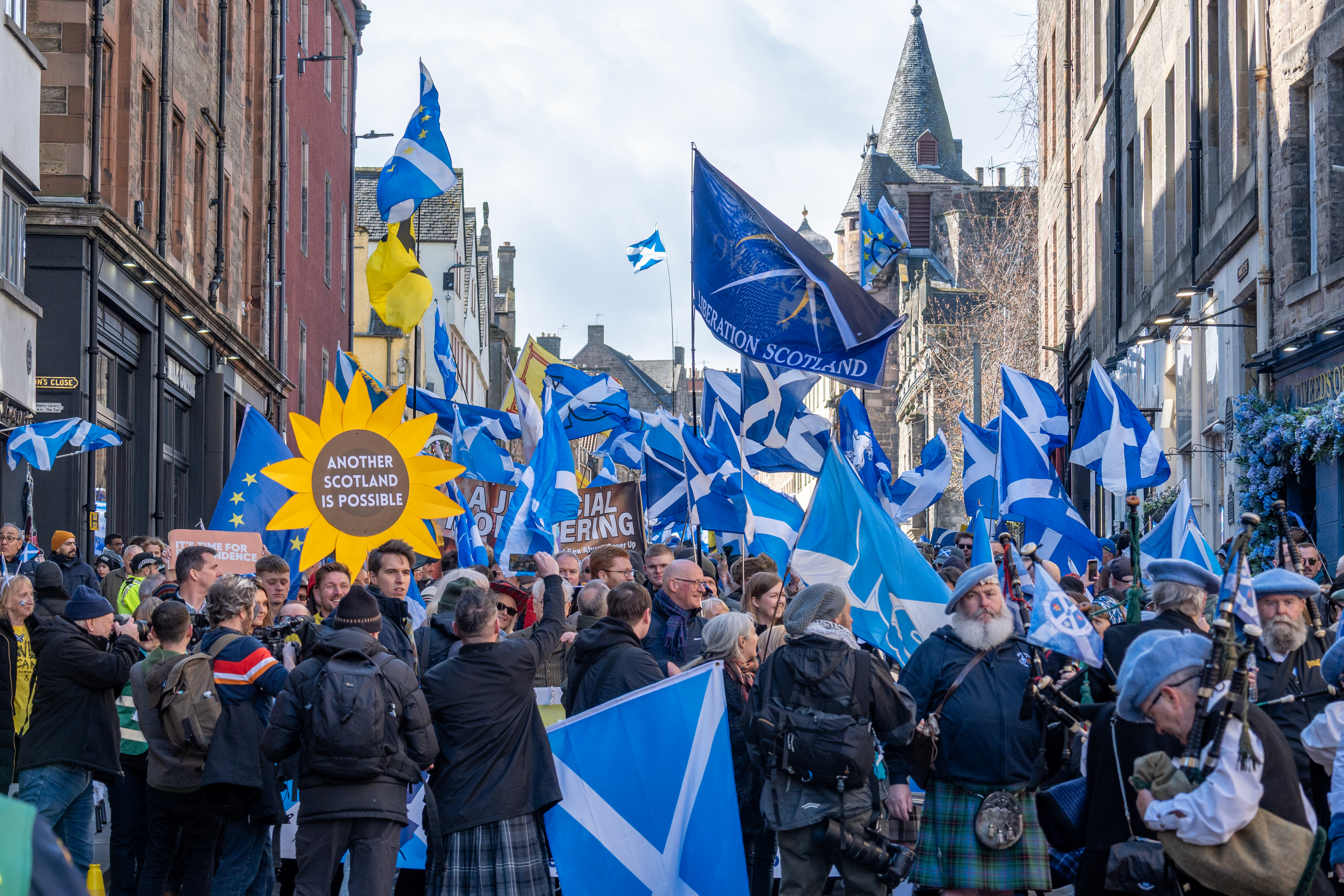
A pro-independence march in Scotland in 2026

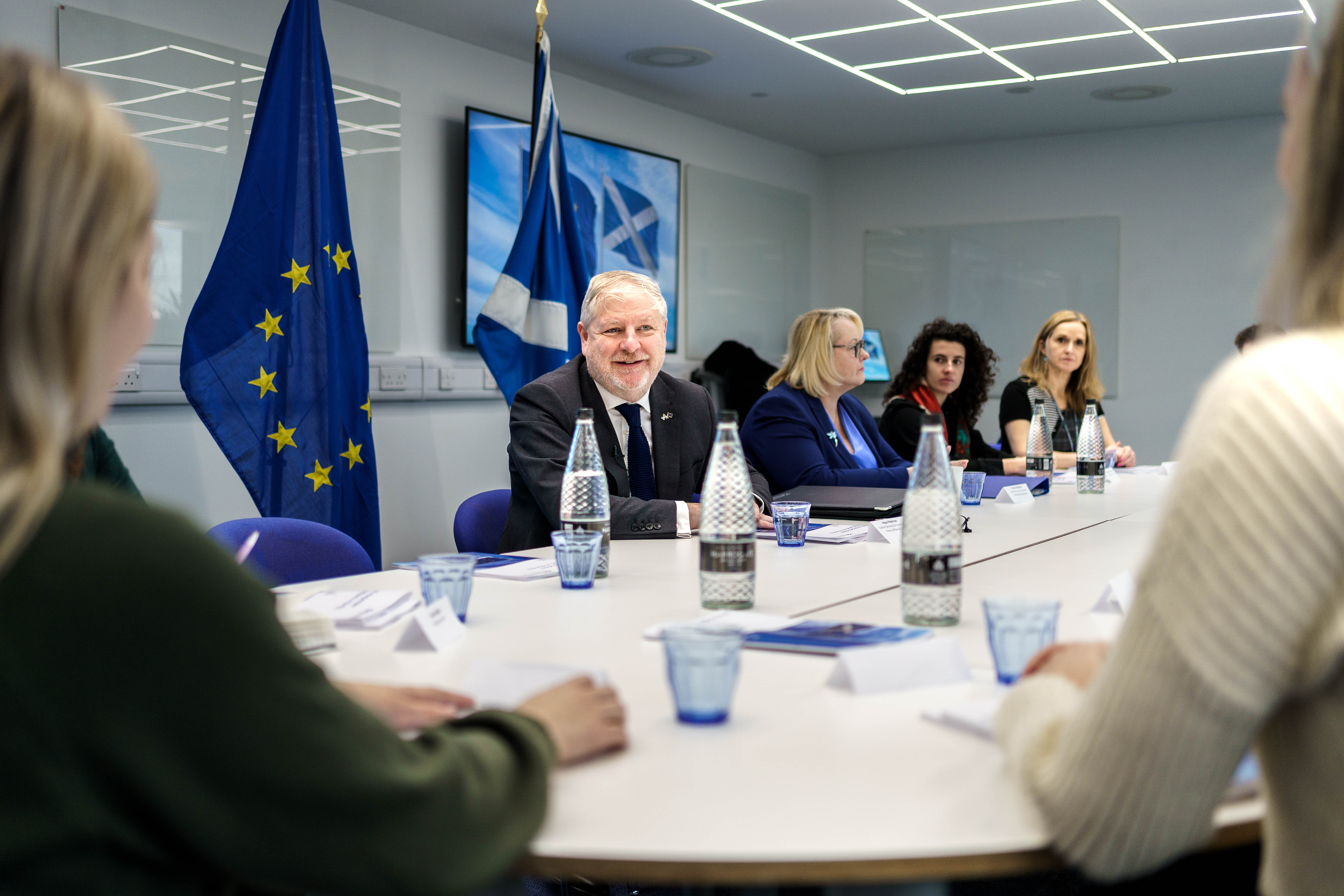
Cabinet Secretary for the Constitution, External Affairs and Culture Angus Robertson, at the launch of An independent Scotland in the EU, November 2023

A large debate in modern Scottish politics is over the constitutional status of Scotland. One common proposal is for the independence of Scotland from the UK; this would mean Scotland would once again become a sovereign state. There was an independence referendum in 2014 in which Scottish residents voted to remain within the United Kingdom, however this debate has been reignited due to the Brexit process, with the Scottish Government calling for a second independence referendum. This position is supported by the SNP and Scottish Greens, among other groupings. Independence advocates propose that independence would resolve a democratic deficit for Scottish voters and allow Scotland to rejoin the EU. Opponents argue that Scotland would be worse off economically after independence.

In 2022, the Scottish Government under First Minister of Scotland Nicola Sturgeon launched the first paper in a series of independence prospectuses entitled Building a New Scotland. The publication is a series of papers published by the Scottish Government that seeks to lay out a prospectus for Scottish independence. The Scottish Government had previously proposed holding an independence referendum on 19 October 2023. On 7 September 2021, Nicola Sturgeon stated that she would resume the case for independence and restart work on a prospects for independence. On 13 June 2022, Nicola Sturgeon published the first independence paper. On 14 July 2022, Nicola Sturgeon published the second independence paper. As of March 2024, a total of ten papers had been published.

Other proposals include more devolution for Scotland, supported by the SNP in lieu of full independence. Under the pressure of growing support for Scottish independence, a policy of devolution had been advocated by all three GB-wide parties to some degree during their history (although Labour and the Conservatives have also at times opposed it). This question dominated the Scottish political scene in the latter half of the twentieth century with Labour leader John Smith describing the revival of a Scottish parliament as the "settled will of the Scottish people".

=== Timeline of significant events ===
==== 1950s ====
- 1950: The Liberals won two seats – Jo Grimond winning Orkney and Shetland. The Liberals continue to hold Orkney and Shetland to the present day.
- 1951: Labour and the Unionists won 35 seats each, the Liberals losing one seat.
- 1955: The Unionists won a majority of both seats and votes. They have not won a majority of seats at a general election in Scotland since. The SNP came second in Perth and Kinross.
- 1959: In contrast to England, Scotland swung to Labour, which scored four gains at the expense of the Unionists and winning 38 out of 71 seats in Scotland. This marked the start of 56 years of political domination of Scottish seats in the UK Parliament by Labour. This also marked the start of a trend which in less than 40 years saw the Unionists' Scottish representation at Westminster reduced to zero. The election was the last occasion when the Unionists won the popular vote in Scotland: their merger with the Conservative Party of England and Wales in 1965, to become the Scottish Conservative and Unionist Party began a long, steady decline in their support.

==== 1960s ====
- 1964: There was a substantial swing to Labour, giving them 44 of Scotland's 71 seats. The Liberals won four seats, all in the Highlands.
- 1965: David Steel won the Roxburgh, Selkirk and Peebles by-election for the Liberals.
- 1966: Labour gained 2 more seats and the Liberals made a net gain of 1. The SNP garnered over 100,000 votes and finished second in 3 constituencies.
- 1967: The SNP did well in the Glasgow Pollok by-election. Nonetheless, the Conservative and Unionist candidate won. However, in the subsequent Hamilton by-election Winnie Ewing won a decisive victory.

==== 1970s ====
- 1970: The SNP performed poorly in local elections and in the Ayrshire South by-election. The general election saw a small swing to the Conservatives & Unionists, but Labour won a majority of seats in Scotland. The SNP made little progress in central Scotland, but took votes from the Liberals in the Highlands and in north east Scotland, and won the Western Isles.
- 1971–73: The SNP did well in by-elections, Margo MacDonald winning Glasgow Govan.
- 1974: In the two general elections of 1974 (in February and October) the SNP won 7 and then 11 seats, their share of the vote rising from 11% in 1970 to 22% and then 30%. With the Labour Party winning the October 1974 election by a narrow margin of 3 seats, the SNP appeared in a strong position.
- 1974–79: Devolution dominated this period: the Labour government attempted to steer through devolution legislation, based on the recommendations of the Kilbrandon Commission, against strong opposition, not least from its own backbenchers. Finally a referendum, whilst producing a small majority in favour of an elected Scottish Assembly, failed to achieve a turnout of 40% of the total electorate, a condition set in the legislation. At the 1979 general election, the SNP fared poorly, falling to 17% of the vote and 2 seats. Labour did well in Scotland, but in the United Kingdom as a whole Margaret Thatcher led the Conservatives to a decisive victory, where Labour would spend the next 18 years in opposition.
- 1979–83: The SNP suffered severe splits as the result of the drop in support in 1979. Labour also was riven by internal strife as the Social Democratic Party split away. Despite this, the 1983 general election still saw Labour remain the majority party in Scotland, with a smaller swing to the Conservatives than in England. The SNP's vote declined further, to 12%, although they won two seats.

==== 1980s and 1990s ====
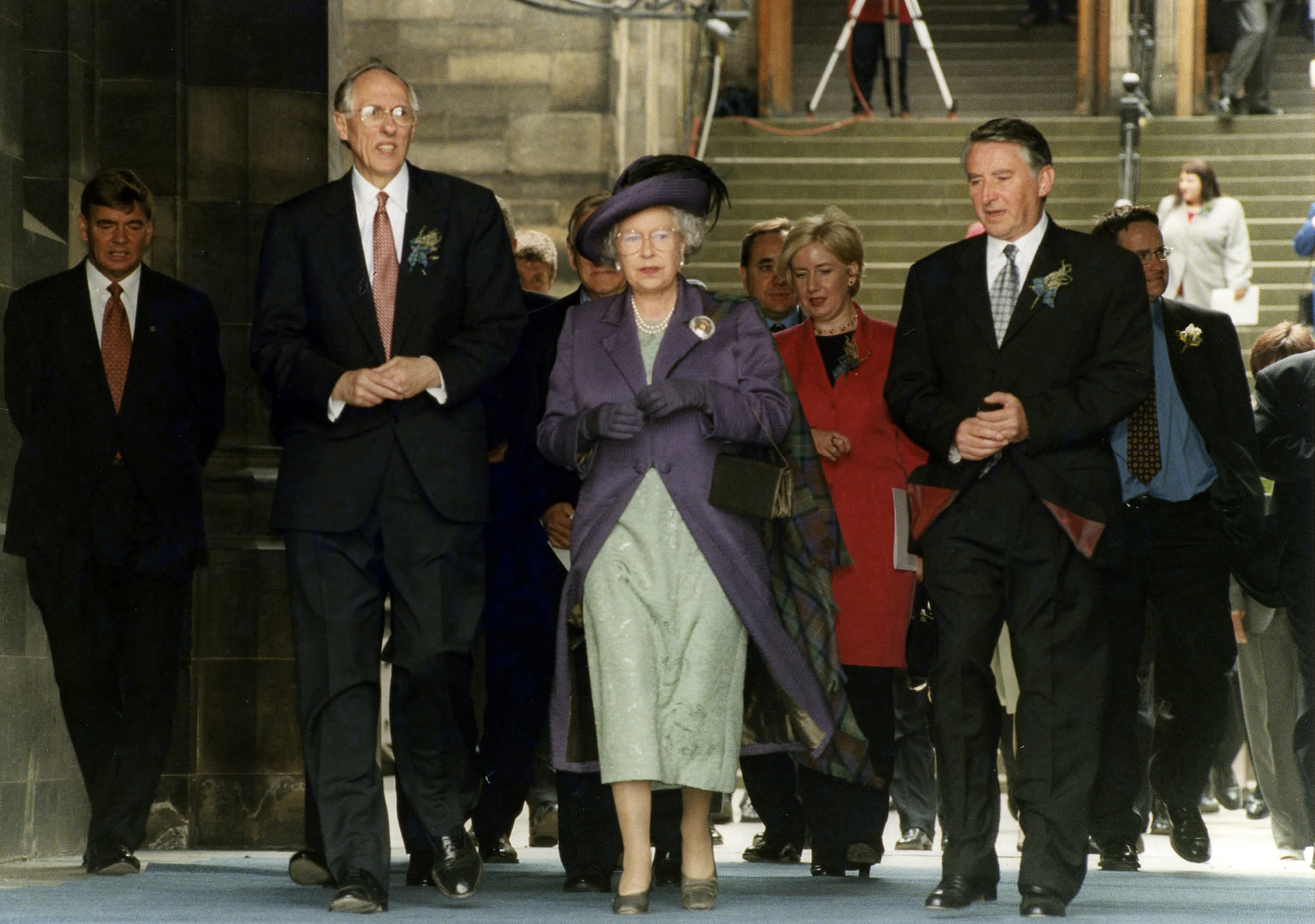
Dewar (left) with Queen Elizabeth II and Presiding Officer David Steel (right) at the opening of the Scottish Parliament, July 1999

- 1987: The Labour Party did well in the 1987 general election, mainly at the expense of the Conservatives & Unionists, who were reduced to their smallest number of Scottish seats since before World War I. The SNP made a small but significant advance.
- 1988: Jim Sillars wins the Glasgow Govan by-election for the SNP from Labour with 48.8% of the vote and a 3,554 lead over Labour.
- 1991: Nicol Stephen of the Liberal Democrats wins the 1991 Kincardine and Deeside by-election from the Conservatives, with 49.0% of the vote and a 7,824 lead over the Conservatives.
- 1992: This election proved a disappointment for Labour and the SNP in Scotland. The SNP went from 14% to 21% of the vote but won only 3 seats. The Conservative and Unionist vote did not collapse, as had been widely predicted, leading to claims that their resolutely anti-devolution stance had paid dividends.
- 1995: Roseanna Cunningham wins the 1995 Perth and Kinross by-election for the SNP from the Conservatives with 40.4% of the vote and a 7,311 vote lead over Labour.
- 1997: There was a Labour landslide in Scotland, whilst the SNP doubled their number of MPs to 6, but the Conservatives & Unionists failed to win a single seat. Unlike 1979, Scottish voters delivered a decisive "Yes" vote in the referendum on establishing a Scottish Parliament.
- 1999: The Scottish Parliament was established. Labour take 56 seats, SNP 35, Conservative 18, Liberal Democrats 17, and Greens and Socialists one each. A coalition of Labour and Liberal Democrats led by Donald Dewar of Scottish Labour, took power.

==== 2000s ====
- 2000: In October, Dewar died of a heart attack in office and was succeeded by Henry McLeish as Scottish First Minister.
- 2001: In November, McLeish stands down as First Minister following the Officegate financial scandal, and is succeeded by Jack McConnell.
- 2003: In the Scottish Parliament election, Labour take 50 seats, SNP 27, Conservative 18, Liberal Democrats 17, Greens 7, Socialists 6, Independents 3 and one from the Scottish Senior Citizens Unity Party. The Labour-Liberal Democrat coalition was maintained.
- 2006: Willie Rennie wins the 2006 Dunfermline and West Fife by-election for the Liberal Democrats from Labour with 35.8% of the vote and an 1,800 vote lead over Labour.
- 2007: The SNP became Scotland's largest party in the 2007 Scottish Parliament election and formed a minority government. Alex Salmond succeeds Jack McConnell as First Minister. The SNP had 47 seats, Labour 46, Conservatives 17, Liberal Democrats 16, Greens 2 and Socialists, independents and other parties lost all their seats.
- 2008: John Mason wins the Glasgow East by-election for the SNP from Labour with 43.1% of the vote and a 365-vote lead over Labour.
- 2009: Willie Bain wins the Glasgow North East by-election for Labour from the Speaker with 59.4% of the vote and an 8,111 lead over the SNP.

==== 2010s ====
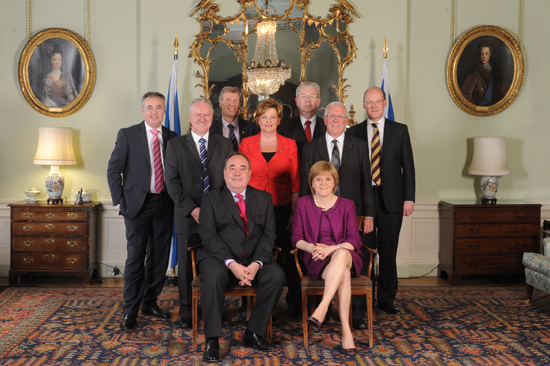
The Second Salmond government (2011–2014) was the first majority Scottish Government

- 2010: 2010 United Kingdom general election: Labour won 41 out of 59 Scottish seats and received over 1 million votes across Scotland, despite losing 91 seats across the UK as a whole.
- 2011: In the 2011 Scottish Parliament election, the SNP become the first party to win an overall majority in the Scottish Parliament. The SNP won 69 seats, with 65 needed for a majority. Labour got 37, Conservatives 15, Liberal Democrats 5 and Greens 2. The Scottish leaders of Labour, the Conservatives, and the Liberal Democrats all resigned over the results.

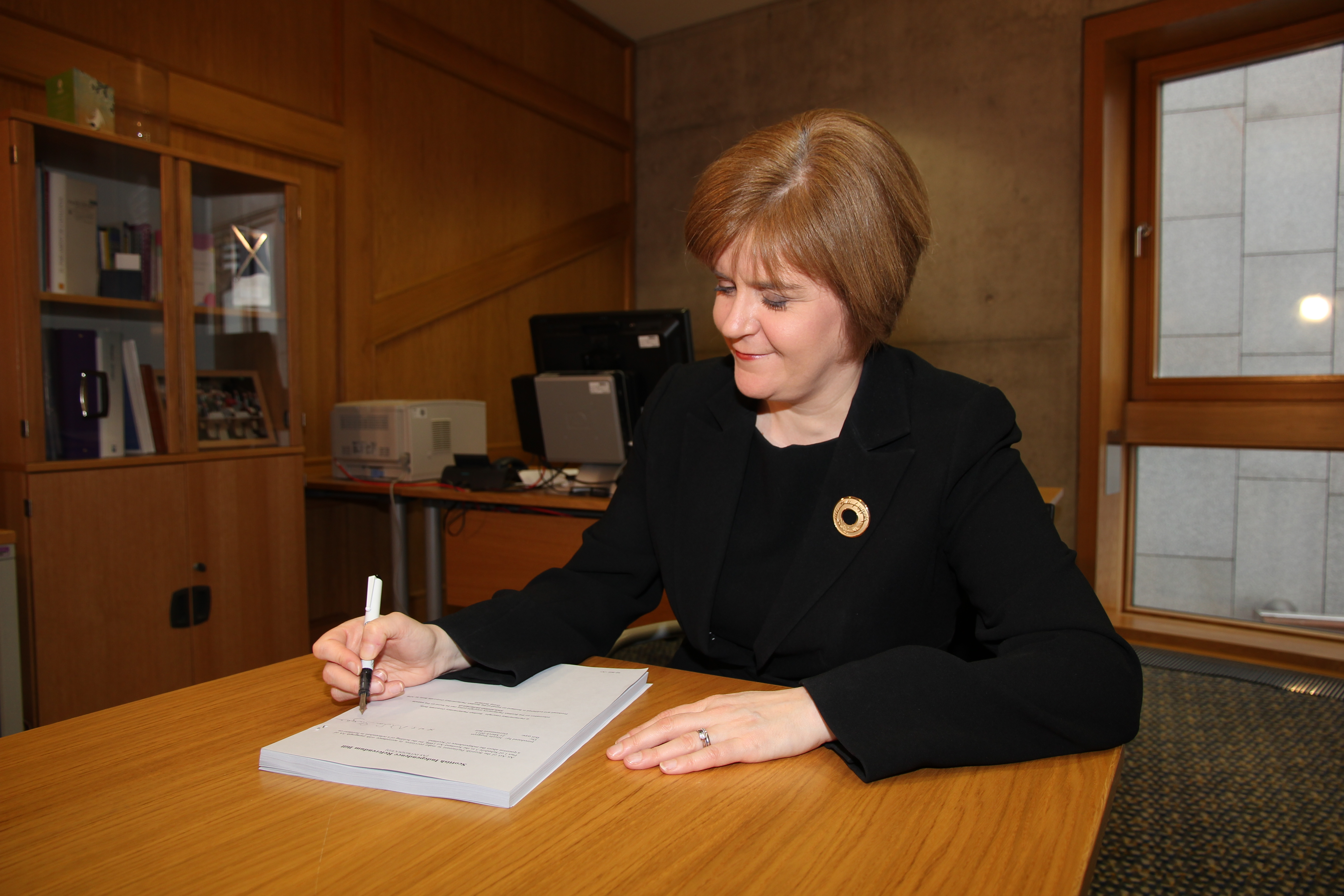
Deputy first minister Sturgeon signs the Scottish Independence Referendum Act 2013 allowing an independence referendum in 2014

- 2014: An independence referendum is held on whether Scotland should secede from the UK and become an independent country. Scotland votes to remain a part of the UK 55.3% to 44.7%. Alex Salmond resigns as First Minister, and is succeeded by Deputy First Minister, Nicola Sturgeon.
- 2015: At the general election, the SNP won 56 out of 59 Scottish seats, winning nearly exactly 50% of the popular vote. Labour, the Conservatives and the Liberal Democrats won just a single seat each.
- 2016: In May's 2016 Scottish Parliament election, the SNP lost their majority but remained the largest party and formed a minority government. The SNP got 63 seats, Conservatives 31, Labour 24, Greens 6 and Liberal Democrats 5. This was the first time Labour had finished third at any Scottish election since the 1918 general election.
- 2016: The UK votes to leave the European Union 51.9% to 48.1%, however 62% of Scottish voters backed remaining in the European Union.
- 2017: At the snap UK general election on 8 June, the SNP won 35 out of the 59 Scottish seats, the Conservatives won 13, Labour won 7 and the Liberal Democrats won 4 seats. This too was the first general election in 99 years where Labour finished in third place.
- 2019: At the 2019 UK general election, the SNP won 48 out of the 59 Scottish seats, the Conservatives won 6, the Liberal Democrats won 4 and Labour won a single seat. This was the worst result for Scottish Labour since the December 1910 general election, with Labour finishing in fourth place.

==== 2020s ====
- 2021: At the 2021 Scottish Parliament election the SNP won 64 seats, Conservatives 31, Labour 22, Greens 8 (a week later lowered to 7 due to Alison Johnstone becoming Holyrood's Presiding Officer, which requires one to give up their party affiliation), and the Liberal Democrats 4. The SNP signs a co-operation agreement with the Greens and the Liberal Democrat Leader Willie Rennie resigns.
- 2023: Michael Shanks wins the Rutherglen and Hamilton West by-election for Labour from the SNP with 58.6% of the vote and an 9,446 lead over the SNP.
- 2024: The Scottish Labour Party returns as the largest party representing Scottish constituencies at the House of Commons following the 2024 United Kingdom general election, winning 37 out of 57 seats. The Scottish National Party (SNP) fell to the second largest party by representation in the House of Commons, winning 9 Scottish seats whilst losing 39 seats.
- 2026: At the 2026 Scottish Parliament election the SNP won 58 seats (a week later lowered to 57 due to Kenneth Gibson becoming Holyrood's Presiding Officer, which requires one to give up their party affiliation), Labour and Reform UK tied on 17, Greens 15, Conservatives 12, and the Liberal Democrats 10. The SNP under First Minister John Swinney forms another minority government. Two months later Anas Sarwar resigns after his appointment to the House of Lords to become a Trade minister in the UK Labour government.

== Structure of politics ==
=== The Crown ===
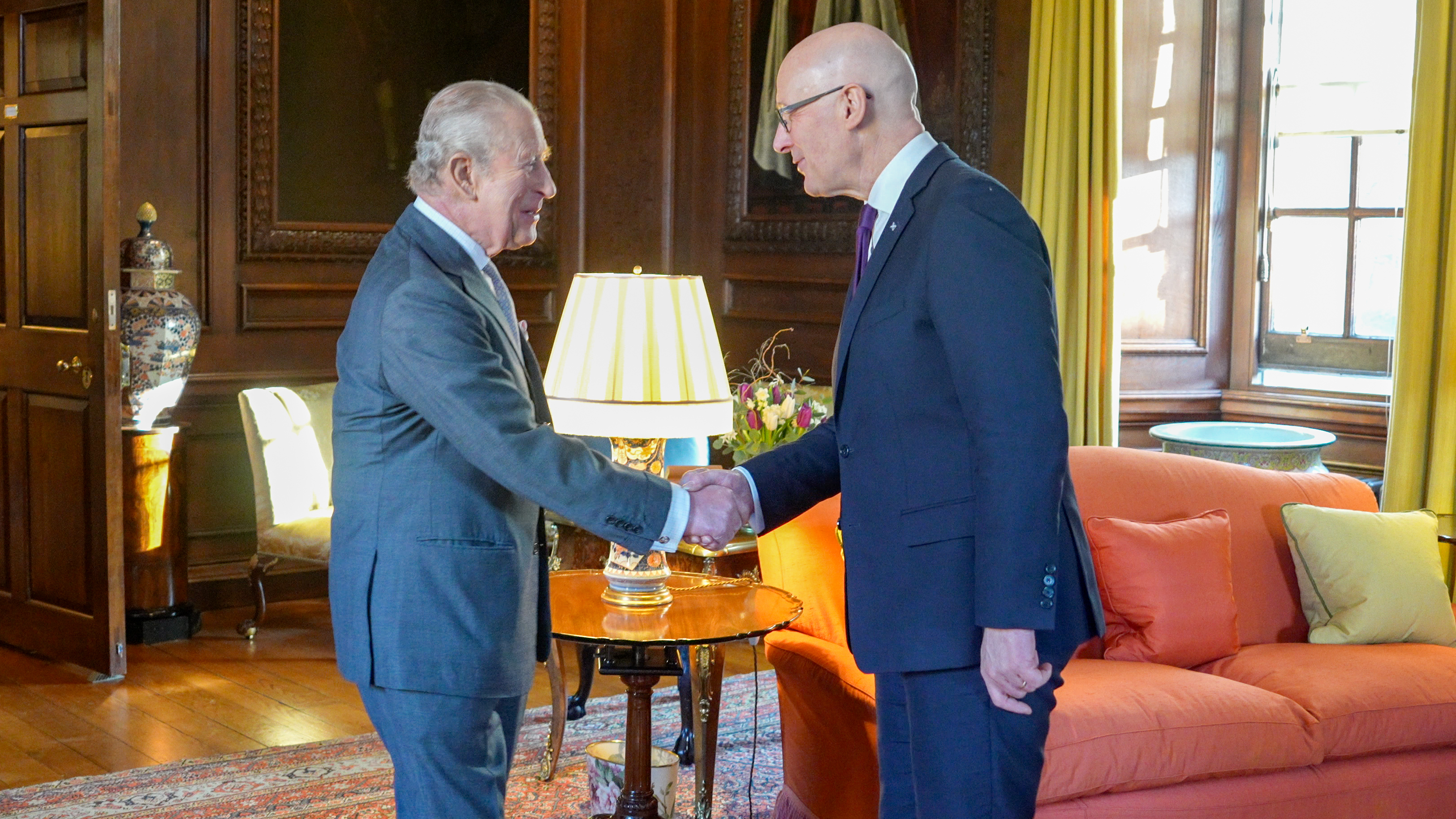
Monarch Charles III receives First Minister John Swinney at the Holyrood Palace, 2026

The version of the Royal Standard used in Scotland

Scotland is governed under the framework of a constitutional monarchy. The head of state in Scotland is the British monarch, currently King Charles III (since 2022). Until the early 17th century, Scotland and England were entirely separate kingdoms ruled by different royal families. However, on the death of Elizabeth I of England in 1603, the then-King of Scotland James VI became James I of England, in what is known as the Union of the Crowns. However, the two monarchies remained legally separate, albeit held by the same individual.

Scotland is no longer an independent, sovereign country, nor is it a kingdom in its own right. Under the Union with England Act 1707, the Kingdoms of Scotland and England have been united into "One Kingdom" (Great Britain, later the United Kingdom). A unification of Scotland and England had been debated since the Union of the Crowns, however was initially met with little enthusiasm by the administrations of both countries.

The Crown of Scotland is still used during the monarchs first visit to Scotland following their coronation ceremony and is also present at the state opening of the Scottish Parliament alongside the remaining Honours of Scotland which the monarch attends.

=== Legislature ===
There are two bodies with the power to legislate for Scotland: the Scottish Parliament and the UK Parliament. Until 1999, the UK Parliament was the source of all legislation across the whole of the UK. Since then, devolution has meant that Scotland, as well as Wales and Northern Ireland, have had independent legislatures which pass laws on devolved responsibilities. The Scottish Parliament has had the power to pass primary legislation since 1999, and passed 282 Acts between then and the end of 2018. The Scottish Parliament can legislate on anything that is not reserved to the UK Parliament. The UK Parliament retains the ability to legislate on any matter for any part of the UK, including in Scotland, however since 1999 the UK Parliament has followed a convention (the Sewel convention) that means it will not normally legislate on devolved matters without the Scottish Parliament's consent.

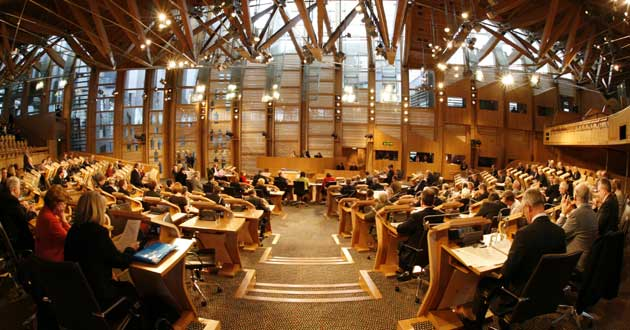
A session in process in the Scottish Parliament debating chamber with the parliaments 129 MSPs sitting

Opposition parties include the Scottish Labour (centre-left), Reform UK Scotland (right-wing to far-right), Scottish Greens (centre-left to left-wing, green), Scottish Conservatives (centre-right to right-wing, conservative), social democratic), and the Scottish Liberal Democrats (centre to centre-left, social liberal). The Scottish Socialist Party (left-wing, democratic socialist) won a seat in the first Scottish Parliament election in 1999 and increased their number of seats to 6 in the 2003 Scottish Parliament election, but then lost their seats in the 2007 election and haven't regained representation in the Scottish Parliament since. Elections were normally held once every four years from the inception of the Scottish Parliament in 1999 to 2016 (the election scheduled for 2015 was delayed for one year to 2016 after agreement by all of the main political parties). A Bill was passed by the Scottish Parliament on 25 February 2016 and received Royal Assent on 30 March 2016 increasing the term of the Parliament to five years. 73 Members are elected to represent constituencies, and the remaining 56 elected via a system of proportional representation. At Westminster, Scotland is represented by 37 MPs from the Labour Party, 9 from the Scottish National Party, six from the Liberal Democrats, and five from the Conservative Party, elected in the 2024 United Kingdom general election. The secretary of state for Scotland—currently Douglas Alexander MP, a member of Scottish Labour—is usually a member of the House of Commons representing a constituency in Scotland.

=== Scottish Government ===
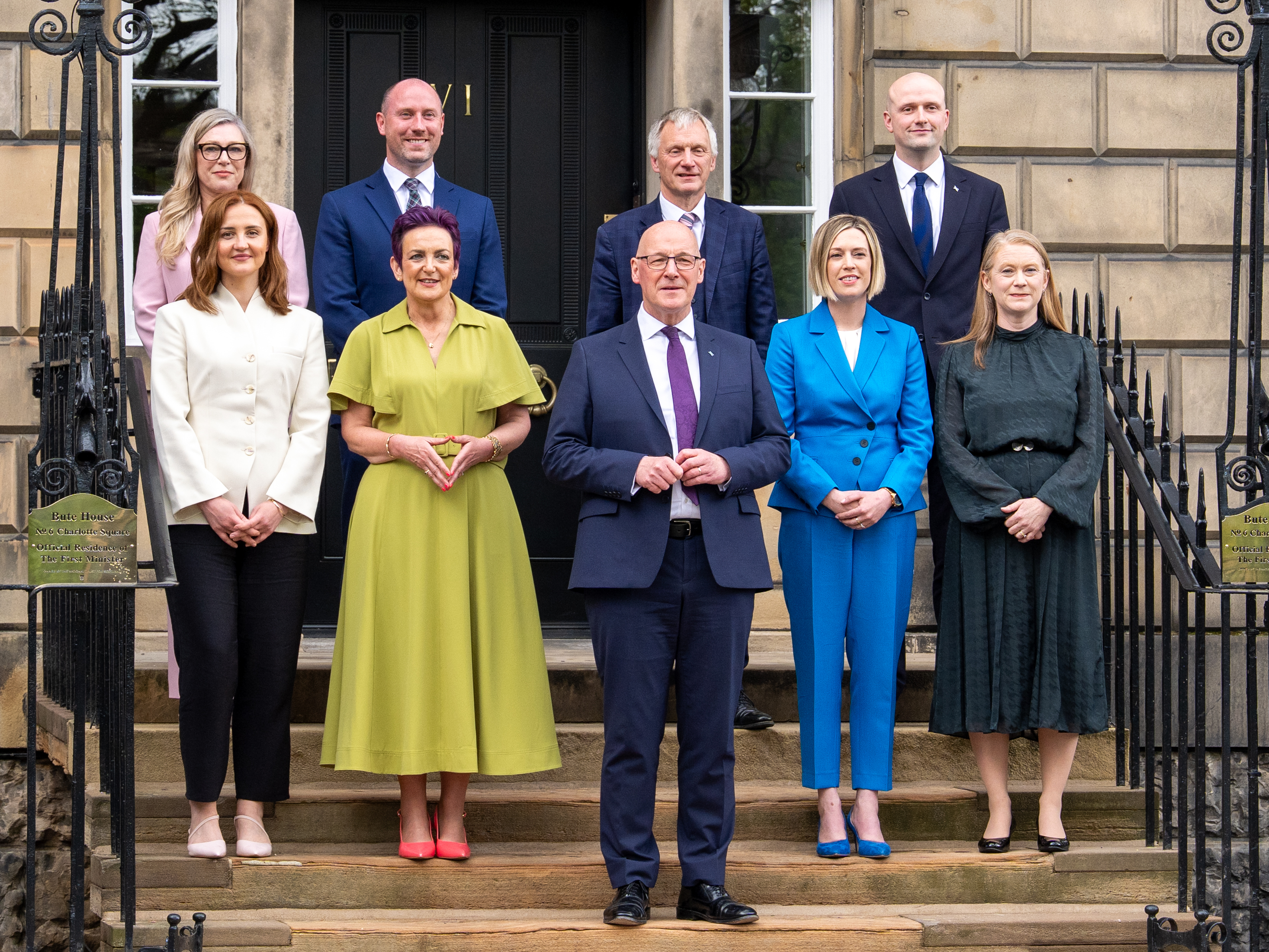
The incumbent Scottish cabinet, the Second Swinney government (May 2026–present)

Executive power in Scotland is exercised by the Sovereign (the Monarch). The Scottish Government is responsible for all devolved matters, including, but not limited to, education, transport, Scots law, Scottish Parliamentary and local government elections, health care, rural affairs, housing, the environment, taxation, the economy and local government, amongst other areas. The Government of the United Kingdom retains some limited powers of Scotland, as is responsible for reserved matters, such as deference, foreign policy and security.

The reigning monarch formally appoints the first minister according to a nomination by the Scottish Parliament. The first minister leads the Scottish Government and appoints members to and chairs meetings of the Scottish Cabinet, which consists of Cabinet Secretaries, Junior Ministers, and Law Officers. The Scottish Government governs through Scottish statutory instruments, a type of subordinate legislation, and is responsible for the Directorates of the Scottish Government, the executive agencies of the Scottish Government, and the other public bodies of the Scottish Government. The directorates include the Scottish Exchequer, the Economy Directorates, the Health and Social Care Directorates, and the Education, Communities and Justice Directorates. Elected in the 2026 Scottish Parliament election, the centre-left pro-independence Scottish National Party (SNP) is the party which forms the devolved government; it currently holds a plurality of seats in the parliament (58 out of 129).

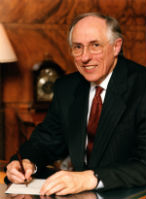
Donald Dewar, the inaugural first minister was first to lead a Scottish Government since the Treaty of Union in 1707

In August 2021, the SNP and the Scottish Greens agreed terms which would see the Scottish Greens enter into a power sharing agreement with the SNP, known as the Bute House Agreement. The agreement would see the Scottish Greens form part of the Scottish Government. The Agreement details the way in which the Scottish Government and the Green Group in Parliament will work together, the appointment of Green ministers, excluded policy areas from the Agreement, confidence and supply and dispute resolution. The agreement is accompanied by a shared policy programme, which sets out in detail where the two have decided to collaborate. On 31 August 2021, the SNP and Scottish Greens entered a power-sharing arrangement which resulted in the appointment of two Green MSPs as junior ministers in the government, delivery of a shared policy platform, and Green support for the government on votes of confidence and supply. There was no agreement on oil and gas exploration, but the government now argued that it had a stronger case for a national independence referendum. First Minister Humza Yousaf formally ended the Bute House Agreement on 25 April 2024, effectively removing the Scottish Greens from government. He claimed that the Bute House Agreement "had served its purpose" and would lead a minority Scottish Government. As a consequence, Yousaf faced a vote of no confidence in the Scottish Parliament, and resigned on 7 May 2024 amidst the resulting government crisis.

The first minister is conventionally the leader of the political party with the most support in the Scottish Parliament, currently John Swinney who was appointed in May 2024. Nicola Sturgeon, the previous first minister, led the government since November 2014. Before Sturgeon, Alex Salmond led the SNP to an overall majority victory in the May 2011 general election. The inaugural First Minister was Donald Dewar, the leader of Scottish Labour at the time, who was Secretary of State for Scotland at its time of establishment.

==== First Ministers ====
- Donald Dewar (1999–2000)
- Jim Wallace (Acting) (11 October 2000 – 27 October 2000)
- Henry McLeish (2000–2001)
- Jim Wallace (Acting) (8 November 2001 – 27 November 2001)
- Jack McConnell (2001–2007)
- Alex Salmond (2007–2014)
- Nicola Sturgeon (2014–2023)
- Humza Yousaf (2023–2024)
- John Swinney (2024–present)

==== Deputy First Ministers ====
- Jim Wallace (1999–2005)
- Nicol Stephen (2005–2007)
- Nicola Sturgeon (2007–2014)
- John Swinney (2014–2023)
- Shona Robison (2023–2024)
- Kate Forbes (2024–2026)
- Jenny Gilruth (2026–present)

=== International relations ===
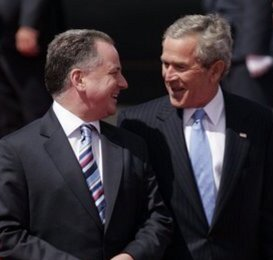
First Minister Jack McConnell with U.S. President, George W. Bush, 2005

Scottish international relations and foreign affairs conducted by the Scottish Government seek to promote Scotland and Scottish interests overseas by promoting its culture, education and research, economy and promote Scotland as a place for trade and business. As of 2023, Scotland has a total of nine Scottish Government offices, with plans on opening a further office in Warsaw by the end of the current parliamentary term.

Thirty international offices of the Scottish Government currently operate in twenty countries globally. Scottish offices in other countries act as a mechanism to promote collaboration and engagement between the Scottish Government and other international governments. The country has eight Scottish Government international offices, and over thirty Scottish Development International offices globally, with seven Scottish Government offices based in British embassies or British High Commission offices.

Scotland has a network of eight international offices across the world. These are located in:

- Beijing, China (Scottish Government Beijing Office) (British Embassy)
- Berlin, Germany (Scottish Government Berlin Office)
- Brussels, Belgium (Scotland House Brussels)
- Copenhagen, Denmark (Scottish Government Copenhagen Office)
- Dublin, Ireland (Scottish Government Dublin Office) (British Embassy)
- Ottawa, Canada (Scottish Government Ottawa Office) (British High Commission)
- Paris, France (Scottish Government Office) (British Embassy)
- Washington, D.C., United States (Scottish Government Washington, D.C. Office) (British Embassy)

The Scottish Government also maintains Scotland House London, as a permanent office in London.

== Scottish Parliament ==
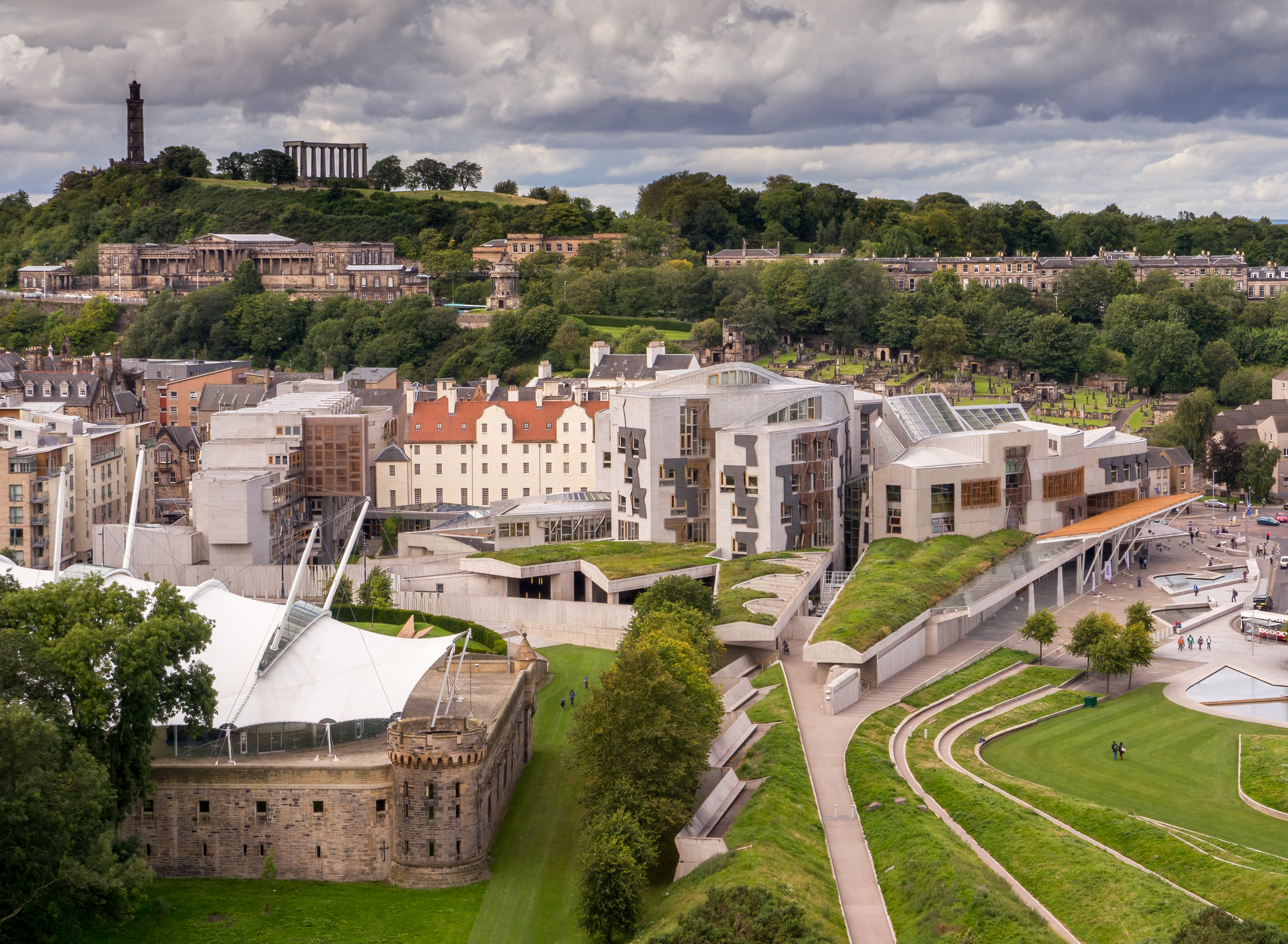
The Scottish Parliament Building is situated in Scotland's capital city, Edinburgh

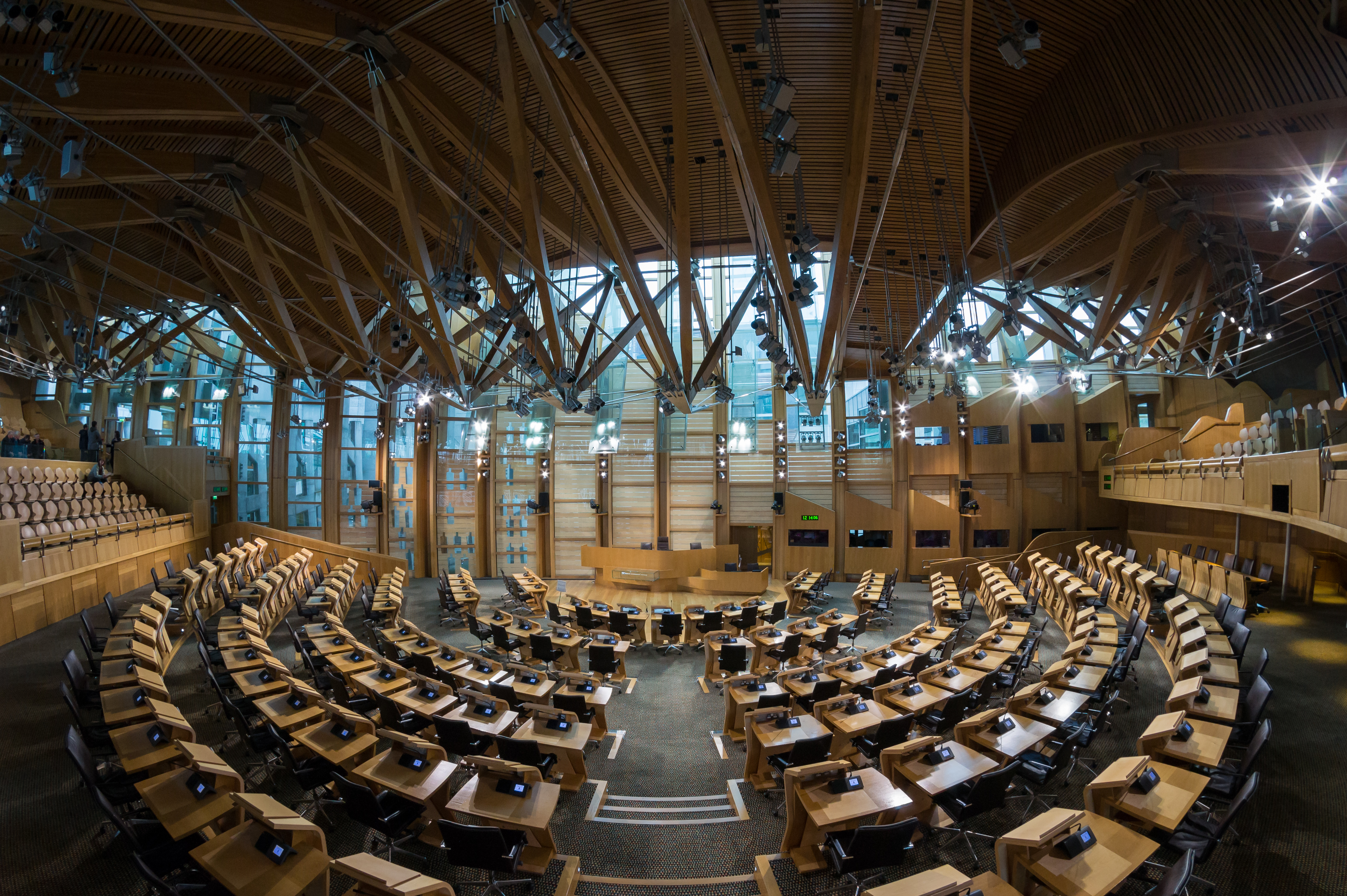
The debating chamber of the Scottish Parliament

The Scottish Parliament is the national, unicameral legislature of Scotland. The election of a Labour government in the 1997 general election was followed by the Referendums (Scotland and Wales) Act 1997, which legislated for the 1997 Scottish devolution referendum, a referendum on establishing a devolved Scottish Parliament. 74.3% of voters agreed with the establishment of the Parliament and 63.5% agreed it should have tax-varying powers, which meant that it could adjust income taxes by up to 3%. The Parliament was then established by the Scotland Act 1998.

The Scottish Parliament sits in the Scottish Parliament Building at Holyrood in Edinburgh, giving it the informal name "Holyrood". In the Scottish Parliament, the inhabitants of Scotland are represented by 129 members of the Scottish Parliament (MSPs), who are elected by the additional member system, a form of proportional representation, by the Scottish Parliament constituencies and electoral regions. Thus the Parliament is unlike the UK Parliament, which is elected solely by the first past the post method. Of the 129 MSPs, 73 are elected to represent first past the post constituencies, whilst the remaining 56 are elected by the additional member system from eight regional lists. In the present parliament, elected in the 2021 Scottish Parliament elections, all MSPs are members of a political party and no independents.

It enacts primary legislation through Acts of the Scottish Parliament, but cannot legislate on reserved matters, as set out by the Scotland Act 1998 and amended by the Scotland Act 2012 and the Scotland Act 2016; these include defence, international relations, fiscal and economic policy, drugs law and broadcasting. Anything not mentioned as a specific reserved matter is automatically devolved to Scotland, including health, education, local government, Scots law and all other issues. This is one of the key differences between the successful Scotland Act 1998 and the failed Scotland Act 1978.

=== Presiding Officer ===
The Presiding Officer of the Scottish Parliament is the speaker of the parliament and the ex officio head of the Scottish Parliamentary Corporate Body. The Presiding Officers of the Scottish Parliament have been:

- David Steel (1999–2003)
- George Reid (2003–2007)
- Alex Fergusson (2007–2011)
- Tricia Marwick (2011–2016)
- Ken Macintosh (2016–2021)
- Alison Johnstone (2021–2026)
- Kenneth Gibson (2026–present)

== Scots Law and Judiciary ==
The Courts of Scotland administer justice in Scots law, the legal system in Scotland. The Lord Advocate is the chief legal officer of the Scottish Government and the Crown in Scotland for both civil and criminal matters for which Scottish Parliament has devolved responsibilities. The Lord Advocate is the chief public prosecutor for Scotland and all prosecutions on indictment are conducted by the Crown Office and Procurator Fiscal Service, nominally in the Lord Advocate's name.

The Lord Advocate's deputy, the Solicitor General for Scotland, advises the Scottish Government on legal matters. The Advocate General for Scotland advises the British Government, and leads the Office of the Advocate General for Scotland, a British government department. The High Court of Justiciary is the superior criminal court of Scotland. The Court of Session is the highest civil court and is both a court of first instance and a court of appeal. For judicial purposes, Scotland has been divided into six sheriffdoms with sheriff courts since the reform of the Local Government (Scotland) Act 1973. Appeals from the Court of Session are made to the Supreme Court of the United Kingdom, which is also the final authority for constitutional affairs.

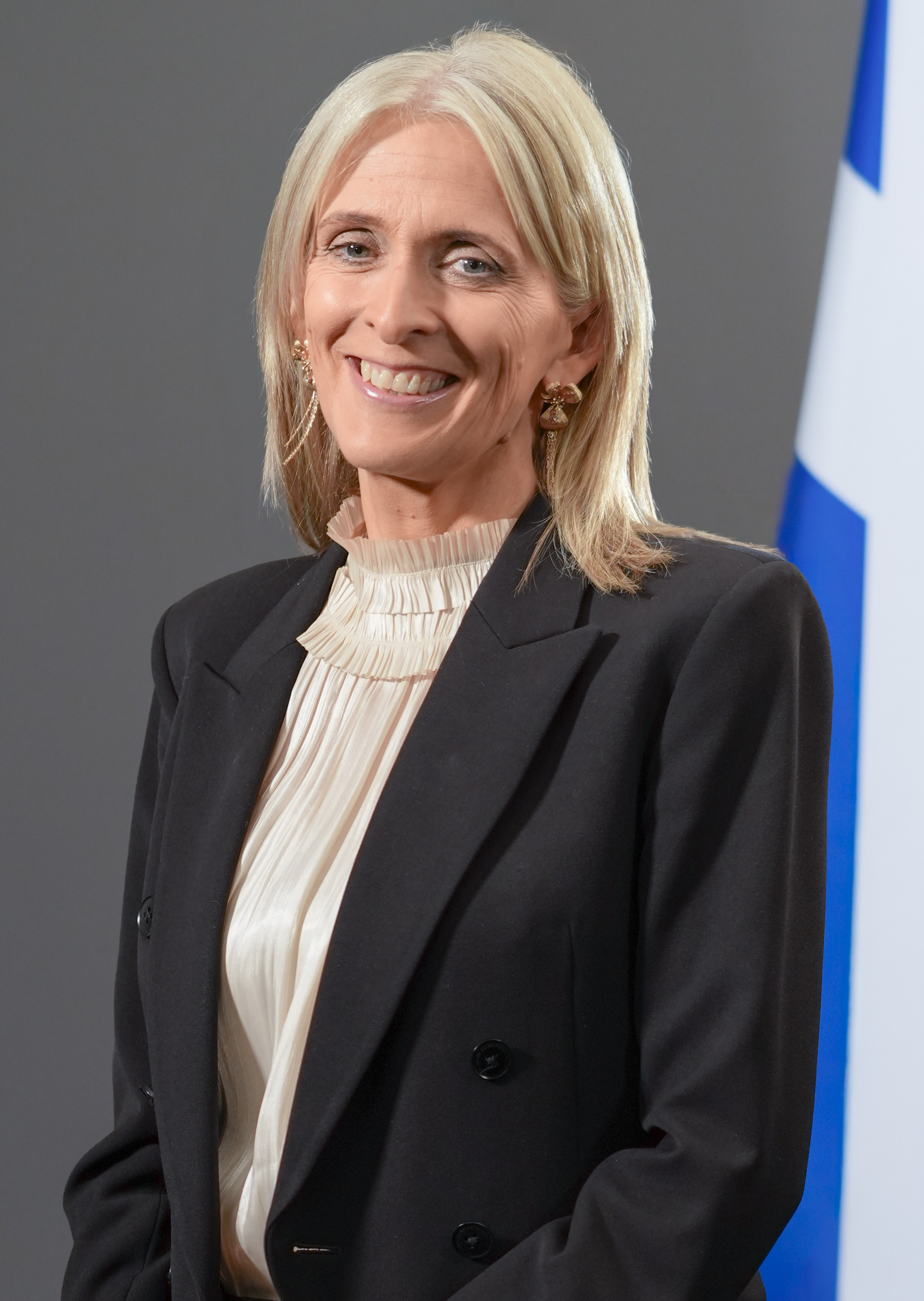
Ruth Charteris KC
Lord Advocate

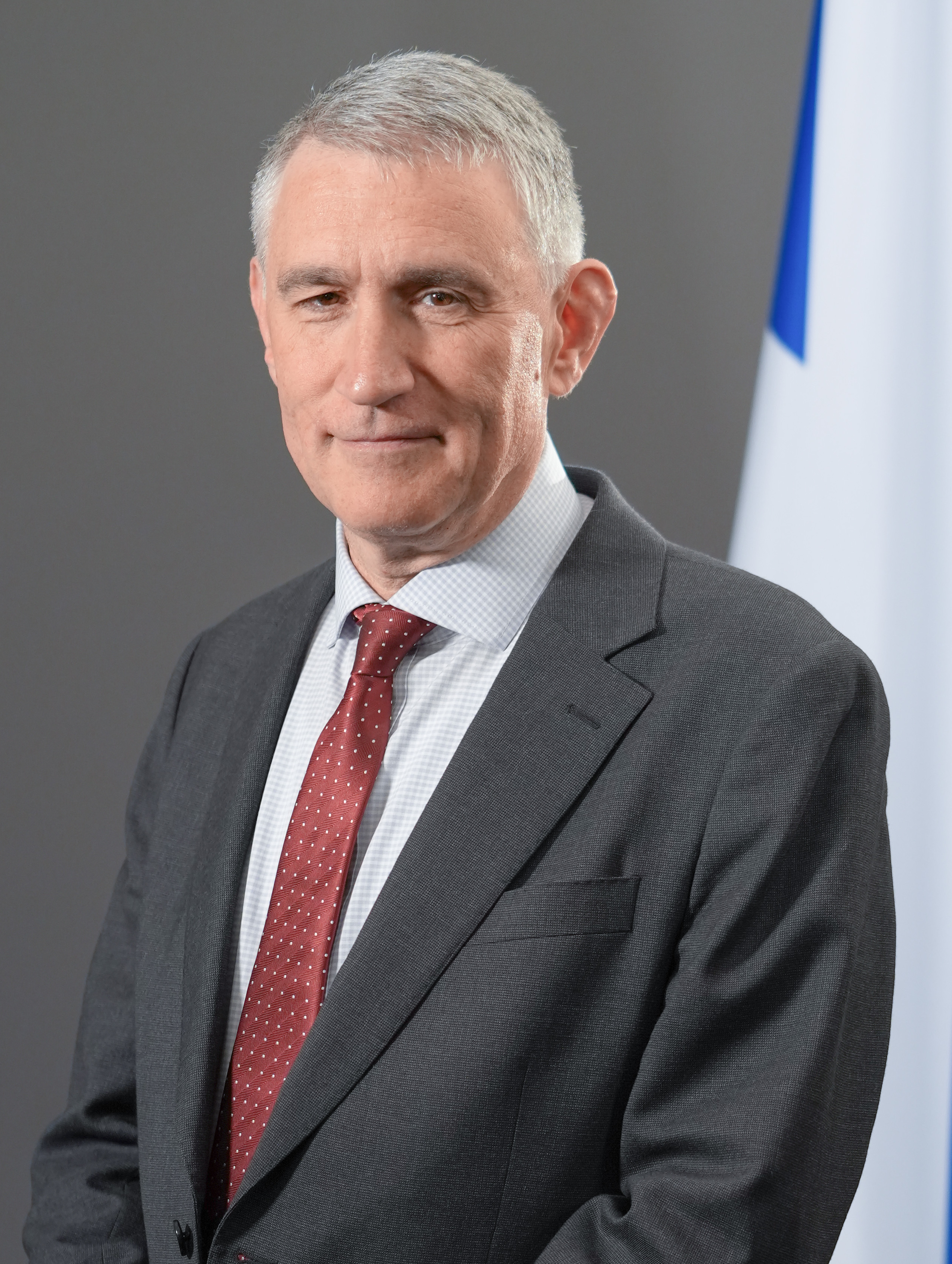
B. J. Gill KC
Solicitor General for Scotland

== Scotland in the United Kingdom ==
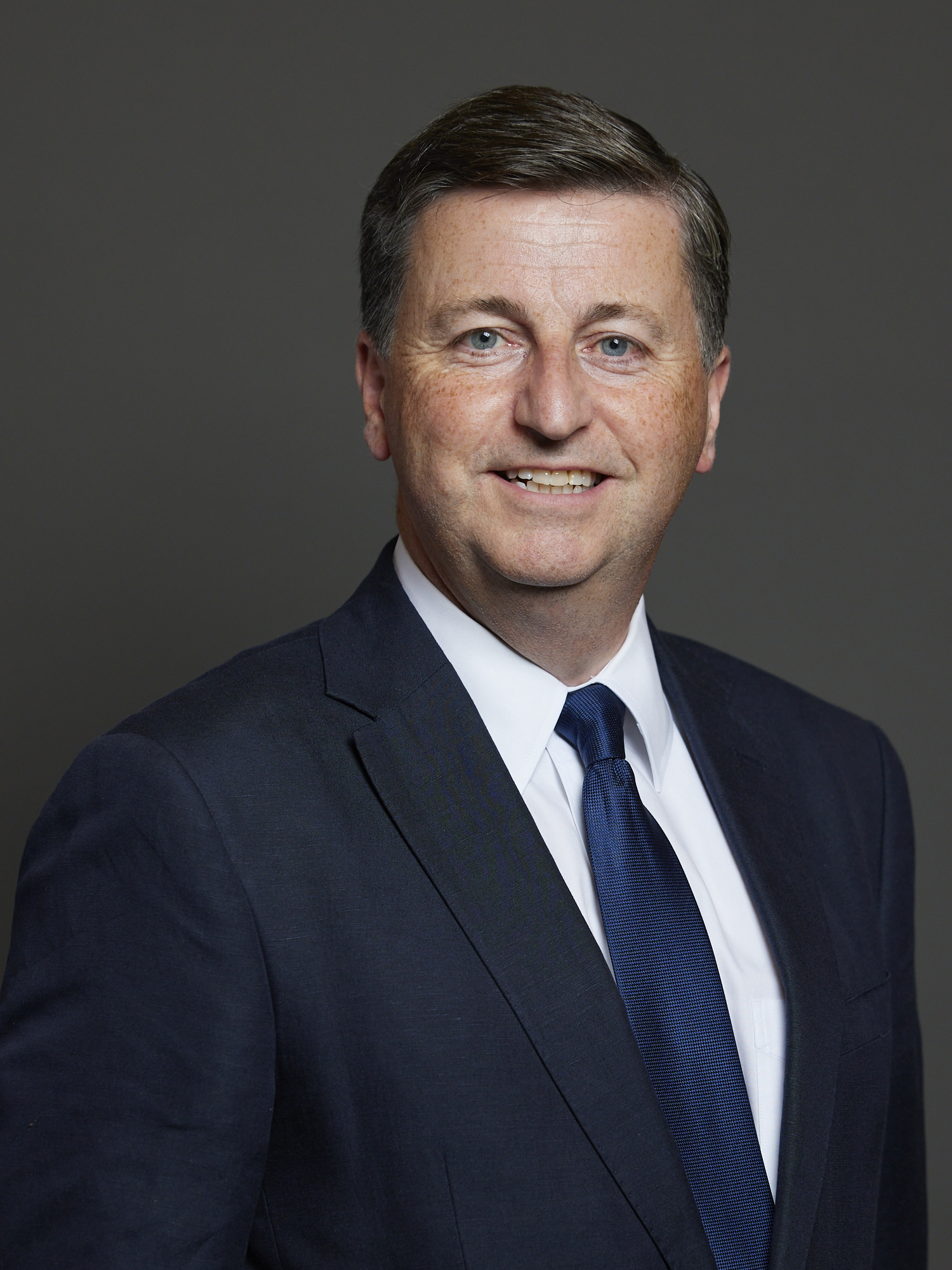
Douglas Alexander, the incumbent Secretary of State for Scotland within the UK Government

=== Secretary of State for Scotland ===
Scotland is one of the four countries of the United Kingdom. Scottish reserved affairs (powers not controlled by the Scottish Parliament and Scottish Government) are managed by the Secretary of State for Scotland, a role which aims to "promote the best interests of Scotland within a stronger United Kingdom" and represent Scottish interests within the UK government. However, the secretary of state is normally appointed by the UK Government and is from the government parties, not necessarily from the major party in Scotland. The current secretary of state for Scotland is Douglas Alexander who was appointed to the role in September 2025.

Statutory instruments made by the UK Government – within which the secretary of state for Scotland is a member of the Cabinet of the United Kingdom – may also apply to the whole of Great Britain. The secretary of state for Scotland is appointed by the prime minister of the United Kingdom. The secretary of state, who prior to devolution headed the system of government in Scotland, sits in the Cabinet of the United Kingdom and is responsible for the limited number of powers the office retains since devolution, as well as relations with other Whitehall Ministers who have power over reserved matters.

The Scotland Office is a department of the Government of the United Kingdom, responsible for reserved Scottish affairs. The Scotland Office, created in 1999, liaises with other Whitehall departments about reserved matters. Before devolution and the Scotland Office, much of the role of the devolved Scottish Government was undertaken by the Scottish Office, the previous British ministerial department led by Scottish Secretary.

=== Parliament of the United Kingdom ===
Scotland is represented by 57 MPs in the House of Commons of the United Kingdom elected from territory-based Scottish constituencies, out of a total of 650 MPs in the House of Commons. Various members of the House of Lords represent Scottish political parties.

The co-existence of devolution for Scotland and its continued representation in the UK Parliament, which retains full powers over matters relating to England, raised a debate known as the West Lothian question. This questions whether Scottish (and other devolved nation) representatives should continue to have a vote on affairs that do not relate directly to Scotland. This issue was exemplified in the raise in tuition fees in England in 2004. If non-English MPs, who were mostly government MPs, had not been able to vote, then the tuition fee rise would not have been able to occur, due to a rebellion on the government benches. This led to the creation in 2015 of the English votes for English laws (EVEL) process, in which Scottish MPs were not included in parts of the lawmaking process for laws that did not apply in Scotland. EVEL was abolished 2021.

==== Scottish representation in the Commons ====
General election results in Scotland (1918–Present)
Year	Scottish Conservatives (Note: 1918: Includes Coalition Conservative 1931–1935: Includes National government parties 1945: Includes National Liberal Party and National Independents 1945–1970: Includes National Liberal and Conservative candidates)		Scottish Labour		Scottish National		Scottish Liberal Democrats (Note: 1918–1979: Liberal Party 1918: Includes Coalition Liberals 1922: Includes National Liberal Party 1931: Includes Independent Liberals 1983–1987: SDP–Liberal Alliance 1992–Present: Liberal Democrats)	
Year	Seats	Votes	Seats	Votes	Seats	Votes	Seats	Votes
2024	5	12.7%	37	35.3%	9	30.0%	6	9.7%
2019	6	25.1%	1	18.6%	48	45.0%	4	9.5%
2017	13	28.6%	7	27.1%	35	36.9%	4	6.8%
2015	1	14.9%	1	24.3%	56	50.0%	1	7.5%
2010	1	16.7%	41	42.0%	6	19.9%	11	18.9%
2005	1	15.8%	41	39.5%	6	17.7%	11	22.6%
2001	1	15.6%	56	43.9%	5	20.1%	10	16.4%
1997	0	17.5%	56	41.0%	6	22.0%	10	13.0%
1992	11	25.7%	49	34.4%	3	21.5%	9	13.1%
1987	10	24.0%	50	38.7%	3	14.0%	9	19.3%
1983	21	28.4%	40	33.2%	2	11.8%	8	24.5%
1979	22	31.4%	44	38.6%	2	17.3%	3	9.0%
Oct 1974	16	24.7%	41	33.1%	11	30.4%	3	8.3%
Feb 1974	21	32.9%	40	34.6%	7	21.9%	3	7.9%
1970	23	38.0%	44	44.5%	1	11.4%	3	5.5%
1966	20	37.6%	46	47.7%	0	5.0%	5	6.7%
1964	24	37.3%	43	46.9%	0	2.4%	4	7.6%
1959	31	47.3%	38	46.7%	0	0.8%	1	4.8%
1955	36	50.1%	34	46.7%	0	0.5%	1	1.9%
1951	35	48.6%	35	48.0%	0	0.3%	1	2.8%
1945	27	40.3%	37	47.9%	0	1.3%	0	5.6%
1935	43	49.8%	20	36.8%	0	1.1%	3	6.7%
1931	57	55.4%	7	32.6%	0	1.0%	7	8.6%
1929	20	35.9%	36	42.3%	0	0.2%	13	18.1%
1924	36	40.7%	26	41.1%	–	–	8	16.6%
1923	14	31.6%	34	35.9%	–	–	22	28.4%
1922	13	25.1%	29	32.2%	–	–	27	39.2%
1918	30	32.8%	6	22.9%	–	–	33	34.1%

The effect of the Boundary Commission for Scotland's reform and the 2005 general election upon Scottish seats

For UK general elections, Scotland is divided into 57 constituencies of broadly equal population by the Scottish Boundary Commission. Each constituency elects a single Member of Parliament (MP), who represents the constituency in the House of Commons alongside representatives from the other countries of the UK. There are 650 MPs in total. The leader of the party or coalition that makes a majority or plurality in the Commons is typically invited by the reigning monarch to become the prime minister and to form a government.

Since 1945, Scottish seats have altered the final result of a general election four times. Without Scottish seats: in 1964, the Conservatives would have been the largest party rather than Labour; in February 1974, the Conservatives would have been the largest party but without a majority rather than Labour; in October 1974, Labour would no longer have won its majority and in 2010, the Conservatives would have won an outright majority and would not have needed to form a coalition with the Liberal Democrats.

Until the 2005 general election, Scotland elected 72 MPs from 72 single-member constituencies to serve in the House of Commons. As this over-represented Scotland in comparison to the other parts of the UK, Section 86 of the Scotland Act 1998 equalised the English and Scottish electoral quota. As a result, the Boundary Commission for Scotland's recommendations were adopted, reducing Scottish representation in the House of Commons to 59 MPs with effect from the 2005 general election. The necessary amendment to the Scotland Act 1998, was passed by the Parliament of the United Kingdom as the Scottish Parliament (Constituencies) Act 2004.

As of the 2024, the current representation of Scottish seats in the Commons, according to party allegiance, is:

- Scottish Labour: 37
- Scottish National Party: 9
- Scottish Liberal Democrats: 6
- Scottish Conservatives: 5

===== Historic representation =====
- List of MPs for constituencies in Scotland (1955–1959)
- List of MPs for constituencies in Scotland (1959–1964)
- List of MPs for constituencies in Scotland (1964–1966)
- List of MPs for constituencies in Scotland (1966–1970)
- List of MPs for constituencies in Scotland (1970–February 1974)
- List of MPs for constituencies in Scotland (February 1974–October 1974)
- List of MPs for constituencies in Scotland (October 1974–1979)

==== Scottish Lords ====
In 2015, twelve of the 92 hereditary peers with seats in the House of Lords to which they are elected (from among themselves) under the House of Lords Act 1999 were registered as living in Scotland, as were 49 life peers appointed under the Life Peerages Act 1958, including five former Lord Advocate. James Thorne Erskine, 14th Earl of Mar and 16th Earl of Kellie, retired in 2017 having lost his seat as a hereditary peer in 1999 but regained it in 2000 as a life peer; Charles Lyell, 3rd Baron Lyell (former Under-Secretary of State for Northern Ireland) died the same year. One of the former Lords Advocate, Kenneth Cameron, Baron Cameron of Lochbroom, retired from the Lords in 2016, while another, Donald Mackay, Baron Mackay of Drumadoon died in 2018. Besides these 61 peers listed in 2015 are hereditary members of the Lords living outwith Scotland, but who have titles in the Peerage of Scotland, such as Margaret of Mar, 31st Countess of Mar, or Scottish titles in the peerages of Great Britain or of the United Kingdom. Apart from these, there are also Scottish life peers with titles associated with places outside Scotland, such as Michelle Mone, Baroness Mone of Mayfair.

Political appointees include:

- Keith Stewart, Baron Stewart of Dirleton (Advocate General for Scotland)
- Jack McConnell, Baron McConnell of Glenscorrodale (former first minister)
- Nicol Stephen, Baron Stephen (former deputy first minister)
- Jim Wallace, Baron Wallace of Tankerness (former deputy first minister, and Advocate General for Scotland)
- Alistair Darling, Baron Darling of Roulanish (former chancellor of the exchequer and Secretary of State for Scotland)
- John Reid, Baron Reid of Cardowan (former home secretary and Secretary of State for Scotland)
- Michael Forsyth, Baron Forsyth of Drumlean (chair of the Economic Affairs Committee, former secretary of state for Scotland)
- Helen Liddell, Baroness Liddell of Coatdyke (former secretary of state for Scotland)
- Andrew Dunlop, Baron Dunlop (former under-secretary of state for Scotland)
- Lynda Clark, Baroness Clark of Calton (former advocate general for Scotland and member of the House of Commons)
- Neil Davidson, Baron Davidson of Glen Clova (former advocate general for Scotland)
- Keith Stewart, Baron Stewart of Dirleton (former advocate general for Scotland)
- Menzies Campbell, Baron Campbell of Pittenweem (former leader of the Liberal Democrats)
- Malcolm Bruce, Baron Bruce of Bennachie (former leader of the Scottish Liberal Democrats and Deputy Leader of the Liberal Democrats)
- Annabel Goldie, Baroness Goldie (former leader of the Scottish Conservatives)
- Ian Duncan, Baron Duncan of Springbank (former member of the European Parliament for the constituency of Scotland)
- Nosheena Mobarik, Baroness Mobarik (former member of the European Parliament for the constituency of Scotland)
- Murray Elder, Baron Elder (former general secretary of the Scottish Labour Party)

Former Lords Advocate include:

- James Mackay, Baron Mackay of Clashfern (former lord advocate and lord chancellor)
- Colin Boyd, Baron Boyd of Duncansby (former lord advocate)

Scottish hereditary peers include:

- Thomas Galbraith, 2nd Baron Strathclyde (former Leader of the House of Lords)
- Charles Hay, 16th Earl of Kinnoull (chair of the European Union Committee)
- Alexander Scrymgeour, 12th Earl of Dundee (former member of the House of Commons and former lord-in-waiting)
- James Lindesay-Bethune, 16th Earl of Lindsay (former under-secretary of state for Scotland)
- James Graham, 8th Duke of Montrose (former shadow minister for the Scotland Office)
- Patrick Boyle, 10th Earl of Glasgow
- John Sinclair, 3rd Viscount Thurso
- Richard Scott, 10th Duke of Buccleuch

Between the Acts of Union 1707 and the Peerage Act 1963, peers with titles in the Peerage of Scotland were entitled to elect sixteen representative peers to the House of Lords. Between the 1963 Act and the House of Lords Act 1999 the entire hereditary Peerage of Scotland was entitled to sit in the House of Lords, alongside those with titles in the peerages of England, of Ireland, of Great Britain, and of the UK.

== Local government ==
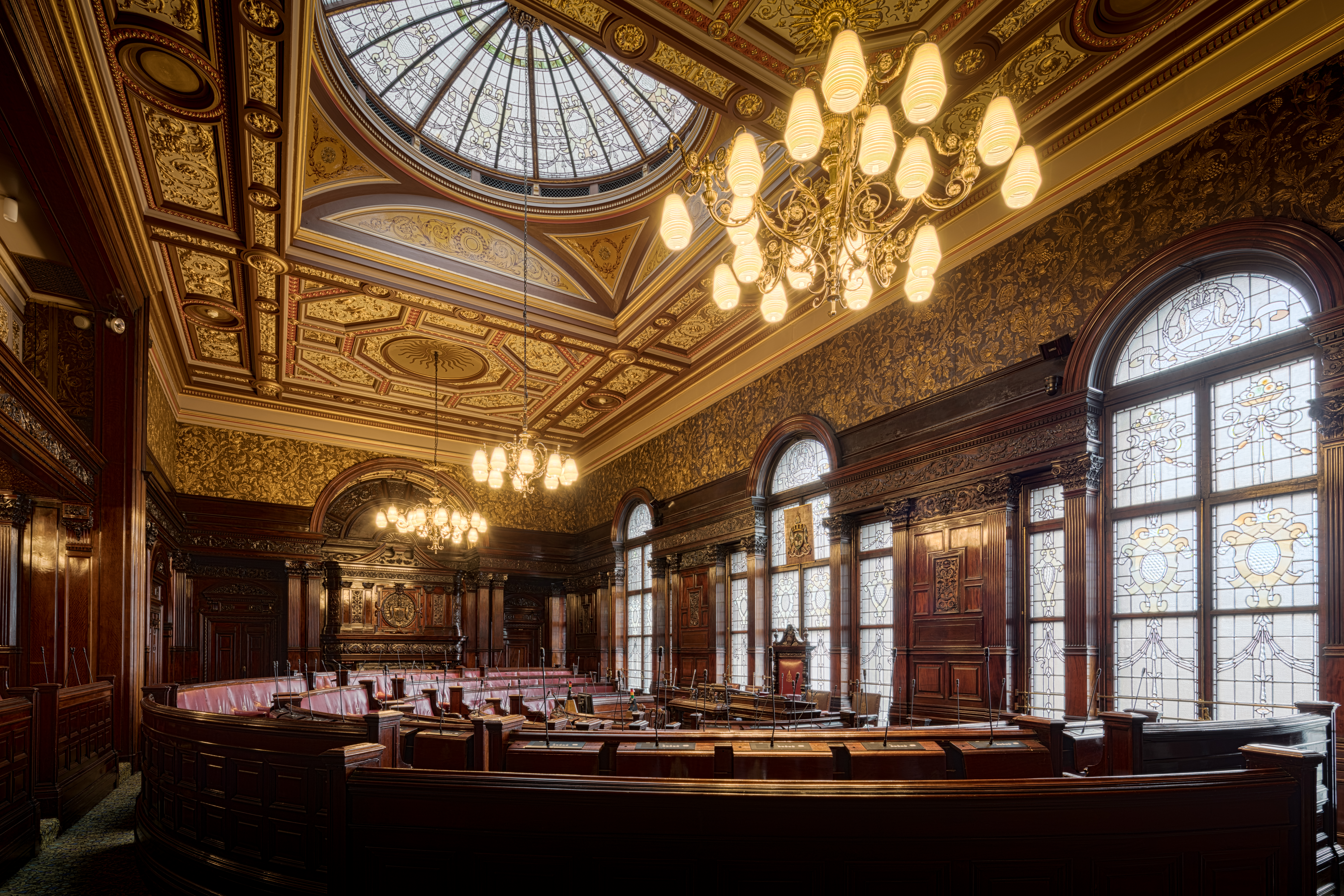
Debating hall of Glasgow City Chambers, seat of Glasgow's City Council

For the purposes of local government in Scotland, the country has been divided into 32 council areas since the Local Government etc. (Scotland) Act 1994. Since the Local Government (Scotland) Act 1973, which also abolished the shires of Scotland, the country has been subdivided into community councils. Though retained for statistical purposes, the civil parishes in Scotland were abolished for administrative purposes in the Local Government (Scotland) Act 1929. Local government in Scotland is organised into 32 unitary authorities. Each local authority is governed by a council consisting of elected councillors, who are elected every five years by registered voters in each of the council areas. Scottish councils co-operate through, and are represented collectively by, the Convention of Scottish Local Authorities (COSLA).

There are currently 1,227 councillors in total, each paid a part-time salary for the undertaking of their duties. Each authority elects a Convener or Provost to chair meetings of the authority's council and act as a figurehead for the area. The four main cities of Scotland, Glasgow, Edinburgh, Aberdeen and Dundee have a Lord Provost who is also, ex officio, Lord Lieutenant for that city. There are in total 32 councils, the largest being the Glasgow City Council with more than 600,000 inhabitants, the smallest, Orkney Islands Council, with fewer than 20,000 people. See Subdivisions of Scotland for a list of the council areas.

The most recent local elections in Scotland were held in 2022 and the next local elections are scheduled for 2027.

=== Community councils ===
Community councils represent the interests of local people. Local authorities have a statutory duty to consult community councils on planning, development and other issues directly affecting that local community. However, the community council has no direct say in the delivery of services. In many areas they do not function at all, but some work very effectively at improving their local area.

== Political parties ==
Scottish National Party (SNP): The current party forming the Scottish Government is the Scottish National Party (SNP), which won 58 of 129 seats available in the 2026 Scottish Parliament election, six less seats than in 2021. The SNP was formed in 1934 with the aim of restoring Scottish independence. They are broadly centre-left and are in the European social-democratic mould. They are the largest party in the Scottish Parliament and have formed the Scottish Government since the 2007 Scottish Parliament election.

Scottish Conservatives and Unionist Party: The Unionist Party was allied with the UK Conservative Party until 1965, when the Scottish Conservative and Unionist Party was formed. The Conservatives then entered a long-term decline in Scotland, culminating in their failure to win any Scottish seats in the 1997 UK election. At the four subsequent UK elections (2001, 2005, 2010 and 2015) the Conservatives won only one Scottish seat. The party enjoyed a revival of fortunes in the 2016 Scottish Parliament election, winning 31 seats and finishing in second place. In the 2021 Scottish Parliament elections, they got 22.8% of the vote, winning 31 seats again. The Conservatives are a centre-right party.

Scottish Labour Party: In the course of the twentieth century, Scottish Labour rose to prominence as Scotland's main political force. The party was established to represent the interests of workers and trade unionists. From 1999 to 2007, they operated as the senior partners in a coalition Scottish Executive. They lost power in 2007 when the SNP won a plurality of seats and entered a period of dramatic decline, losing all but one of their seats in the 2015 UK election and falling to third place in the 2016 Scottish election. The 2017 UK election produced a mixed result for the party as it gained six seat and increased its vote by 2.8% but the party came in third behind the SNP and Scottish Conservatives. In the 2021 Scottish Parliament elections, they got 19.8% of the vote, winning 22 seats.

Liberal Democrats: The Scottish Liberal Democrats were the junior partners in the 1999 to 2007 coalition Scottish Executive. The party has lost much of its electoral presence in Scotland since the UK Liberal Democrats entered into a coalition government with the UK Conservative Party in 2010. In the 2015 UK election they were reduced from 12 seats to one seat, and since the 2016 Scottish Parliament election they have had the fifth highest number of MSPs (five), unchanged on 2011.In the 2021 Scottish Parliament elections, they got 6% of the vote, winning 4 seats.

Scottish Green Party: The Scottish Greens have won regional additional member seats in every Scottish Parliament election, as a result of the proportional representation electoral system. They won one MSP in 1999, increased their total to seven at the 2003 election but saw this drop back to two at the 2007 election. They retained two seats at the 2011 election, then increased this total to six in the 2016 election. In the 2021 Scottish Parliament election they increased their representation by two seats to a total of eight members of the Scottish Parliament, however this was lowered to 7 a week later after Alison Johnson became Holyrood's Presiding Officer, a neutral role meaning she had to give up her position as a Green MSP). The Greens support Scottish independence and Scottish republicanism, and in 2021, entered into a power sharing agreement with the Scottish National Party. Known as the Bute House Agreement, it was agreed in August 2021 to support the Third Sturgeon government, and saw two Scottish Green politicians appointed to junior ministerial posts within the Scottish Government. First was the first time any Green politician had served in government in Scotland and across the United Kingdom. The Scottish Greens left the Scottish Government on 25 April 2024, following First Minister Humza Yousaf's announcement of the ending of the Bute House Agreement "with immediate effect". The Scottish Green Party later confirmed it would "vote to oust" Yousaf as First Minister.

== See also ==
- Elections in Scotland
- Electoral systems in Scotland
- List of by-elections to the Scottish Parliament
- Politics of Aberdeen
- Politics of Dundee
- Politics of Edinburgh
- Politics of Glasgow
- Politics of the Highland council area
- Royal Commission on the Constitution (United Kingdom)
- Scottish media
- Scottish national identity
