= Devolved, reserved and excepted matters =

UK public policy areas

In the United Kingdom, devolved matters are the areas of public policy where the Parliament of the United Kingdom has devolved its legislative power to the national legislatures of Scotland, Wales and Northern Ireland, while reserved matters and excepted matters are the areas where the UK Parliament retains exclusive power to legislate.

Devolution in the United Kingdom is regarded as the decentralisation of power from the UK Government, with powers devolved to the Scottish Parliament and Scottish Government, the Northern Ireland Assembly and Northern Ireland Executive and the Welsh Parliament and Welsh Government, in all areas except those which are reserved or excepted. Amongst the four countries of the United Kingdom, Scotland has the most extensive devolved powers controlled by the Scottish Parliament, with the Scottish Government being described as "one of the world’s most powerful devolved administrations".

In theory, reserved matters could be devolved at a later date, whereas excepted matters (defined only in relation to Northern Ireland) are not supposed to be considered for further devolution. In practice, the difference is minor as Westminster is responsible for all the powers on both lists and its consent is both necessary and sufficient to devolve them. Because Westminster acts with sovereign supremacy, it is still able to pass legislation for all parts of the United Kingdom, including in relation to devolved matters.

== Devolution of powers ==
The current devolution of powers are set out in four main acts legislated by the UK Parliament for each of the devolved governments in Scotland, Wales, Northern Ireland with the devolution of powers for the Government of Northern Ireland being set out in a fourth act, which has now been repealed and the subdivisions in England. The acts also include subsequent amendments, which devolved further powers to the administrations:

- in relation to the Parliament of Northern Ireland and Government of Northern Ireland: the Government of Ireland Act 1920 as amended.
- in relation to the Northern Ireland Assembly and Northern Ireland Executive: the Northern Ireland Act 1998 amended by Northern Ireland (St Andrews Agreement) Act 2006 and the Northern Ireland Act 2009.
- in relation to the Scottish Parliament and Scottish Government: the Scotland Act 1998 amended by the Scotland Act 2012 and the Scotland Act 2016.
- in relation to the Senedd and the Welsh Government: the Government of Wales Act 2006 (formerly the Government of Wales Act 1998), the Wales Act 2014 and the Wales Act 2017
- in relation to the English Strategic authorities the English Devolution and Community Empowerment Act

As a result of the historical and administrative differences between Scotland, Wales Northern Ireland and subdivisions in England, matters which are devolved and which are reserved, varies between each country and subdivision in the case of England.

In Northern Ireland, the Parliament of Northern Ireland was given a general grant of powers with a list of specific reserved matters that were excluded.

In Northern Ireland, the powers of the Northern Ireland Assembly do not cover reserved matters or excepted matters.

In Scotland, a list of reserved matters is explicitly listed in the Scotland Act 1998 (and amended by the Scotland Acts of 2012 and 2016). Any matter not explicitly listed in the Act is implicitly devolved to the Scottish Parliament. The Scottish Parliament controls around 60% of spending in Scotland. Any form of revenue raised within the Scottish economy will remain in Scotland, whilst the Scottish Government is permitted to retain the first ten percentage points of VAT collected in Scotland (50% of revenue). Additionally, the Scottish Government has control over Air Passenger Duty (the tax to be paid by air travellers leaving Scotland), Aggregates Levy (the power to tax companies involved in extracting aggregates within Scotland) and has additional borrowing powers which permits the Scottish Government to borrow up to 10% of its budget annually. The Scottish Government can borrow up to £3.05 billion in additional funding to invest in capital projects, such as schools, transportation networks and hospitals, amongst other areas.

In Wales, a list of reserved matters is explicitly listed under the provisions of the Wales Act 2017. Any matter not explicitly listed in the Act is implicitly devolved to the Senedd. Before 2017, a list of matters was explicitly devolved to the then known National Assembly for Wales and any matter not listed in the Act was implicitly reserved to Westminster. In Wales, the Welsh Government became responsible for income tax only in 2019, meaning individuals with their permanent residence located in Wales and, as a result, pay Income Tax in Wales, will now pay Welsh rates of Income Tax which is set by the Welsh Government. Additionally, the Welsh Government has been granted powers over Land Transaction Tax and Landfill Disposals Tax.

== England ==
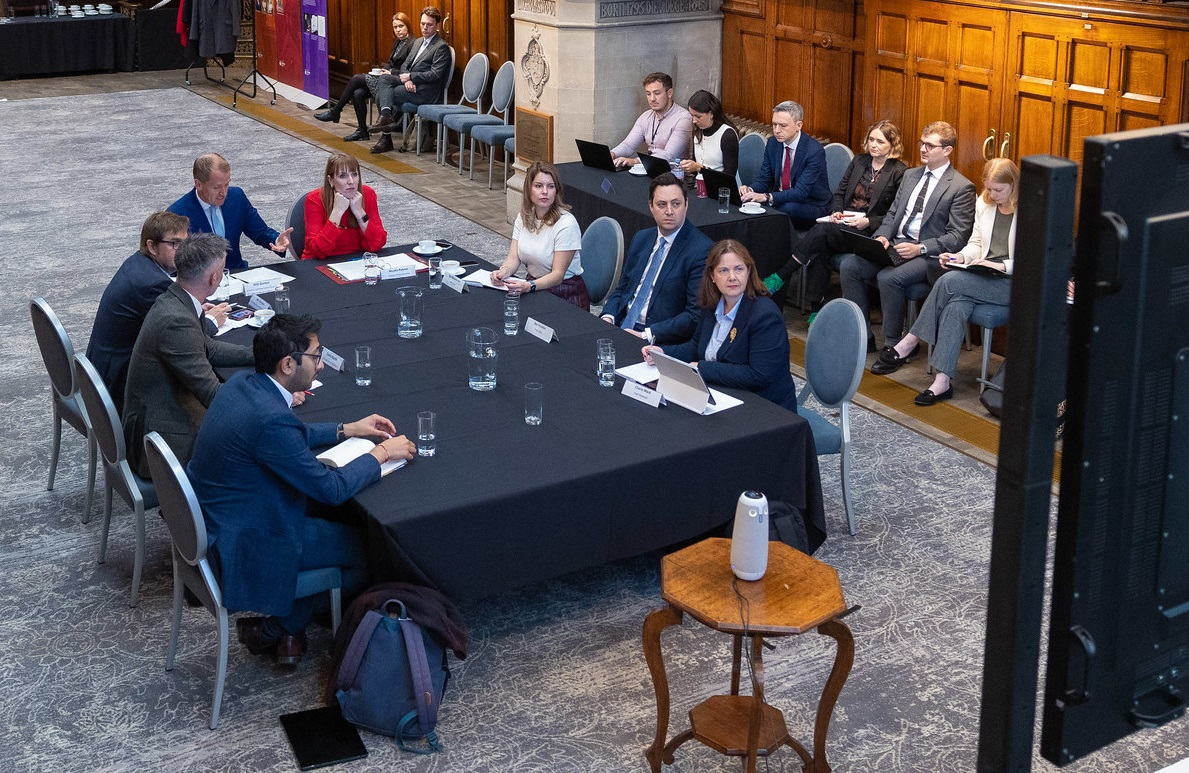

Devolution in England is sui generis within the United Kingdom with the focus on executive powers while legislative powers remain with the UK Parliament.

In England powers for Combined authorities and the Greater London Authority are devolved under multiple pieces of legislation, the most recent is the English Devolution and Community Empowerment Act and are collectively referred to as strategic authority.

The list of powers devolved to the Combined Authorities and Greater London Authority vary but the overall list is below: (Note: The English Devolution and Community Empowerment Act 2026 sets out powers that are devolved to the Combined authorities by default)

- access to funds for local government including the shared prosperity fund and the local growth funds.
- council tax
- development corporations
- employment
- energy planning
- environment
- health
- housing
- local enterprise partnership
- mayoral development corporations
- planning and development
- police and crime commissioner
- public safety reform
- skills
- transport (inc local roads)
- urban regeneration

Established Strategic Authorities have the power to request more powers from the UK Government under section 53 of the English Devolution and Community Empowerment Act 2026.

== Scotland and Wales ==
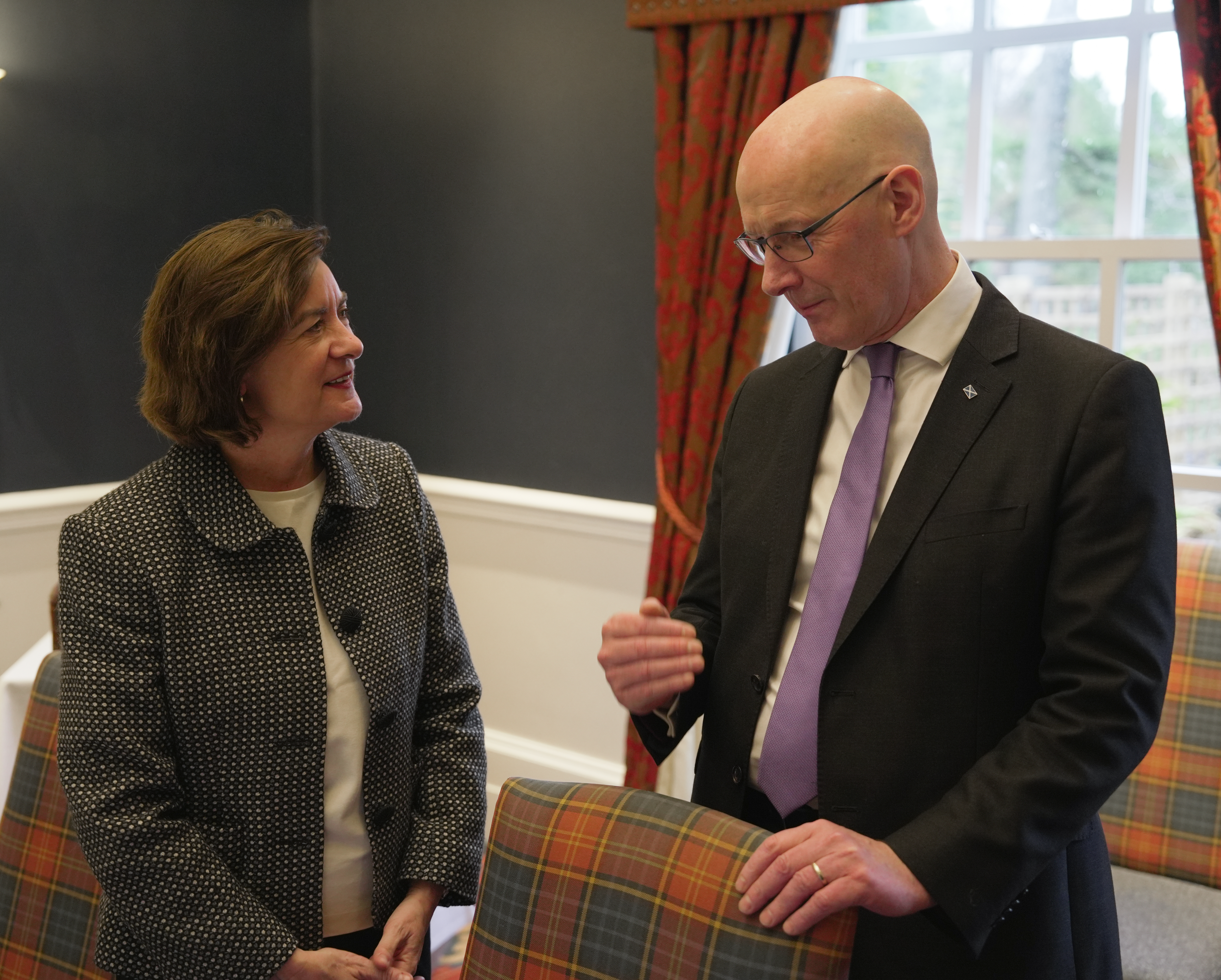
The First Minister of Scotland, John Swinney, and First Minister of Wales, Eluned Morgan, meet in Edinburgh, Scotland.

The devolution schemes in Scotland and Wales are set up in a similar manner. The Parliament of the United Kingdom has granted legislative power to the Scottish Parliament and the Senedd through the Scotland Act 1998 and the Government of Wales Act 2006 respectively. These Acts set out the matters still dealt with by the UK Government, referred to as reserved matters.

Anything not listed as a specific reserved matter in the Scotland Act or the Wales Act is devolved to that nation.

The legal ability of the Scottish Parliament or Senedd to legislate (its "legislative competence") on a matter is largely determined by whether it is reserved or not. Both parliaments can overturn any piece of existing UK legislation and introduce legislation in areas not retained by Westminster. Whereas prior to 2017, the former Welsh Assembly was only permitted to amend existing UK legislation passed by the UK Parliament in the areas devolved to Wales.

The Scottish Parliament has substantially more powers than both the Senedd and Northern Ireland Assembly, with the Scottish Government being described as "one of the most powerful devolved governments in the world". The Scottish Parliament has the power to set different rates and bands of income tax, whilst the Senedd may only vary rates within the current UK bands. Additionally, Scotland has been granted substantially more powers on international affairs and foreign engagement. Despite foreign affairs remaining a reserved matter to the UK parliament, the Scottish Government has been granted authority to be more directly involved in government decision making on European Union matters and relations. In Wales, this is not the case, with the Welsh Government having no additional power on international relations, with this right being retained by the Secretary of State for Wales in the UK Government.

Scotland has the most extensive tax powers of any of the devolved governments, followed by Wales and Northern Ireland. The three devolved governments have full legislative power over council tax, business tax, whilst Scotland and Wales has additional tax powers in areas such as property tax, landfill tax, stamp tax and some aspects of income tax, whilst the Northern Ireland Executive does not. Furthermore, Scotland has legislative control over areas such as air passenger duty, value added tax (VAT) and aggregates levy. The Welsh Government and Northern Ireland Executive do not have control over those areas in their respective countries.

=== Devolved powers in Scotland ===
Scotland

Of the three countries within the United Kingdom with devolved parliaments, the Scottish Parliament has the most extensive devolved powers in which it is responsible for.

The responsibilities of the Scottish Ministers broadly follow those of the Scottish Parliament provided for in the Scotland Act 1998 and subsequent UK legislation. Where pre-devolution legislation of the UK Parliament provided that certain functions could be performed by UK Government ministers, these functions were transferred to the Scottish Ministers if they were within the legislative competence of the Scottish Parliament.

Functions which were devolved under the Scotland Act 1998 included:

- Healthcare – NHS Scotland, mental health, dentistry, social care
- Education – pre-school, primary, secondary, further, higher and lifelong education, as well as educational training policy and programmes
- Student Awards Agency for Scotland
- Scottish Public Pensions Agency
- Scots law and justice – civil justice, civil law and procedure, courts, criminal justice, criminal law and procedure, debt and bankruptcy, family law, legal aid, the legal profession, property law and Disclosure Scotland
- Most aspects of transport – setting drink and drug-driving limits, speed limits, some aspects of railways, including Scottish passenger rail franchises (ScotRail), concessionary travel schemes, cycling, parking, local road pricing, congestion charging, promotion of road safety and road signs
- Environment – environmental protection policy, climate change, pollution, waste management, water supplies and sewerage, national parks and flood and coastal protection
- Policing and the Scottish Prison Service
- Planning system in Scotland
- Rural Affairs (including Cairngorms National Park Authority, Loch Lomond and The Trossachs National Park Authority, Crofting Commission, Scottish Forestry, Forestry and Land Scotland, Scottish Environment Protection Agency, NatureScot and Scottish Land Commission)
- Housing – housing policy, Scottish Housing Regulator, affordable homes, homelessness and homelessness legislation, child poverty, security of tenure, energy efficiency, homeownership, short assured tenancy, rented housing and rent control, Town Centre First, social rents, private sector housing security, Tenancy deposit schemes, Scottish Social Housing Charter and the Scottish Housing Quality Standard
- Accountant in Bankruptcy
- Agriculture, forestry and fisheries – most aspects of animal welfare, but not including animal testing and research
- Sport and the arts – Creative Scotland, the National Gallery of Scotland, library and museum collections, the National Museum of Scotland, national performing companies and SportScotland, the national agency for sport
- Consumer advocacy and advice
- Tourism – VisitScotland and promotion of major events in Scotland
- Economic development
- Freedom of Information (FOI) requests

Subsequently, the Scotland Acts of 2012 and 2016 transferred powers over:

- Some taxation powers – full control of Income Tax on income earned through employment, Land and Buildings Transaction Tax, Landfill Tax, Aggregates Levy, Air Departure Tax, Revenue Scotland
- Drink driving limits
- Air weapons
- Additional borrowing powers, up to the sum of £5 billion
- Transport police in Scotland
- Road signs, speed limits and abortion rights in Scotland
- Powers over Income Tax rates and bands on non-savings and non-dividend income
- Scottish Parliament and local authority elections
- Some social security powers (Adult Disability Payment, Pension Age Disability Payment, Funeral Support Payment, Carer Support Payment, Young Carer Grant, Job Start Payment, Winter Heating Payment)
- Crown Estate of Scotland – management of the Crown Estate's economic assets in Scotland
- Some aspects of the benefits system – Best Start Grant, Carer's Allowance Supplement, Child Disability Payment, Child Winter Heating Assistance, Funeral Support Payment, Universal Credit (although this remains a reserved benefit, some powers over how it is paid have been devolved to the Scottish Parliament)
- Extended powers over Employment Support and the housing aspect of Universal Credit
- Some aspects of the energy network in Scotland – renewable energy, energy efficiency and onshore oil and gas licensing
- The right to receive half of the VAT raised in Scotland.
- Some aspects of equality legislation in Scotland
- Gaming machine licensing

The 1998 Act also provided for orders to be made allowing Scottish Ministers to exercise powers of UK Government ministers in areas that remain reserved to the Parliament of the United Kingdom. Equally the Act allows for the Scottish Ministers to transfer functions to the UK Government ministers, or for particular "agency arrangements". This executive devolution means that the powers of the Scottish Ministers and the Scottish Parliament are not identical.

The members of the Scottish government have substantial influence over legislation in Scotland, putting forward the majority of bills that are successful in becoming Acts of the Scottish Parliament.

=== Devolved powers in Wales ===
Wales

Following the "yes" vote in the referendum on further law-making powers for the assembly on 3 March 2011, the Welsh Government is now entitled to propose bills to the National Assembly for Wales on subjects within 20 fields of policy. Subject to limitations prescribed by the Government of Wales Act 2006, Acts of the National Assembly may make any provision that could be made by Act of Parliament. The 20 areas of responsibility devolved to the National Assembly for Wales (and within which Welsh ministers exercise executive functions) are:

The Government of Wales Act 2006 updated the list of fields, as follows:

- agriculture, fisheries, forestry and rural development
- ancient monuments and historic buildings
- culture
- economic development
- education and training
- environment
- fire and rescue services and promotion of fire safety
- food
- health and health services
- highways and transport
- housing
- local government
- the National Assembly for Wales
- public administration
- social welfare
- sport and recreation
- tourism
- town and country planning
- water and flood defence
- the Welsh language

Schedule 5 to the 2006 Act could be amended to add specific matters to the broad subject fields, thereby extending the legislative competence of the Assembly.

=== Comparison between Scottish and Welsh powers ===
Specific reservations cover policy areas which can only be regulated by Westminster, listed under 'heads':

Head	Scotland	Wales
Head A: Financial and economic matters
Fiscal, economic and monetary policy	Reserved	Reserved
The currency	Reserved	Reserved
Financial services and financial markets	Reserved	Reserved
Money laundering	Reserved	Reserved
Distribution of money from dormant bank accounts	Devolved	Reserved
Head B: Home affairs
Elections to the House of Commons	Reserved	Reserved
Emergency powers	Reserved	Reserved
Immigration and nationality	Reserved	Reserved
Extradition	Reserved	Reserved
National security and counter-terrorism	Reserved	Reserved
Policing, criminal investigations and private security	Devolved	Reserved
Anti-social behaviour and public order	Devolved	Reserved
Illicit drugs	Reserved	Reserved
Firearms	Reserved	Reserved
Air gun licensing	Devolved	Reserved
Betting, gaming and lotteries	Reserved	Reserved
Knives	Devolved	Reserved
Alcohol	Devolved	Reserved
Hunting with dogs and dangerous dogs	Devolved	Reserved
Prostitution, modern slavery	Devolved	Reserved
Scientific procedures on live animals	Reserved	Reserved
Access to information	Reserved	Reserved (Note: Appears under Head L in the Wales Act.)
Data protection	Reserved	Reserved
Lieutenancies	Reserved	Reserved
Charities	Devolved	Reserved
Head C: Trade and industry
Regulation of businesses, insolvency, competition law	Mostly reserved (Note: The Scotland Act contains numerous exceptions to the reserved powers concerning insolvency.)	Reserved
Copyright and intellectual property	Reserved	Reserved
Import and export control	Reserved	Reserved
Sea fishing outside the Scottish zone	Reserved	—N/a
Consumer protection, product standards and product safety	Reserved	Reserved
Consumer advocacy and advice	Devolved	Reserved
Weights and measures	Reserved	Reserved
Telecommunications and postal services	Reserved	Reserved
Research councils	Reserved	Reserved
Industrial development and protection of trading interests	Reserved	Reserved
Water and sewerage outside Wales	—N/a	Reserved
Pubs Code Regulations	Devolved	Reserved
Sunday trading	Devolved	Reserved
Head D: Energy
Electricity	Reserved	Reserved
Oil and gas, coal and nuclear energy	Reserved	Reserved
Heating and cooling	Devolved	Reserved
Energy efficiency	Reserved	Reserved
Head E: Transport
Traffic, vehicle and driver regulation	Reserved	Reserved
Train services	Partially devolved (Note: The construction of railways and the franchising of passenger services is devolved in Scotland.)	Reserved
Policing of railways and railway property	Devolved	Reserved
Navigation, shipping regulation and coastguard	Reserved	Reserved
Ports, harbours and shipping services outside Scotland or Wales	Reserved	Reserved
Air transport	Reserved	Reserved
Head F: Social security
National Insurance, social security schemes	Mostly reserved (Note: These powers are mostly reserved, but the Scottish Parliament can legislate on various disability, industrial injuries, and carer's benefits, maternity, funeral and heating expenses benefits, discretionary housing payments, and various schemes for job search and support.)	Reserved
Child support	Reserved	Reserved
Occupational, personal and war pensions	Reserved	Reserved
Public sector compensation	Devolved	Reserved
Head G: Regulation of the professions
Regulation of architects and auditors	Reserved	Reserved
Regulation of the health professions	Reserved	Reserved
Head H: Employment
Employment and industrial relations	Reserved	Reserved
Health and safety	Reserved	Reserved (Note: Appears under Head J in the Wales Act.)
Industrial training boards	Devolved	Reserved
Job search and support	Reserved	Reserved
Head J: Health and medicines
Abortion	Devolved	Reserved
Xenotransplantation	Reserved	Reserved
Embryology, surrogacy and human genetics	Reserved	Reserved
Medicines, medical supplies and poisons	Reserved	Reserved (Note: The matter of poisons appears under Head B in the Wales Act.)
Welfare foods	Devolved	Reserved
Head K: Media and culture
Broadcasting	Reserved	Reserved
Public lending right	Reserved	Reserved
Government Indemnity Scheme for cultural objects on loan	Reserved	Reserved
Safety of sports grounds	Devolved	Reserved
(Wales only) Part 1: The Constitution
The Crown Estate	Devolved	Reserved
(Wales only) Head L: Justice
The legal profession, legal services and legal aid	Devolved	Reserved
Coroners	Devolved (Note: There are no coroners in Scotland. Instead, deaths that need to be investigated are reported to the procurator fiscal.)	Reserved
Arbitration	Devolved	Reserved
Mental capacity	Devolved	Reserved
Personal data	Devolved	Reserved
Public sector information and public records	Devolved	Reserved
Compensation for persons affected by crime	Devolved	Reserved
Prisons and offender management	Devolved	Reserved
Marriage, family relationships, matters concerning children	Devolved	Reserved
Gender recognition	Devolved (Note: Gender recognition is not explicitly reserved under the Scotland Acts. However, in 2023 the Secretary of State vetoed the Gender Recognition Reform (Scotland) Bill under Section 35 of the 1998 Act on the grounds that it affected the operation of the Equality Act 2010, which is reserved.)	Reserved
Registration of births, deaths and places of worship	Devolved	Reserved
(Wales only) Head M: Land and Agricultural Assets
Registration of land, agricultural charges and debentures	Devolved	Reserved
Certain powers relating to infrastructure planning, building regulation on Crown land, and land compensation	Devolved	Reserved
Head L (Scotland) / Head N (Wales): Miscellaneous
Judicial salaries (Note: This is a specific reservation in Scotland and a general reservation in Wales.)	Reserved	Reserved
Equal opportunities	Reserved	Reserved
Control of nuclear, biological and chemical weapons	Reserved	Reserved
The Ordnance Survey	Reserved	Reserved
Time and calendars	Reserved	Reserved
Bank holidays	Devolved	Reserved
Outer space	Reserved	Reserved
Antarctica	Reserved	Reserved
Deep sea mining	Devolved	Reserved

The reserved matters continue to be controversial in some quarters and there are certain conflicts or anomalies. For example, in Scotland, the funding of Scottish Gaelic television is controlled by the Scottish Government, but broadcasting is a reserved matter, and while energy is a reserved matter, planning permission for power stations is devolved.

== Northern Ireland ==
Northern Ireland

=== Devolved powers in Northern Ireland ===
- Health and social services
- Education
- Employment and skills
- Agriculture
- Social security
- Pensions and child support
- Housing
- Economic development
- Local government
- Environmental issues, including planning
- Transport
- Culture and sport
- The Northern Ireland Civil Service
- Equal opportunities
- Justice and policing

The Hillsborough Castle Agreement on 5 February 2010 resulted in the following reserved powers being transferred to the Northern Ireland Assembly on 12 April 2010:

- criminal law
- policing
- prosecution
- public order
- courts
- prisons and probation

=== Reserved (excepted) matters ===
Devolution in Northern Ireland was originally provided for in the Government of Ireland Act 1920, which stated that the Parliament of Northern Ireland could not make laws in the following main areas:

- the Crown
- the Union with England, Scotland and Wales
- the making of peace or war
- the armed forces
- treaties or any relations with foreign states or dominions
- naturalization
- external trade
- navigation (including merchant shipping)
- submarine cables
- wireless telegraphy
- aerial navigation
- lighthouses
- currency
- copyright

This was the first practical example of devolution in the United Kingdom and followed three unsuccessful attempts to provide home rule for the whole island of Ireland:

- Government of Ireland Bill 1886
- Government of Ireland Bill 1893
- Government of Ireland Act 1914

Excepted matters are outlined in Schedule 2 of the Northern Ireland Act 1998:

- the Crown
- Parliament of the United Kingdom
- international relations
- international development
- defence
- weapons of mass destruction
- honours
- treason
- immigration and nationality
- taxation
- national insurance
- elections
- currency
- national security
- nuclear energy
- space

Reserved matters are outlined in Schedule 3 of the Northern Ireland Act 1998:

- navigation (including merchant shipping)
- civil aviation
- The foreshore, sea bed and subsoil and their natural resources
- postal services
- import and export controls, external trade
- national minimum wage
- financial services
- financial markets
- intellectual property
- units of measurement
- telecommunications, broadcasting, internet services
- The National Lottery
- xenotransplantation
- surrogacy
- human fertilisation and embryology
- human genetics
- consumer safety in relation to goods

Following the suspension of the Parliament of Northern Ireland, policing and justice powers transferred to the UK Parliament and were subsequently administered by the Northern Ireland Office within the UK Government. These powers were not devolved following the Belfast Agreement.

Some policing and justice powers remain reserved to Westminster:

- the prerogative of mercy in terrorism cases
- drug classification
- the National Crime Agency
- accommodation of prisoners in separated conditions
- parades
- security of explosives

A number of policing and justice powers remain excepted matters and were not devolved. These include:

- extradition (as an international relations matter)
- military justice (as a defence matter)
- immigration
- national security (including intelligence services)

Irish unionists initially opposed home rule, but later accepted it for Northern Ireland, where they formed a majority. (The rest of the island became independent as what is now the Republic of Ireland.)

=== History of Northern Irish devolution ===
The Parliament of Northern Ireland was suspended on 30 March 1972 by the Northern Ireland (Temporary Provisions) Act 1972, with Stormont's legislative powers being transferred to the Queen in Council.

The Parliament of Northern Ireland was abolished outright by the Northern Ireland Constitution Act 1973; legislative competence was conferred instead on the Northern Ireland Assembly. The 1973 Act set out a list of excepted matters (sch. 2) and "minimum" reserved matters (sch. 3).

The new constitutional arrangements quickly failed, and the Assembly was suspended on 29 May 1974, having only passed two Measures.

The Assembly was dissolved under the Northern Ireland Act 1974, which transferred its law-making power to the Queen in Council once again. The 1974 framework of powers continued in place until legislative powers were transferred to the present Northern Ireland Assembly on 2 December 1999, under the Northern Ireland Act 1998, following the Belfast Agreement of 10 April 1998.

=== Parity ===
Northern Ireland has parity with Great Britain in three areas:

- social security
- child support
- pensions

Policy in these areas is technically devolved but, in practice, follows policy set by the UK Parliament to provide consistency across the United Kingdom.

== Common devolved and reserved powers ==
=== Devolved ===
- agriculture, fisheries, forestry and rural development
- borrowing powers (Scotland & Wales)
- culture
- economic development
- education and training
- environment
- fire and rescue services and promotion of fire safety
- food
- health and health services
- housing
- justice and policing (in Scotland & Northern Ireland only)
- local government
- public administration
- social welfare
- sport and recreation
- tourism
- town and country planning
- water and flood defence

=== Reserved ===
Reserved matters are subdivided into two categories: general reservations and specific reservations.

General reservations cover major issues which are always handled centrally by the Parliament in Westminster:

- the Crown
- the constitutional matters listed in Schedule 5 of the 1998 Act
- the UK Parliament
- registration and funding of political parties
- the making of peace or war
- international relations and treaties
- international development
- international trade
- the Civil Service of the United Kingdom
- defence
- treason

Additionally, in Wales, all matters concerning the single legal jurisdiction of England and Wales are reserved, including courts, tribunals, judges, civil and criminal legal proceedings, pardons for criminal offences, private international law, and judicial review of administrative action. An exception in Wales allows the Senedd to create Wales-specific tribunals that are not concerned with reserved matters.
