= Landfill Tax (Scotland) Act 2014 =

- Act of the Scottish Parliament
- Scottish Parliament
- Long title: An Act of the Scottish Parliament to make provision about the taxation of disposals to landfill.
- Citation: 2014 asp 2
- Introduced by: John Swinney MSP
- Territorial extent: Scotland

Dates
- Royal assent: 21 January 2014
- Commencement: 21 January 2014 (in part)

Status: Current legislation

History of passage through the Parliament

Text of statute as originally enacted

The Landfill Tax (Scotland) Act 2014 (asp 2) is an act of the Scottish Parliament, introduced to the legislature in 2013 and receiving Royal Assent on 21 January 2014, which creates a new Scottish Landfill Tax. The tax applies mainly to waste management companies and local authorities disposing of waste at landfill.

== History ==
As part of further devolution of powers to the Scottish Government, the Scotland Act 2012 allowed the government to introduce and raise a Landfill Tax. The Landfill Tax (Scotland) Bill was introduced to the Scottish Parliament on 17 April 2013 by John Swinney MSP. It was discussed by and subsequently passed by Parliament in late 2013 and became law on 21 January 2014, having received royal assent. Sections 34, 35, 40, 41, 42 and 44 of the act came into force on the day of royal assent, with the remainder coming into force through later orders of the Scottish Ministers.

== Taxation ==
Scottish Landfill Tax became payable from 1 April 2015 on qualifying deposits of waste at landfill. The act specified that the tax payable for disposal of waste at landfill would be set by multiplying the standard rate by the weight of the deposit, with the rate to be specified by the Scottish Ministers in a later order. The initial rate of tax was set at £82.60 for the standard rate and £2.60 for the lower rate. As of 1 April 2016, these increased, with the standard rate of Scottish Landfill Tax set at £84.40 per tonne, and a lower rate of £2.68 per tonne applying to "qualifying materials", which includes deposits such as waste soils and minerals. Tax revenues are collected by Revenue Scotland.

== See also ==
- Scottish Landfill Tax
- United Kingdom Landfill Tax
- Taxation in Scotland
- Taxation in the United Kingdom
