= Revenue Scotland =

Public body of the Scottish Government

- Scottish Gaelic: Teachd-a-steach Alba

Non-ministerial office overview
- Formed: 1 January 2015
- Jurisdiction: Scotland
- Headquarters: Victoria Quay, Edinburgh
- Employees: 108 (April 2026)
- Annual budget: £14.3 million
- Ministers responsible: Jenny Gilruth, Cabinet Secretary for Finance; Hannah Mary Goodlad, Minister for Public Finance
- Non-ministerial office executives: Johanna Boyd, Chief Executive; Aidan O'Carrol, Chair
- Key document: Scotland Act 2012
- Website: revenue.scot

Revenue Scotland (Scottish Gaelic: Teachd-a-steach Alba) is a non-ministerial office of the Scottish Government responsible for the administration and collection of devolved taxes in Scotland. It is accountable to the Scottish Parliament.

== History ==
Prior to 1707, Scotland was an independent state with its own system of taxation. This was abolished following the Union with England, and since then most taxes in Scotland had been collected by the UK Government.

Revenue Scotland was formed in 2012 as an administrative unit of the Scottish Government, in anticipation of it becoming responsible for collecting taxes devolved to the Scottish Parliament under the terms of the Scotland Act 2012. The Revenue Scotland and Tax Powers Act (RSTPA) 2014, which established the legal basis for the operation of Revenue Scotland, was passed by the Scottish Parliament in August 2014.

Revenue Scotland was founded on 1 January 2015, becoming the first Scotland-wide tax collection system in more than 300 years.

The Scotland Act 2016 devolved Air Passenger Duty and Aggregates Levy to the Parliament. Devolution of Aggregates Levy has been delayed due to long running legal issues surrounding the tax. The Scottish Aggregate Tax is expected to replace the UK Aggregates Levy in April 2026.

As of 2026 there are plans to introduce a Scottish Building Safety Levy, taking effect in April 2028, to cover the costs associated with the cladding scandal. This required devolution of the power to introduce such a tax from the United Kingdom Government, which introduced a similar Building Safety Levy in England taking effect from October 2026.

There have been difficulties implementing the Scottish Government's designed replacement for Air Passenger Duty, Air Departure Tax. On 12 January 2026 it was announced these issues have now resolved. It is due to be introduced in 2027.

== Devolved taxes ==
=== Implemented 2015 ===
- Land and Buildings Transaction Tax (LBTT)
- Scottish Landfill Tax (SLfT)

=== Implemented 2026 ===
- Scottish Aggregates Tax (SAT)

=== Pending ===
- Air Departure Tax (ADT) - due 2027
- Scottish Building Safety Levy (SBSL) - due 2027

== Governance structure ==
The Minister responsible for Revenue Scotland is the Cabinet Secretary for Finance, Shona Robison MSP. Eleanor Emberson was appointed in 2012 to lead the organisation while it was being set up Elaine Lorimer CBE succeeded Emberson as Chief Executive in March 2016. In December 2025 Johanna Boyd succeeded Lorimer becoming the organisations third Chief Executive.

The Board of Revenue Scotland is composed of 8 members. Its main role is to develop and approve Revenue Scotland’s overall strategy, approve final business plans and advise the Chief Executive on key appointments. It also performs an assurance role and advises on best practice.

=== Board ===
Aidan O'Carrol is the current permanent chair.

As of April 2026 the members of the Board are:

- Aidan O'Carrol, Chair
- Rt Hon Ken Macintosh
- Robert Macintosh
- Idong Usoro
- Simon Cunningham
- Gillian Wheeler
- Alison MacDonald
- 1 x Vacancy

The Senior Management Team is composed of a Chief Executive, a Head of Legal Services, a Head of Tax and a Head of Strategy & Transformation and a Head of Corporate.

== See also ==
- HM Revenue and Customs
- Welsh Revenue Authority
