= Insurance Premium Tax (United Kingdom) =

Insurance Premium Tax (IPT) is a type of indirect tax levied on general insurance premiums in the United Kingdom.

== Overview ==
The UK government introduced the Insurance Premium Tax to raise revenue from the insurance sector, which was viewed as being under-taxed, and not subject to Value Added Tax. The main EU legislation regarding VAT (Council Directive 2006/112/EC) states that insurance and reinsurance transactions, including related services performed by insurance brokers and insurance agents, are exempt from VAT.

The Insurance Premium Tax was announced by Kenneth Clarke in the November 1993 budget and introduced with the Finance Act 1994 which received royal assent on 3 May 1994. IPT is under the care and management of HM Revenue & Customs.

IPT raised £2.3 billion in the fiscal year 2009/10.

== Law ==
The main law relating to IPT includes:

- the Finance Act 1994 (sections 48-74 and schedules 6A, 7 and 7A, as amended by the Finance Acts 1997, 1998, 1999, 2003, 2007, 2008, 2009 and 2010), which is the primary legislation establishing the principles of IPT
- the Insurance Premium Tax Regulations 1994 (statutory instrument 1994/1774 - as amended), which is the main secondary legislation relating to IPT and which gives more details about the operation of the tax

== Rates ==
There are two different insurance premium tax rates:

- a standard rate of 12%
- a higher rate of 20%

Insurers providing taxable insurance are required to register and account for IPT, as must intermediaries who sell insurance subject to the higher rate of IPT and charge a separate insurance-related fee on top of the premium itself.

The Chancellor George Osborne stated in the 2016 spring budget that the standard rate of IPT would increase from 9.5% to 10% from 1 October 2016.

In the 2016 autumn statement the new Chancellor Philip Hammond stated that the standard rate would increase from 10% to 12% from 1 June 2017.

== Historic rates ==
From 1 October 1994 to 31 March 1997, a single rate of 2.5% was charged. From 1 April 1997, two rates were charged:

=== Standard rate ===
- 1 April 1997 to 30 June 1999 - a standard rate of 4%
- 1 July 1999 to 3 January 2011 - a standard rate of 5%
- 4 January 2011 to 31 October 2015 - a standard rate of 6%
- 1 November 2015 to 30 September 2016 - a standard rate of 9.5%
- 1 October 2016 to 31 May 2017- a standard rate of 10%
- From 1 June 2017, the standard rate is 12%

=== Higher rate ===
- 1 April 1997 to 4 January 2011 - a selective higher rate of 17.5% on certain types of insurance arranged through certain suppliers of other goods and services, in line with VAT
- From 1 August 1998 - the higher rate was extended to all taxable travel insurance, regardless of the type of supplier
- From 4 January 2011 - the higher rate rose to 20%, in line with VAT

== Exemptions ==
All types of insurance risk located in the UK are taxable unless they are specifically exempted. Exemptions from this tax include:

- reinsurance
- life insurance, permanent-health insurance and all other ‘long term’ insurance, except health insurance
- commercial aircraft and some associated liabilities
- commercial ships and some associated liabilities
- lifeboats and lifeboat equipment
- foreign or international railway rolling stock and some associated liabilities
- export finance
- commercial goods in international transit
- block insurance policies held by Motability which covers all disabled drivers who lease their cars and motor cycles through the scheme
- risks located outside the UK
- the Channel Tunnel

== IPT registration ==
Businesses are required to register for IPT if they are:

- an insurer who receives or intends to receive taxable insurance premiums
- an intermediary who charges a fee to the insured in addition to the amount of higher rated premium due

Businesses must be registered from the date they receive (or someone receives on their behalf) their first taxable premium. Businesses must inform HM Revenue & Customs within 30 days of forming the intention of receiving taxable premiums as the insurer.

== See also ==
- Financial services
- Financial Conduct Authority
- HM Revenue & Customs
- Insurance
- Tax
