= Scottish Landfill Tax =

Scottish tax

Scottish Landfill Tax (SLfT) is a tax which is charged in Scotland under the Landfill Tax (Scotland) Act 2014. It replaced the UK Landfill Tax from 1 April 2015.

The tax is administered and collected by Revenue Scotland, with regulatory support from the Scottish Environment Protection Agency (SEPA).

The rates of Scottish Landfill Tax (given in £/tonne) are £84.40 (standard rate) and £2.65 (lower rate) from 1 April 2016, increased from the preceding year's rates of £82.60 and £2.60 respectively. The rates for the 2019–20 year will increase to £91.35 (standard rate) and £2.90 (lower rate)

== Legislative background ==
The tax was established by the Landfill Tax (Scotland) act 2014, which created a devolved landfill tax for Scotland. The Act received Royal assent on 21 January 2014 and provided the framework taxing disposals of waste to landfill.

== See also ==
- Taxation in Scotland
