= Taxation in Scotland =

Taxation in Scotland today involves payments that are required to be made to three different levels of government: to the UK government, to the Scottish Government and to local government. Taxes in Scotland are collected by various bodies – HM Revenue & Customs for reserved taxes, Revenue Scotland for devolved taxes and local taxation authorities.

In 2024–2025, taxation in Scotland controlled by the Scottish Parliament generated £26.2 billion in revenue, with 61% of spending in Scotland raised through devolved taxes controlled by the Scottish Government, and 39% generated through reserved taxes. In the same financial year, 37% of revenue raised in Scotland is devolved to the Scottish Government.

== History ==
Until the 17th century, taxation was regarded as 'an extraordinary source of revenue that was levied for a specific purpose such as the defence of the realm'. However, during the 17th century, Parliament permitted a Land Tax to be collected from 1667, a Hearth tax from 1691 to 1695 and a Poll tax from 1693 to 1699.

The 1707 Union of the Kingdom of Scotland with the Kingdom of England formed a new Kingdom of Great Britain, so that responsibility for taxation in Scotland became a matter for the Westminster Parliament, now the legislature for the new state.

=== Devolution of tax powers ===
The creation of a devolved Scottish parliament in 1999 was accompanied by a limited transfer of taxation powers: the Scotland Act 1998 transferred the power to legislate for local taxation and also the power to vary income tax by plus or minus 3 pence in the pound. Most taxation powers in Scotland following the creation of the parliament remained a reserved matter for Westminster. Following the Calman Commission, the Scotland Act 2012 transferred powers over Stamp duty Land Tax, and Landfill Tax (both since replaced by Land and Buildings Transaction Tax and Scottish Landfill Tax, respectively) and reduced rates of Income tax in Scotland by 10 pence in the pound at all bands, reducing the Barnett formula by the equivalent sum, and requiring the Scottish parliament to set a Scottish Income tax rate to replace the lost revenue but with the ability to set it higher or lower than 10 pence in the pound if it wished.

Following promises made during the Scottish independence referendum that led to the Smith Commission, the Scotland Act 2016 added powers over Air Passenger Duty and full control over Income tax on non savings and non dividend income (excluding the personal allowance which is still set by the UK parliament.)

Despite these tax powers having been transferred, over half of all taxes collected in Scotland remains under the direct control of the UK parliament which has remained a reserved matter to itself all powers over Corporation tax, National Insurance, Value-added tax (VAT), Capital gains tax, Inheritance tax, Insurance Premium Tax and Motoring taxes.

== Current taxes ==
=== Scottish Government ===
The Scottish Government has full or partial control over the following taxes, and are collected by Revenue Scotland:

- Income Tax – partially devolved. The Scottish Parliament sets rates and bands for non-savings and non-dividend income only. The remaining aspects of Income Tax are reserved to the UK Government, and is collected and administered by HM Revenue & Customs.
- Land and Buildings Transaction Tax - fully devolved to the Scottish Parliament, and administered by Revenue Scotland.
- Landfill Tax - set by the Scottish Parliament and administered by Revenue Scotland.
- Council Tax – fully devolved to the Scottish Parliament, and set, administered, and spent by local authorities
- Non-Domestic Rates – set by the Scottish Parliament, administered and collected by local authorities who retain all of the revenue raised locally.
- Scottish Aggregates Tax – fully devolved to the Scottish Parliament, replaced the UK-wide Aggregates Levy in Scotland from April 2026

==== Value Added Tax (VAT) ====
Under the terms of the Scotland Act 2016, VAT became an assigned tax, meaning a proportion of VAT revenues would be directly assigned to the Scottish budget each year. This has resulted in a reduction in the block grant the Scottish Government receives for spending. The proportion would be the first 10p of the standard rate of VAT and the first 2.5p of the reduced rate of VAT raised in Scotland.

As of November 2025, the Scottish Government and UK Government continues to collaborate to streamline processes for determining specific methodology for calculating how much Scotland receives through this means of revenue. HM Revenue & Customs retain the responsibility for collecting VAT across the United Kingdom, with the UK Government remaining responsible for the operation of VAT.

==== Air Departure Tax ====
The Scotland Act 2016, devolved Air Passenger Duty to the Scottish Government and legislation to introduce Air Departure Tax was passed in the summer of 2017 and was due to begin operations on 1 April 2018. However, on 22 November 2017, the UK and Scottish Ministers announced their intention to delay the introduction of ADT until issues were resolved regarding the tax exemption for flights departing airports in the Highlands and Islands of Scotland. The tax is due to be introduced in 2027. Air Passenger Duty currently continues to apply for airports in Scotland and HMRC has continued to administer APD in relation to flights in Scotland.

=== Reserved taxes ===
Many aspects of taxation collected in Scotland, nonetheless, remain reserved to His Majesty's Government, and are collected by HM Revenue & Customs (HMRC). These include:

- Income tax (savings and dividend income and the Personal Allowance)
- Value-added tax
- National Insurance
- Fuel duty
- Insurance Premium Tax
- Climate Change Levy
- Bingo Duty
- Corporation tax
- Capital gains tax
- Inheritance tax
- Motoring taxation

== See also ==
- Blanch fee
- Buttock mail
- Court of Exchequer (Scotland)
- Edinburgh congestion charge
- Full fiscal autonomy for Scotland
- Government Expenditure and Revenue Scotland
- Income tax in Scotland
- Local income tax in Scotland
- Taxation in the United Kingdom
- Teind
- Window tax
