= Air Departure Tax =

Air Departure Tax (Scotland) Act 2017
- Act of the Scottish Parliament
- Scottish Parliament
- Long title: An Act of the Scottish Parliament to make provision for a tax on the carriage of passengers by air from airports in Scotland.
- Citation: 2017 asp 2

Dates
- Royal assent: 25 July 2017

Status: Not yet in force

Text of statute as originally enacted

Text of the Air Departure Tax (Scotland) Act 2017 as in force today (including any amendments) within the United Kingdom, from legislation.gov.uk.

Air Departure Tax (ADT) is a pending tax which will replace the UK-wide Air Passenger Duty in Scotland. The Air Departure Tax (Scotland) Act 2017 (asp 2) provides the statutory basis for the tax, which was originally expected to apply from 1 April 2018. Implementation was delayed and the tax will now be introduced on 1 April 2027.

== History ==
On 20 June 2017, the Air Departure Tax (Scotland) Act 2017 was passed in the Scottish Parliament and received royal assent on 25 July 2017 and was meant to be introduced on 1 April 2018. However, on 22 November 2017, the UK and Scottish ministers agreed to delay the introduction of ADT until issues have been resolved regarding the tax exemption for flights departing airports in the Highlands and Islands of Scotland.

In June 2018, the Scottish Government and UK Government agreed that it would not be possible to introduce the ADT in April 2019. Air Passenger Duty has continued to apply for airports in Scotland and HMRC has continued to administer APD in relation to flights in Scotland.

On 13 January 2026, it was announced that an alternative to maintain an exemption for the Highlands and Islands from the tax had been designed. The tax will now apply from 1 April 2027.

== Rate ==
The Scottish Government intended to reduce the rate by 50%, and eventually abolish it completely once finances allowed. This caused concern that such a move could damage tourism in England. However, in 2019 the Scottish Government abandoned its plans to cut Air Departure Tax as the proposals were no longer considered compatible with Scotland's climate change targets.

== See also ==
- Taxation in Scotland
- Tourism in Scotland
