= Aggregates Levy =

UK tax on commercial exploitation of rock, sand, and gravel

The Aggregates Levy is a tax levied on the commercial exploitation of rock, sand, and gravel in the United Kingdom.

== History ==
The introduction of a levy on the commercial exploitation of aggregates in the UK was announced in March 2000 at the 2000 United Kingdom budget, and was legislated for by part 2 of the Finance Act 2001. Collection of the levy began on 1 April 2002.

Revenues were initially placed into the Aggregates Levy Sustainability Fund until March 2011, when the fund was scrapped. The tax is intended to promote the use of recycled aggregate.

In Scotland it was replaced by the devolved Scottish Aggregates Tax from 1 April 2026.

== Levy rate and receipts ==
Taxable aggregate has been taxed at a rate of 2.16 pounds sterling per tonne since 1 April 2026.

Aggregates Levy rates
Period	Rate (£ per tonne)
1 April 2002–31 March 2008	1.60
1 April 2008–31 March 2009	1.95
1 April 2009–31 March 2024	2.00
1 April 2024–31 March 2025	2.03
1 April 2025–31 March 2026	2.08
since 1 April 2026	2.16

Aggregates Levy receipts
Tax year	Receipts (£)
2002–03	247,000,000
2003–04	339,000,000
2004–05	334,000,000
2005–06	326,000,000
2006–07	321,000,000
2007–08	339,000,000
2008–09	334,000,000
2009–10	275,000,000
2010–11	288,000,000
2011–12	290,000,000
2012–13	265,000,000
2013–14	285,000,000
2014–15	342,000,000
2015–16	356,000,000
2016–17	407,000,000
2017–18	376,000,000
2018–19	367,000,000
2019–20	397,000,000
2020–21	359,000,000
