= Housing in Scotland =

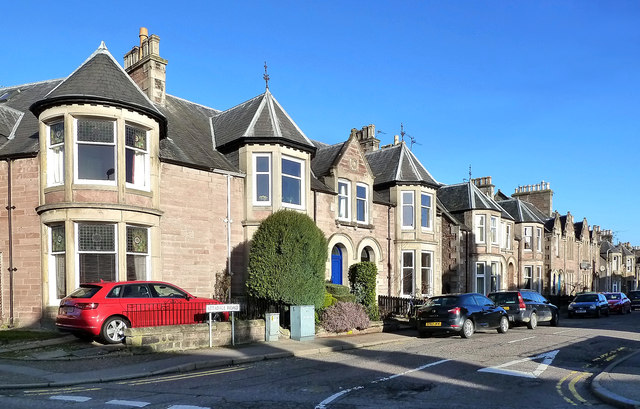
Housing in Inverness

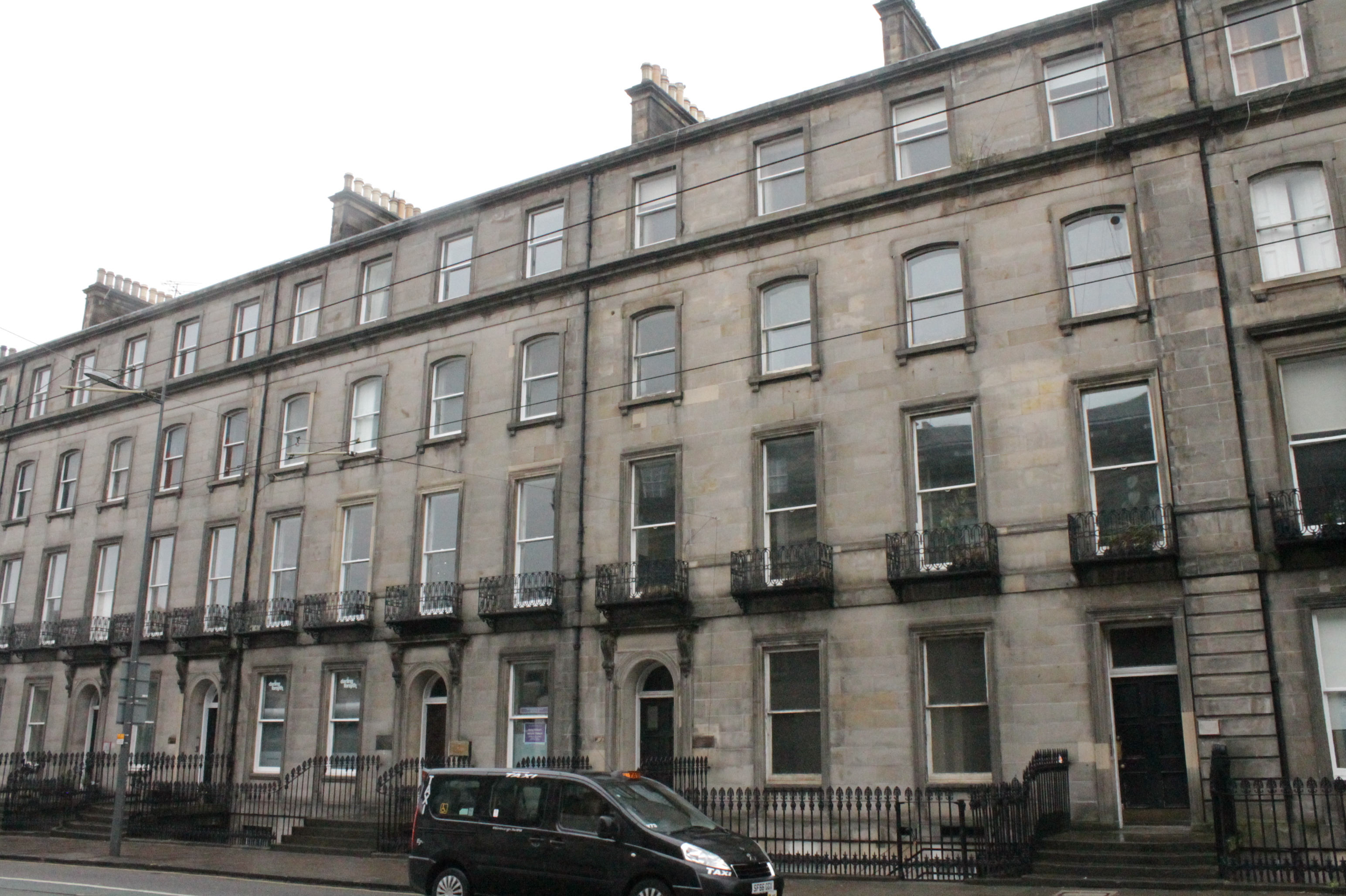
Tenement housing in Edinburgh

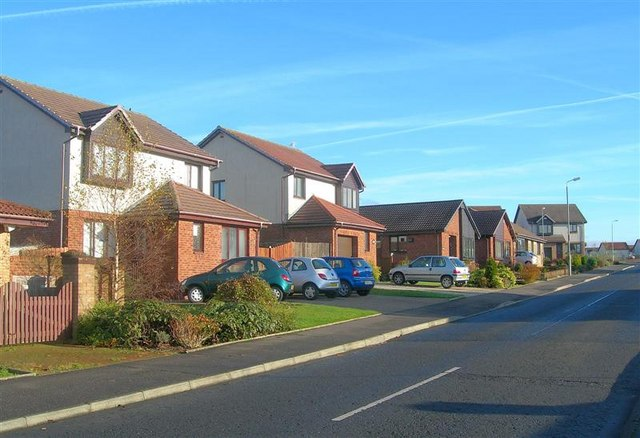
New private housing in Coylton, South Ayrshire

Housing in Scotland includes all forms of built habitation in what is now Scotland, from the earliest period of human occupation to the present day. The oldest house in Scotland dates from the Mesolithic era. In the Neolithic era settled farming led to the construction of the first stone houses. There is also evidence from this period of large timber halls. In the Bronze Age there were cellular round crannogs (built on artificial islands) and hillforts that enclosed large settlements. In the Iron Age cellular houses begin to be replaced on the northern isles by simple Atlantic roundhouses, substantial circular buildings with a drystone construction. The largest constructions that date from this era are the circular brochs and duns and wheelhouses.

After the First World War, the government responded to urban deprivation with a massive programme of council house building. Many were on greenfield sites of semi-detached homes or terraced cottages. In the 1930s, schemes tended to be more cheaply built, but a survey of 1936 found that almost half of Scotland's houses were still inadequate. There was also extensive private building of sub-urban "bungalow belts", particularly around Edinburgh. From the mid-twentieth century, public architecture became more utilitarian, as part of the impulse to produce a comprehensive welfare state and the influence of modernism. As the post-war desire for urban regeneration gained momentum it would focus on the tower block.

Another solution adopted in Scotland was the building of new towns like Glenrothes and Cumbernauld. Initially praised, they were receiving heavy criticism by the twenty-first century. The creation of Scottish Homes in 1989 increased the stock of private housing and reducing the role of the state sector and the direction of planning by local authorities. The 1980s saw the growth of speculative house building by developers, many introducing English brick and half-timbered vernacular styles to Scotland. Sales of council houses were also popular. There have been increasing attempts to preserve much of what survives from Scotland's architectural heritage and programmes of urban regeneration resulting in a return of resident populations to major urban centres. By 2011, there were 2.37 million households, of which over sixty per cent were owner occupied. The number of single occupied households increased since 2001, largely accounting for an increase in the number of households. The devolved Scottish government took a distinct perspective on homelessness, making accommodation a right for the voluntarily homeless.

== Prehistory ==
=== Stone Age ===
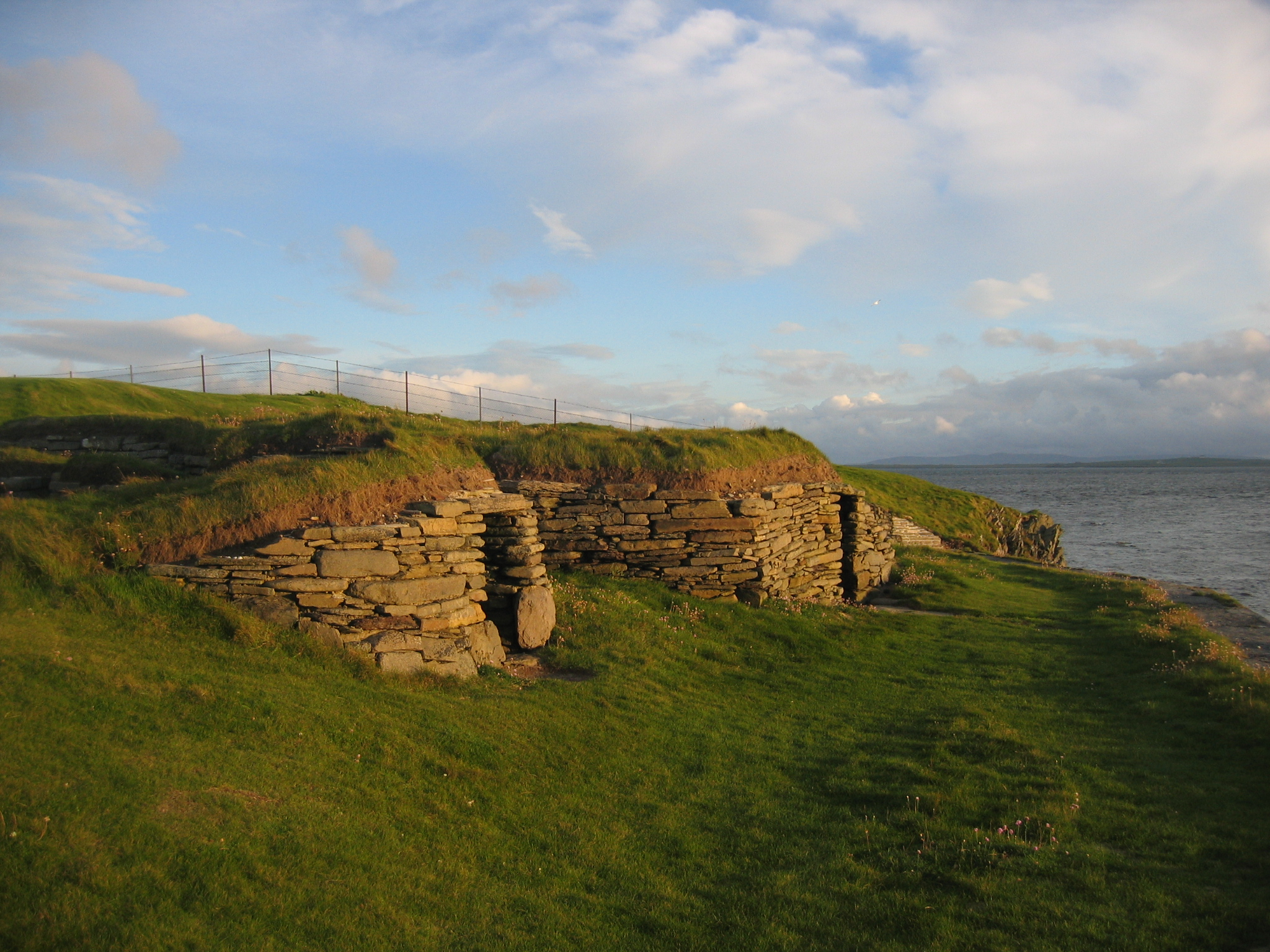
The stone building at Knap of Howar, Orkney, one of the oldest surviving houses in north-west Europe

The oldest house for which there is evidence in Scotland is the oval structure of wooden posts found at South Queensferry near the Firth of Forth, dating from the Mesolithic period, about 8240 BCE. The earliest stone structures are probably the three hearths found at Jura, dated to about 6000 BCE. With the development of agriculture, groups of settlers began building stone houses on what is now Scottish soil in the Neolithic era, around 6,000 years ago, and the first villages around 500 years later. Neolithic habitation sites are particularly common and well-preserved in the Northern and Western Isles, where a lack of trees led to most structures being built of local stone. The stone building at Knap of Howar at Papa Westray, Orkney is one of the oldest surviving houses in north-west Europe, making use of locally gathered rubble in a dry stone construction, it was probably occupied for 900 years, between 3700 and 2800 BCE. Skara Brae on the Mainland of Orkney also dates from this era, occupied from about 3100 to 2500 BCE and is Europe's most complete Neolithic village. From the Neolithic era there is evidence of timber halls. These are probably unique to Scotland and were massive roofed buildings made of oak, all of which seem to have been subsequently burnt down. There is debate as to the role of these buildings, which have been seen variously as regular farming homesteads of Neolithic families and as related to a series of monumental constructions such as barrows. The hall at Balbridie, Aberdeenshire was 85 feet (26 m) long, 43 feet (13 m) wide and may have had a roof 30 feet (9 m) high, making it large enough to accommodate up to 50 people.

=== Bronze Age ===
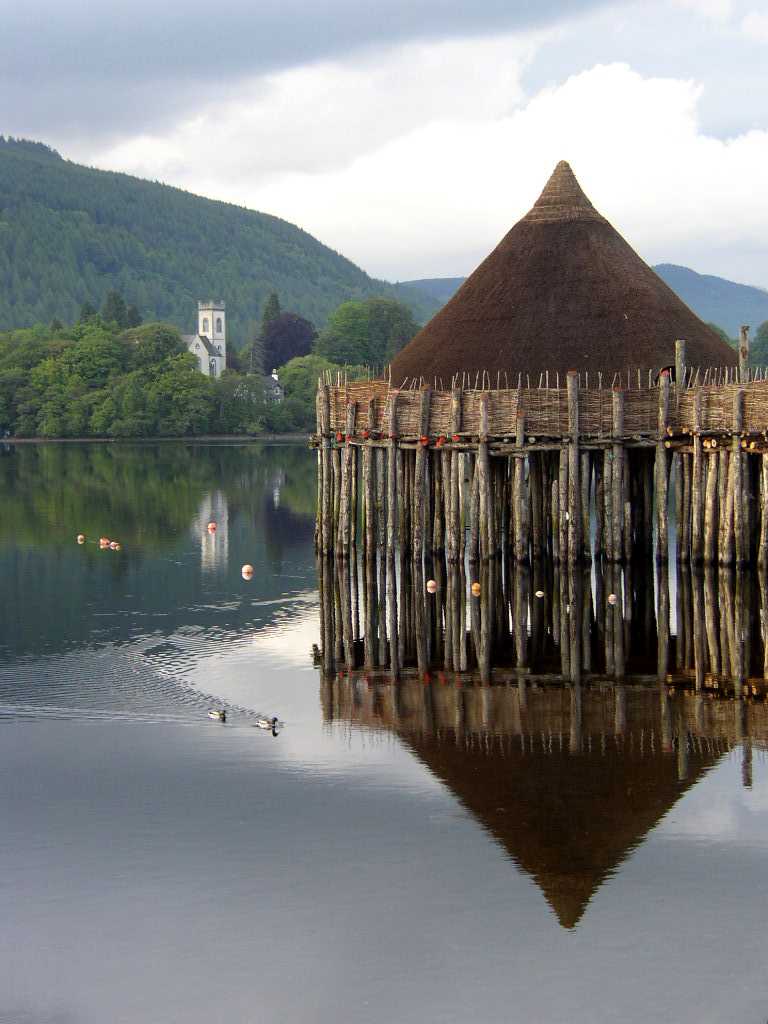
Reconstructed crannog on Loch Tay

As bronze working developed from about 2000 BCE, there was a decline in the building of large new structures, which, with a reduction of the total area under cultivation, suggests a fall in population. From the Early and Middle Bronze Age there is evidence of cellular roundhouses of stone, as at Jarlshof and Sumburgh in Shetland. At Jarlshof these are oval houses with thick stone walls, which may have been partly subterranean at the earliest period of inhabitation, a technique that provided both structural stability and insulation. There is also evidence of the occupation of crannogs, roundhouses partially or entirely built on artificial islands, usually in lakes, rivers and estuarine waters. They were often constructed of layers of brushwood and rubble. Sometimes they were revetted around the edges with vertical piles and sometimes surfaced with logs of oak. As elsewhere in Europe, hillforts were first introduced in this period, including the occupation of Eildon hill near Melrose in the Scottish Borders, from around 1000 BCE, which accommodated several hundred houses on a fortified hilltop, and Traprain Law in East Lothian, which had a 20-acre enclosure, sectioned in two places west of the summit, made up of a coursed, stone wall with a rubble core.

=== Iron Age ===
In the early Iron Age, from the seventh century BCE, cellular houses begin to be replaced on the northern isles by simple Atlantic roundhouses, substantial circular buildings with a dry stone construction. Important examples are at Quanterness, Bu, Pierowall, and Tofts Ness on Orkney, and at Clickimin in Shetland. From about 400 BCE more complex Atlantic roundhouses began to be built, as at Howe, Orkney and Crosskirk, Caithness. The largest constructions that date from this era are the circular broch towers, probably dating from about 200 BCE. Most ruins only survive up to a few metres above ground level, although there are five extant examples of towers whose walls still exceed 21 feet (6 m) in height. There are at least 100 broch sites in Scotland. Despite extensive research, their purpose and the nature of the societies that created them are still a matter of debate. Archaeologists since the 1960s have distinguished brochs from smaller structures of similar construction, usually called duns. The heaviest evidence of the occupation of crannogs was in this era, but they would continue to be used until the Middle Ages. This period also saw the beginnings of wheelhouses, a roundhouse with a characteristic outer wall, within which was a circle of stone piers (bearing a resemblance to the spokes of a wheel), but these would flourish most in the era of Roman occupation. There is evidence for about 1,000 Iron Age hillforts in Scotland, most located below the Clyde-Forth line. The majority are circular, with a single palisade around an enclosure. They appear to have been largely abandoned in the Roman period, but some seem to have been reoccupied after their departure.

== Middle Ages ==
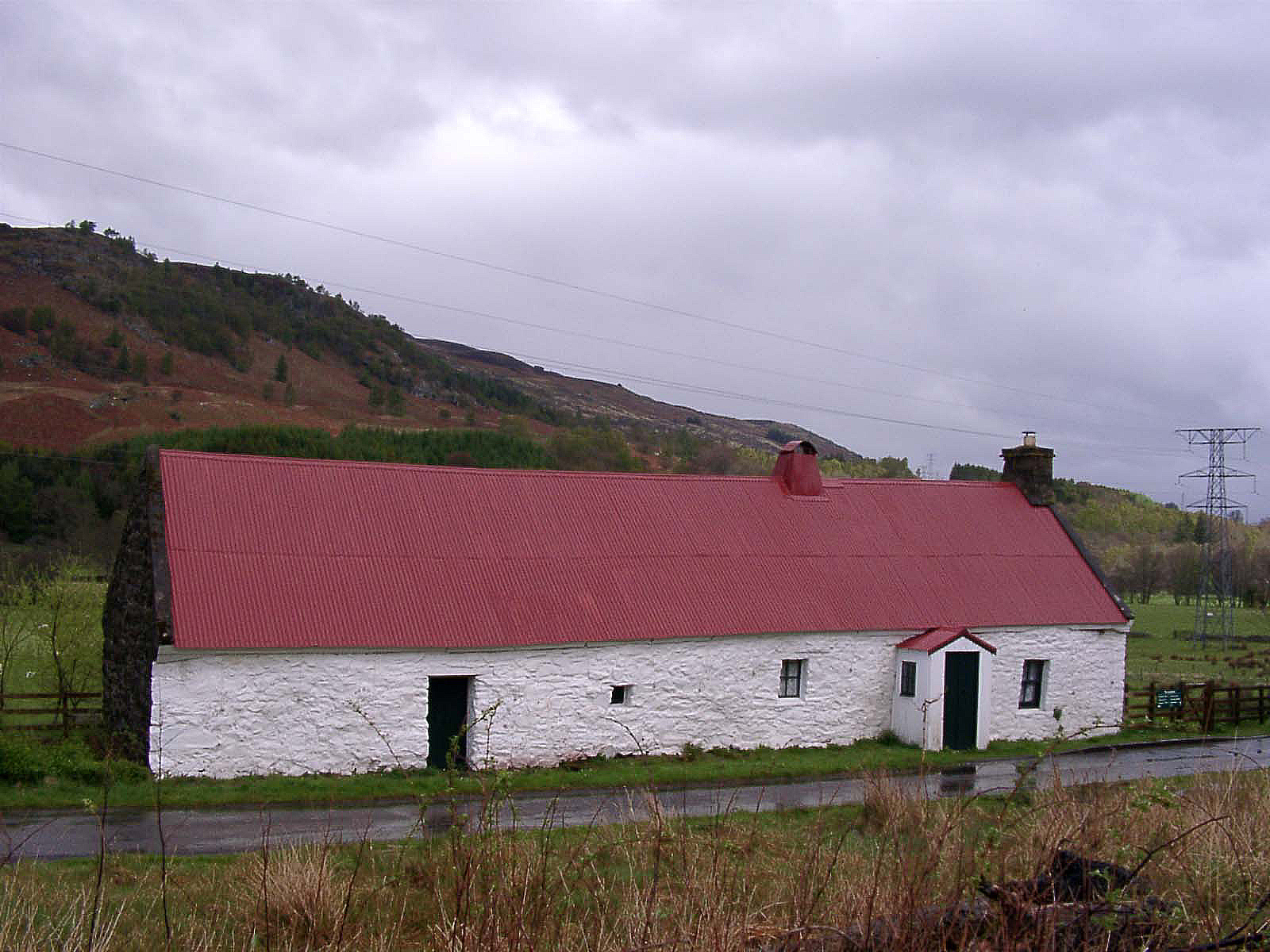
The Moirlanich Longhouse, a byre dwelling built in the nineteenth century in the traditional manner with a cruck frame

=== Rural houses ===
Very few rural houses have survived from the Medieval era in Scotland. As in England, cruck construction was used, employing pairs of curved timbers to support the roof, however, unlike in England, they were usually hidden from view. The major timbers often belonged to the local laird and were known as "master's wood" or "master's timbers" and were often reused. The responsibility for infilling the walls usually belonged to the tenants. There was extensive use of turf to fill in the walls, sometimes on a stone base, but they were not long lasting and had to be rebuilt perhaps as often as every two or three years. In some regions, including the south-west and around Dundee, solid clay walls were used, or combinations of clay, turf and straw, rendered with clay or lime to make them weatherproof. With a lack of long span structural timber, the most common building material was stone, employed in both mortared and dry stone construction. Different regions used broom, heather, straw, turfs or reeds for roofing. Central to most houses was the hearth. The simplest were in the centre of the floor, with smoke exiting through a hole in the roof and this form tended to be used longer in the Highlands. More developed forms had a backstone of a single flagstone or walling. There is evidence of Lowland houses with canopies for smoke extraction.

=== Burghs ===
From the twelfth century, burghs, towns that were granted certain legal privileges from the crown, developed, particularly on the east coast. They were typically surrounded by a palisade or had a castle and usually had a market place, with a widened high street or junction, often marked by a mercat cross, beside houses for the nobles, burgesses and other significant inhabitants, which were often built in a relatively elaborate style and by the end of the period some would have slate roofs or tiles. Very little has survived of the houses of the urban poor. They were probably largely located in the backlands, away from the main street frontages. From Aberdeen and Perth there is evidence of nearly forty buildings dating from the twelfth to the fourteenth centuries, with walls of planks or wattles.

== Early modern ==
=== Rural settlement ===
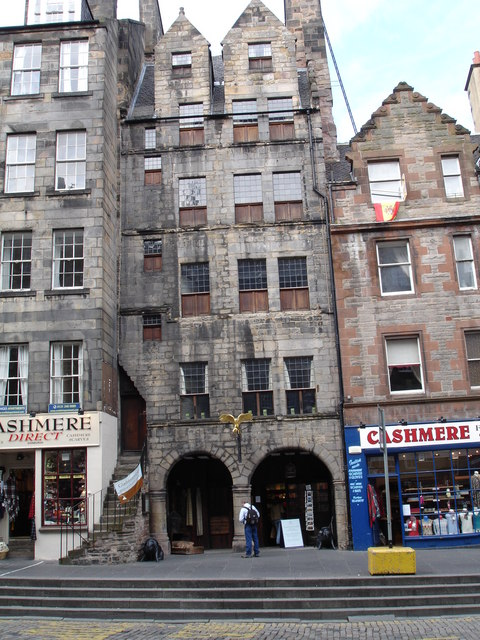
The six story Gladstone's Land, Edinburgh, demonstrating the tendency to build up in the growing burghs

Most of the early modern population, in both the Lowlands and Highlands, was housed in small hamlets and isolated dwellings. Most farming was based on the lowland fermtoun or highland baile, settlements of a handful of families that jointly farmed an area notionally suitable for two or three plough teams. As the population expanded, some of these settlements were sub-divided to create new hamlets and more marginal land was settled, with sheilings (clusters of huts occupied while summer pasture was being used for grazing), becoming permanent settlements. The standard layout of a house throughout Scotland before agricultural improvement was a byre-dwelling or longhouse or blackhouse with humans and livestock sharing a common roof, often separated by only a partition wall, leading to the byre (barn) Contemporaries noted that cottages in the Highlands and Islands tended to be cruder, with single rooms, slit windows and earthen floors, often shared by a large family. In contrast, many Lowland cottages had distinct rooms and chambers, were clad with plaster or paint and even had glazed windows.

=== Urban settlement ===
By the sixteenth century perhaps ten per cent of the population lived in one of the many burghs. A characteristic of Scottish burghs were long main streets of tall buildings, with vennels, wynds and alleys leading off it, many of which survive today. Many houses in Scottish towns had forms derived from those in major urban centres in Tuscany and the Low Countries, although realised with traditional Scottish techniques and materials. Timber-framed houses were common across urban centres in Europe, but, perhaps because of the shortage of large timbers and an abundance of workable stone in Scotland, houses with only timber fronts were more common. Despite the logistical problems timbered houses enjoyed a resurgence in the late sixteenth century, particularly in Edinburgh where there were large numbers of board, jettied and boarded construction. Increasingly half-timbered houses occurred beside the larger, stone and slate-roofed town houses of merchants and the urban gentry. By the late seventeenth century these had taken on a recognisably Flemish or Dutch appearance. They were often narrow, with four stories, gabled and crow stepped, but often built in stone and harl. They sometimes had ground floor arcades or piazzas. Most wooden thatched houses have not survived, but stone houses of the period can be seen in Edinburgh at Lady Stair's House, Acheson House and the six-story Gladstone's Land, an early example of the tendency to build upward in the increasingly crowded towns, producing horizontally divided tenements.

== Improvement and Industrial Revolution ==
=== Agricultural improvement ===
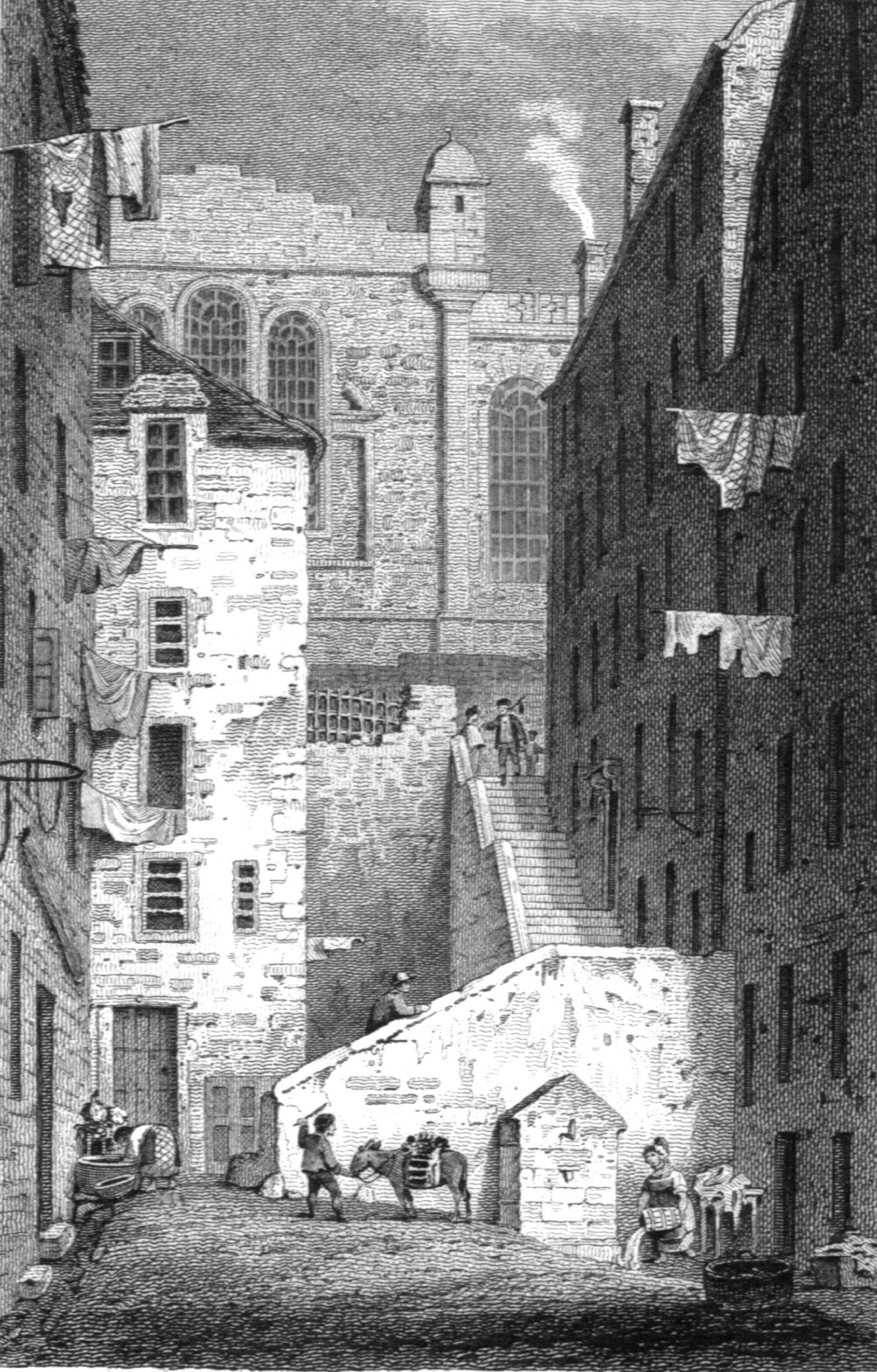
The rear of tenements at the back of the Parliament House, shown in 1820

In the eighteenth century there was a conscious attempt to improve agriculture among the gentry and nobility. The Society of Improvers was founded in 1723, including in its 300 members dukes, earls, lairds and landlords. Enclosures began to displace the runrig system and free pasture. New farm buildings, often based on designs in patterns books, replaced the fermtoun, and regional diversity was replaced with a standardisation of building forms. Smaller farms retained the linear outline of the longhouse, with dwelling house, barn and byre in a row, but in larger farms a three- or four-sided layout became common, separating the dwelling house from barns and servants quarters. Hundreds of thousands of cottars and tenant farmers from central and southern Scotland were forcibly moved from the farms and small holdings their families had occupied for hundreds of years. Many small settlements were dismantled. Of those that remained many were now crofters: poor families living on "crofts"—very small rented farms with indefinite tenure used to raise various crops and animals, with kelping, fishing, spinning of linen and military service as important sources of revenue. Many lived in blackhouses with double thickness walls about 6 feet (2 m) high, made of local stone and packed with rubble and earth and thatched with reeds. They were unfaced inside and were usually warmed by a peat fire on a slab floor, the smoke from which gave them their name. Others were forced either to the new purpose-built villages built by the landowners such as John Cockburn at Ormiston and Archibald Grant's Monymusk, to the new industrial centres of Glasgow, Edinburgh, northern England, or to Canada or the United States.

=== Urban growth ===
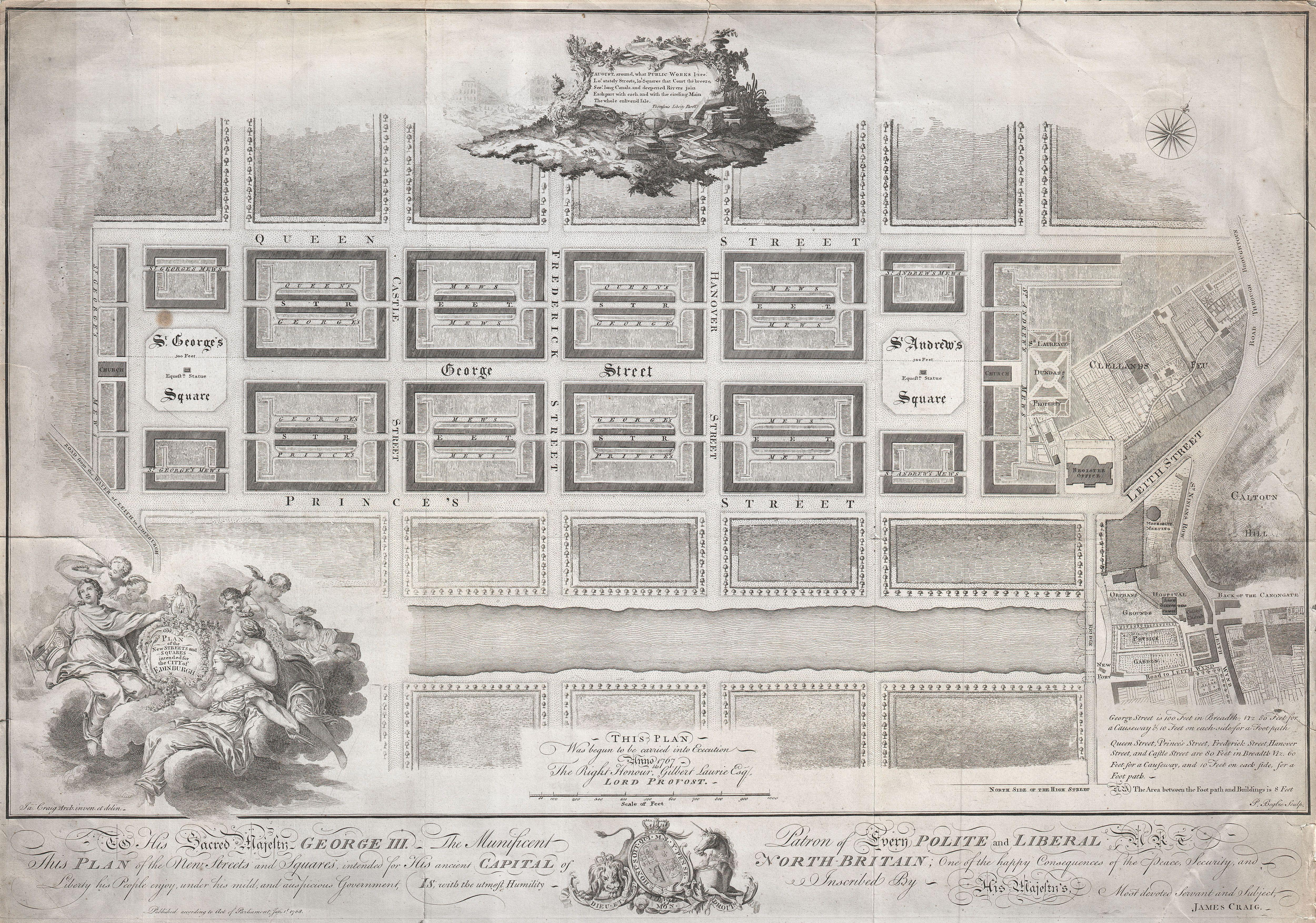
Gridiron plan for the New Town by James Craig (1768)

The Industrial Revolution transformed the scale of Scottish towns. In Edinburgh classicism, together with its reputation as a major centre of the Enlightenment, resulted in the city being nicknamed "The Athens of the North". In the second half of the eighteenth century a New Town of classically inspired buildings was laid out according to a plan drawn up by James Craig. This gridiron plan, building forms and the architectural detailing would be copied by many smaller towns throughout Scotland, although rendered in locally quarried materials.

With industrialisation Glasgow became the "second city of the Empire", growing from a population of 77,385 in 1801 to 274,324 by 1841. Between 1780 and 1830 three middle class "new towns" were laid out on gridiron plans, similar to those in Edinburgh, to the south and west of the old town. The other side of increasing wealth and planned architecture for the aristocracy and middle classes was the growth of urban sprawl. In Glasgow, the growing workforce was left to the mercy of market forces as sub-urban tenements were thrown up, particularly to the east of the city, like those of the Gorbals to the south, where overcrowding, lack of sanitation and general poverty contributed to disease, crime, and very low life expediency.

Urban centres increasing made use of locally mined stone. While Edinburgh made extensive use of yellow sandstone, the commercial centre and tenements of Glasgow were built in distinctive red sandstone. After a major fire in the largely wooden Aberdeen in the 1740s, the city fathers decreed that major buildings should be in the locally abundant granite, beginning a new phase in large-scale mining and leading to the "granite city", becoming a centre of a major industry in the nineteenth century, which supplied Scotland and England with faced stone, pavement slabs and pillars.

=== New towns ===
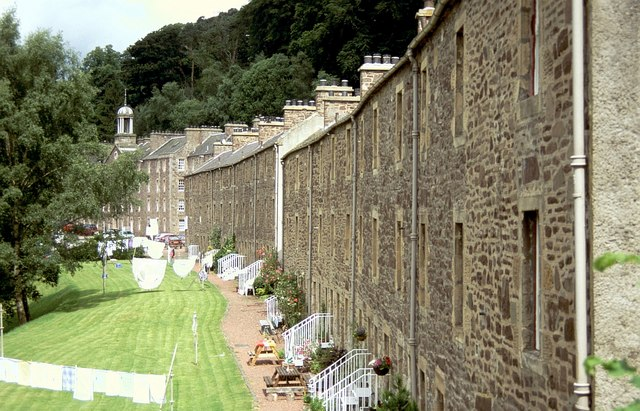
Housing for workers at New Lanark

The sometimes utopian concept of the new town, aimed at improving society through the foundation of architecturally designed communities, was an important part of Scottish thinking from the mid-eighteenth to the twentieth century. In addition to the new towns of Edinburgh and Glasgow, these included the complete rebuilding of Inverary for John Campbell, 5th Duke of Argyll by John Adam and Robert Mylne, between 1772 and 1800. Helensburgh near Glasgow was laid out in 1776 on a gridiron plan. From 1800, Robert Owen's New Lanark, designed as a self-contained community, combining industry with ordered and improved living conditions, was an important milestone in the historical development of urban planning.

Scotland also produced one of the major figures in urban planning in sociologist Patrick Geddes (1854–1932), who developed the concept of conurbation, and discarded the idea of "sweeping clearances" to remove existing housing and the imposition of the gridiron plan, in favour of "conservative surgery": retaining the best buildings in an area and removing the worst. He put this into practice, purchasing and improving slum tenements in James Court, and in new developments at Ramsay Garden, Edinburgh.

== Twentieth century ==
=== Council housing and slum clearance ===
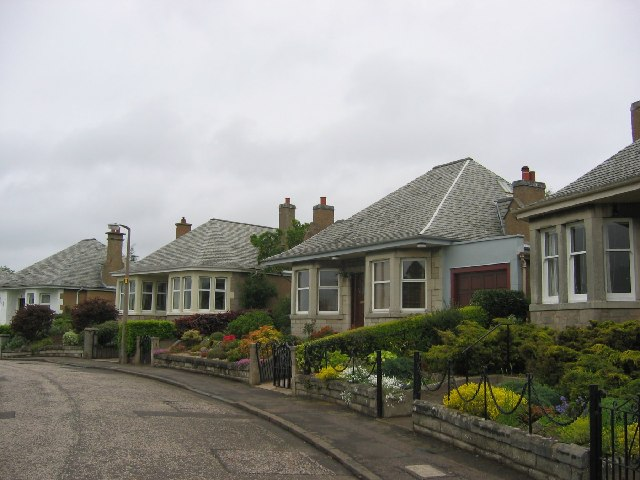
Bungalows in Comiston: typical of the suburban low density housing around Edinburgh

In the twentieth century the distinctive Scottish use of stone architecture declined as it was replaced by cheaper alternatives such as Portland cement, concrete, and mass-production brick. Stone would however be retained as a material for some housing stock in Edinburgh, Aberdeen and Dumfries, and would undergo revivals. During the First World War, the government became increasingly aware of Scotland's housing problems, particularly after the Glasgow rent strike of 1915. A royal commission of 1917 reported on the "unspeakably filthy privy-middens in many of the mining areas, badly constructed incurably damp labourers' cottages on farms, whole townships unfit for human occupation in the crofting counties and islands ... groups of lightless and unventilated houses in the older burghs, clotted masses of slums in the great cities". The result was a massive programme of council house building. In 1914, 90 per cent of housing stock was in private hands, but by 1981 public sector housing would be peak at 55 per cent (compared with 29.1 per cent in England and Wales). Many early council houses were built on greenfield sites away from the pollution of the city, often constructed of semi-detached homes or terraced cottages. Knightswood, north-west of Glasgow, was built as a show piece from 1923 to 1929, with a library, social centre and seven shopping "parades". In 1937 the Scottish Special Housing Association (SSHA) was established to develop housing for economic growth, but most schemes depended on local initiatives.

In the 1930s, schemes tended to be more cheaply built, like Blackhill, Glasgow, with a thousand houses built as two and three storey tenements. These building schemes were designed to rehouse those displaced by urban slum clearance, by which thousands of tenements were demolished. However, often crammed into poor land near railways or gasworks, they soon became notorious. A survey of 1936 found that almost half of Scotland's houses were still inadequate. Residents tended to prefer low-rise solutions to rehousing and there was extensive private building of sub-urban "bungalow belts", particularly around Edinburgh, laid out with squares and crescents. They helped make the fortunes of builders including Miller Homes, Ford and Torrie and Mactaggart and Mickel.

=== Post-war planning ===
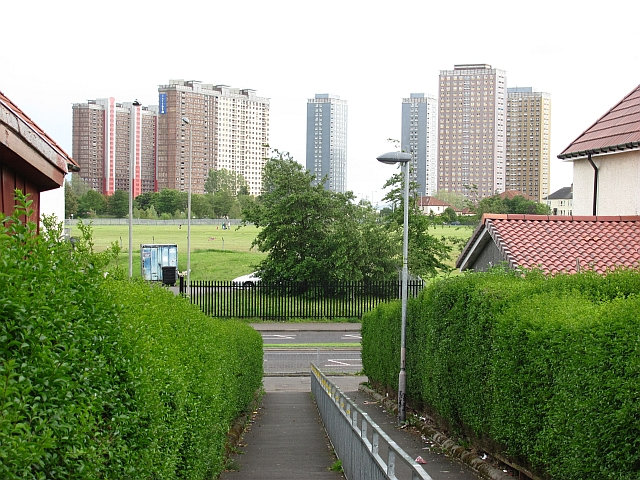
The eight towers of the Red Road Flats, Glasgow

From the mid-twentieth century, public architecture became more utilitarian, as part of the impulse to produce a comprehensive welfare state and the influence of Modernism. The main thrust of post-war planning was in clearance and rebuilding. The process began in Paisley, where from 1955 the populations of districts were decanted, the buildings demolished and rebuilding began. The result in the first district, George Street/ Canal Street, were low flats built in render and reused rubble around landscaped courtyards, with a 15-storey tower at one end. As the post-war desire for urban regeneration gained momentum it would focus on the tower block, championed in Glasgow by David Gibson, convener of the city housing committee. Projects like the brutalist Red Road Flats (1964–69) originally offered hope of a new beginning and an escape from the overcrowded nineteenth-century tenements of the city, but lacked a sufficient infrastructure and soon deteriorated. They also made extensive use of asbestos as a fire retardant, leading to long-term health problems for builders and residents. Robert Matthew (1906–75) and Basil Spence (1907–76) were responsible for redeveloping the Gorbals in Glasgow.

Another solution adopted in Scotland was the building of new towns like Glenrothes (1948) and Cumbernauld (1956), designed to take excess population from the cities. These used a new low, dense pattern of community design, with terraced cottages and low flats. Cumbernauld was praised for its architecture when first built, but the uncompleted centre and the layout of the town in general, were receiving heavy criticism by the twenty-first century: its modernist architecture described by one resident as "the lego fantasy of an unhappy child". The brutalist tendency in comprehensive Scottish urban planning would be derided by critics for its "tabula rasa planning" and "architect's arrogance". The introduction of the Housing (Scotland) Act 1988 merged the SSHA with the Scottish Housing Association to form Scottish Homes, which had duty to provide housing stock, but did not retain possession, reducing the role of the state sector and the overall direction of planning by local authorities.

=== Private building and urban renewal ===
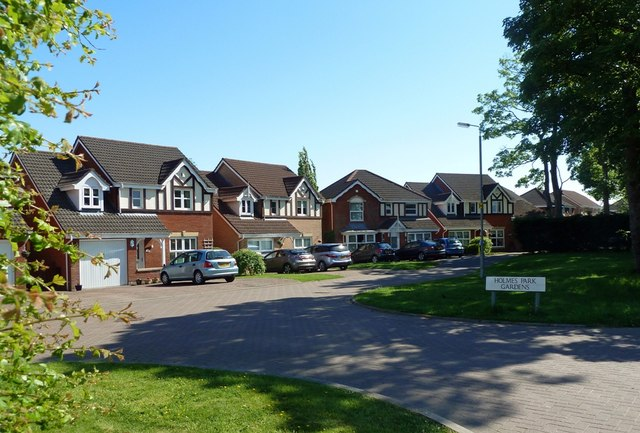
Private housing development at Holmes Park Gardens in Kilmarnock

The drive to use housing to transform and reorder society subsided in the 1970s. The 1980s saw the growth of speculative house building by developers. These introduced English brick and half-timbered vernacular styles to Scotland, which had been largely unknown before this period. Many were small and built to minimum standards with little regard to energy or environmental issues. Sales of council houses were popular in Scotland and until the mid-1990s, unlike in England, local authorities could use the whole of their capital receipts for development, including the building of new houses. Under the Scottish Parliament, Scottish Homes was abolished and replaced by Communities Scotland in 2001, which had a responsibility to provide affordable housing and environmental improvement. On 31 October 2007 Nicola Sturgeon, the Cabinet Secretary for Health and Wellbeing, announced that she had decided to abolish Communities Scotland as a separate agency and bring its main non-regulatory functions into the core Scottish Government. She confirmed that its regulatory functions would be reformed to operate outside the Government and independently of Ministers. The Scottish Housing Regulator is responsible for the regulation of social landlords in Scotland. The Regulator's statutory objective is to protect the interests of tenants, people who are homeless, and others who use social landlords' services.

There have been increasing attempts to preserve much of what survives from Scotland's architectural heritage, including the great buildings and monuments, and the classically influenced houses of towns such as Edinburgh and Glasgow. There have also been attempts at preserving the surviving Glasgow tenements, many of which have been renovated, restored to their original pink and honeyed sandstone from the black fronts created by pollution and brought up to modern standards of accommodation. Urban regeneration has also been attempted in areas of post-industrial decline, such as the Merchant City in Glasgow, which was returned to housing from the 1980s, with warehouse loft conversions and more recently the waterfront in Edinburgh, resulting in a return of resident populations to major urban centres.

=== Supported housing ===
Supported housing in Scotland, such as sheltered housing, extra care provision, retirement housing, supported or assisted living accommodation and temporary or emergency accommodation, is commissioned by individual local authorities. Local authorities, registered social landlords, private companies, voluntary organisations and health and social care partnerships are all involved in providing supported housing.

== Modern households ==
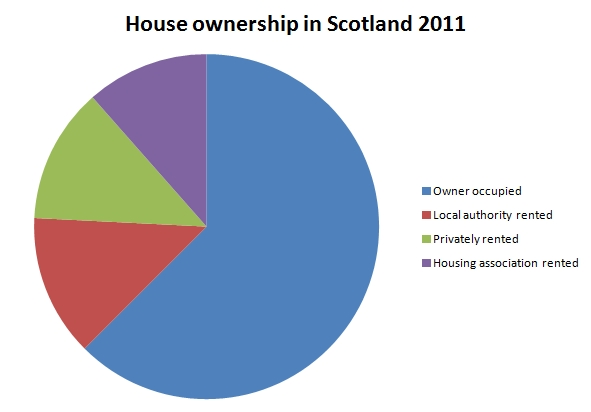
Pie chart showing forms of house ownership in Scotland based on the 2011 census

In 2011, there were estimated to be 2.37 million households in Scotland. Of these approximately 1.5 million (62.5 per cent) were owner-occupied homes, 319,000 (12.7 per cent) homes rented from local authorities, 305,000 (11.5 per cent) privately rented homes, and 277,000 (11.5 per cent) homes rented from housing associations. The total number had increased by around 173,000 (7.9 per cent) over the previous ten years, with the rate of increase having slowed substantially since the start of the economic downturn in 2007. The rate of growth in households was affected by falls in new housing supply (which includes new builds, refurbishments and conversions). This fell in each year from 2008–09 to 2010–11, from around 27,600 units in 2007–08 to 17,100 units in 2010–11. The number of households increased after 2010 in every local authority except Clackmannanshire, Inverclyde and West Dunbartonshire. The area with the greatest increase since 2001 in percentage terms was Aberdeenshire with an additional 13,800 households (15.2 per cent). Edinburgh City saw the largest absolute increase of 17,000 households (8.3 per cent). Overall 2.8 per cent of dwellings are vacant and 1.5 per cent are second homes, with the largest proportions in rural areas.

The average household size has decreased, with more people living alone or in smaller households. Between 2005 and 2010, the number of households containing just one adult increased by five per cent and the number of two adult households increased by eight per cent, while the number of households containing one adult fell by 11 per cent and the number of households containing two or more adults with children fell by three per cent. The number of households containing three or more adults increased by 11 per cent. These changes in household composition contributed to a four per cent increase in the number of households in Scotland between 2005 and 2010, which was higher than the increase in the population over this time (2.5 per cent).

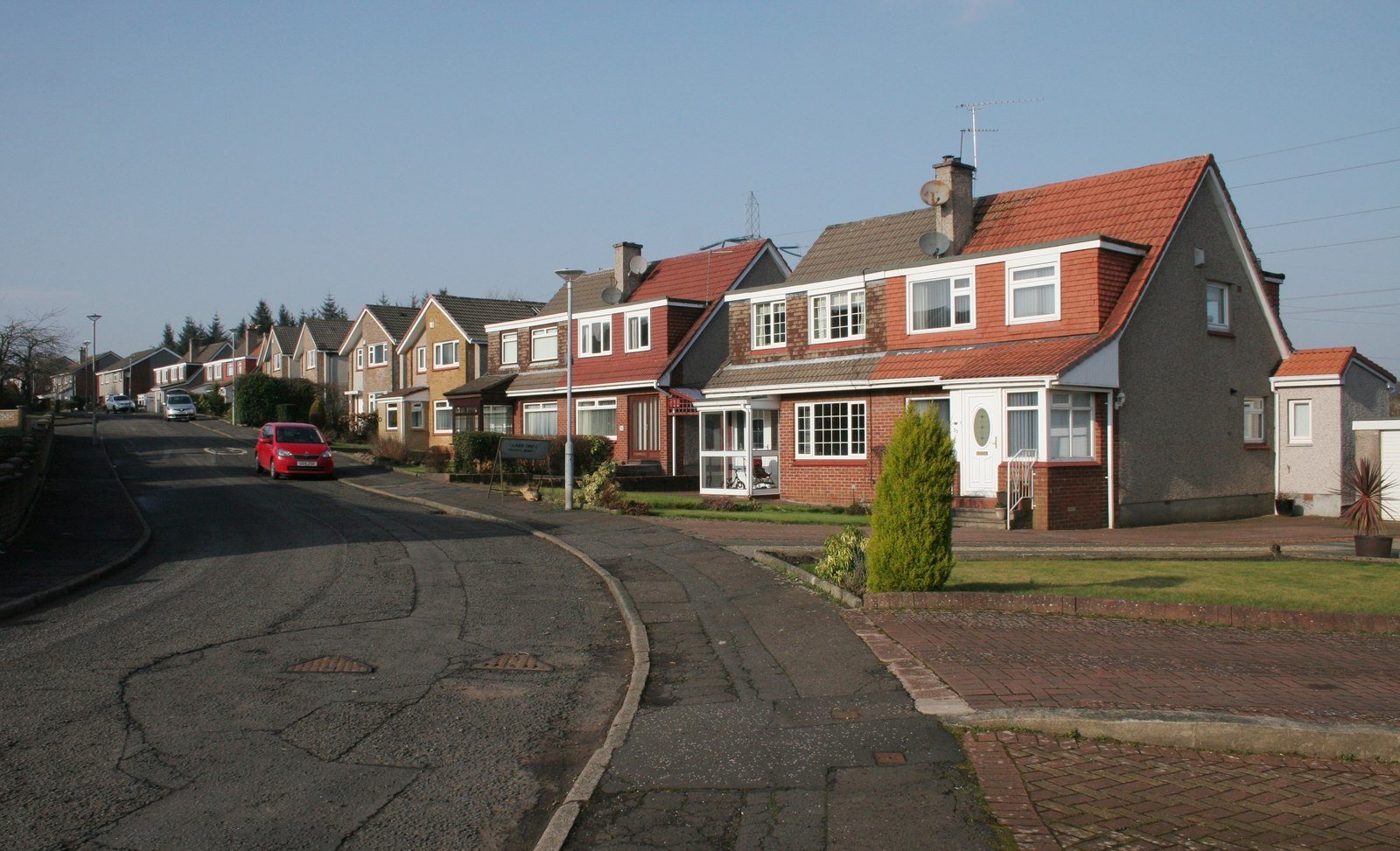
Housing in Renfrewshire

Since the establishment of a separate Scottish Parliament and devolved government in 1999, there has been a response to homelessness in Scotland that has been distinctive from the rest of the UK, described as a "rights-based approach". The 2001 Housing (Scotland) Act required local authorities to house homeless people while claims of priority need were investigated. Even if applicants were found not to be in priority need, councils were required to provide accommodation for a reasonable period. The 2003 Homelessness (Scotland) Act went further in phasing out the distinction between priority and non-priority need, so that by 2012 all people unintentionally homeless would be entitled to a permanent home. Partly as a result of these changing definitions, the number of applications for assistance assessed as in priority need increased from 20,000 in 2000–01 to 34,940 in 2008–09. The number of households in temporary accommodation also increased in from 4,600 in 2002 to 10,815 by 2010. Some local authorities expressed concerns that they would be unable to meet expanding demand from existing permanent accommodation. From 2012 to 2013 the number of people seeking help for homelessness fell by 11 per cent to 9,474. The number of people made homeless or threatened with homelessness fell by a tenth to 7,649. The number of people in temporary accommodation was about 6 per cent lower than the peak period in early 2011 when temporary placements were in excess of 12,000. The 2,821 households with children in temporary accommodation was a decrease of 472 households (14 per cent) from the previous year. These households contained a total of 4,574 children, a decrease of 727 children (14 per cent).

== See also ==
- Housing in Glasgow
- Rent control in Scotland
- Short assured tenancy (Scotland)
- Scottish Housing News
- Affordable housing by country
