= Scottish housing =

Scottish housing may refer to:

- Housing in Scotland
- Scottish Housing Regulator
