= Communities Scotland =

Former executive agency of the Scottish Government

Communities Scotland was an executive agency of the Scottish Government from 2001 to 2008. The Agency was responsible for housing, homelessness, communities and regeneration throughout Scotland.

Communities Scotland was headquartered in Edinburgh with 8 area offices throughout Scotland.

Communities Scotland was disbanded on 1 April 2008, when most of its responsibilities transferred to the Housing and Regeneration directorate of the Scottish Government. The Scottish Housing Regulator was formed to take over the work of Communities Scotland's Regulation and Inspection division.

== History ==
Communities Scotland was formed in 2001 as the Executive's housing and regeneration delivery agency.

The Agency was charged with meeting the objectives of the Scottish Executive as set out in the Partnership for a better Scotland, a joint statement of the Scottish Executive to improve the life of people in Scotland.

On 31 October 2007 Nicola Sturgeon, the Cabinet Secretary for Health and Wellbeing, announced that she had decided to abolish Communities Scotland as a separate agency and bring its main non-regulatory functions into the core Scottish Government. She confirmed that its regulatory functions would be reformed to operate outside the Government and independently of Ministers.

== Role ==
The Agency had five stated objectives:

- To increase the supply of affordable housing where it is needed most.
- To improve the quality of existing houses and ensure a high quality of new build.
- To improve the quality of housing and homelessness services.
- To improve the opportunities for people living in disadvantaged communities.
- To support the social economy to deliver key services and create job opportunities.

Communities Scotland was granted a budget of £800 million in 2006–07. It provided grants to individuals, organisations and local authorities in Scotland for housing and community projects.

It also acted as an inspector and regulator for registered social landlords and local authorities in the provision of social housing (e.g. council houses).

== See also ==
- List of Scottish Executive agencies
