= Scottish Parliament =

Devolved parliament of Scotland

Coordinates: 55°57′08″N 3°10′29″W

Scottish Parliament: Pàrlamaid na h-Alba; Scots Pairlament
- 7th Parliament

Type
- Type: Unicameral

History
- Founded: 12 May 1999
- Preceded by: Parliament of Scotland (pre-union); Parliament of the United Kingdom (pre-devolution; partly)
- New session started: 14 May 2026

Leadership
- Monarch: Charles III since 8 September 2022
- Presiding Officer: Kenneth Gibson since 14 May 2026
- Deputy Presiding Officers: Clare Adamson & Katy Clark since 14 May 2026
- First Minister: John Swinney, SNP since 8 May 2024
- Deputy First Minister: Jenny Gilruth, SNP since 20 May 2026
- Minister for Parliamentary Business: Jamie Hepburn, SNP since 21 May 2026
- Leader of the largest opposition party: Michael Marra, Labour since 19 September 2026

Structure
- Seats: 129
- Graph of the party split among 129 seats.
- Political groups: Government (57) SNP (57) Opposition (71) Labour (17) (Note: Includes 6 MSPs sponsored by the Co-operative Party, who are designated Labour and Co-operative.) Reform UK (16) Greens (15) Conservative (12) Liberal Democrats (10) Independent (1) Other (1) Presiding Officer (1)
- Committees: 16: Climate Action; Criminal Justice; Delegated Powers and Law Reform; Economy, Energy and Tourism; Education and Gaelic; Equalities, Human Rights and Civil Justice; Europe, External Affairs and Civil Justice; Finance and Public Administration; Health, Care and Sport; Public Audit; Public Petitions; Public Service Reform; Rural Affairs; Social Justice, Housing and Local Government; Standards, Procedures and Public Appointments; Transport

Elections
- Voting system: Additional-member system (Mixed-member proportional representation)
- First election: 6 May 1999
- Last election: 7 May 2026
- Next election: On or before 1 May 2031

Meeting place
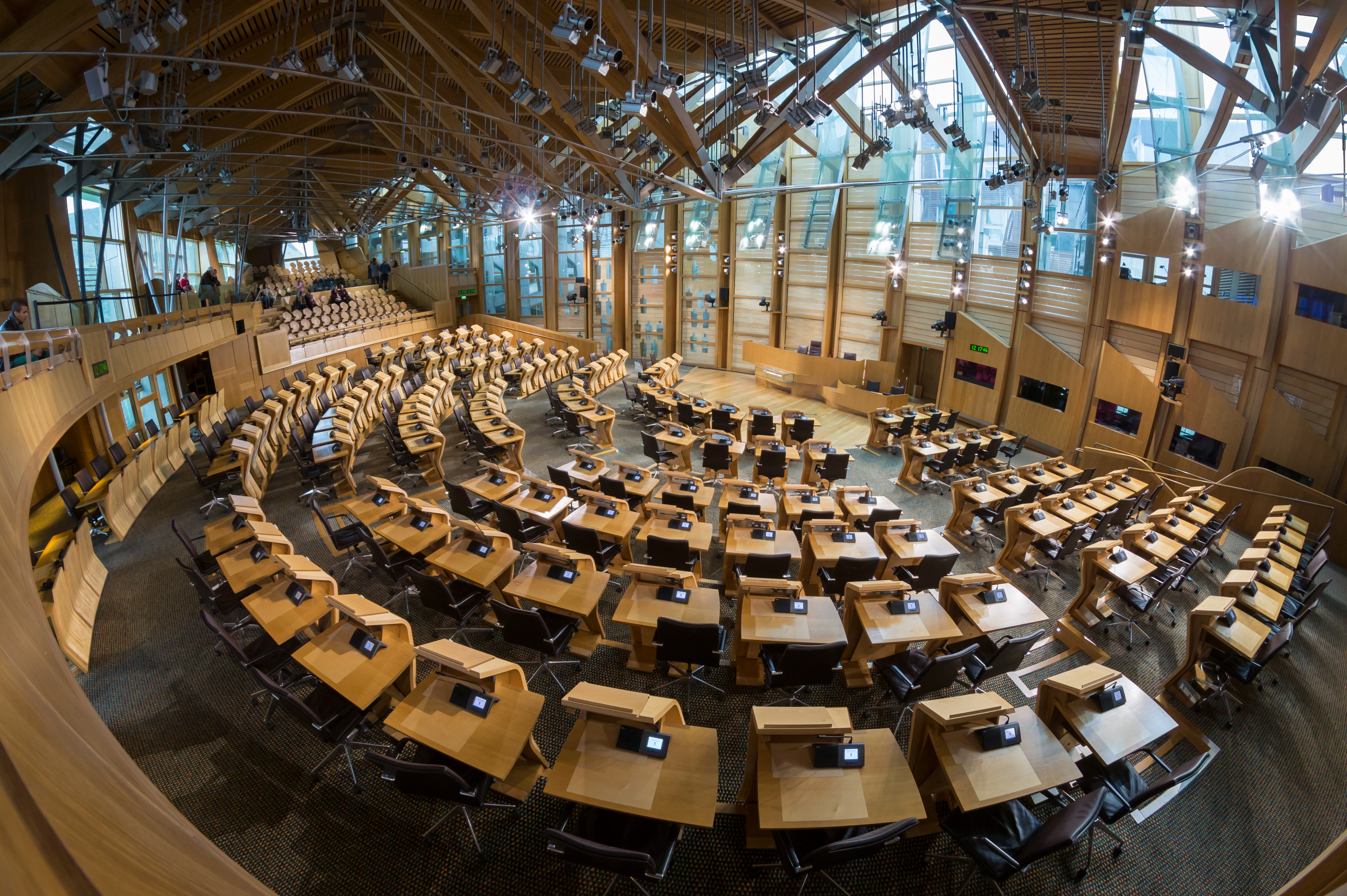
- Scottish Parliament Building; Edinburgh, Scotland

Website
- www.parliament.scot

The Scottish Parliament (Scottish Gaelic: Pàrlamaid na h-Alba [ˈpʰaːrˠl̪ˠəmɪtʲ nə ˈhal̪ˠapə]; Scots: Scots Pairlament) is the devolved, unicameral legislature of Scotland. It is located in the Holyrood area of Edinburgh, and is frequently referred to by the metonym Holyrood. It is a democratically elected body and its role is to scrutinise the Scottish Government and legislate on devolved matters that are not reserved to the Parliament of the United Kingdom.

The Scottish Parliament comprises 129 members known as Members of the Scottish Parliament (MSPs), elected for five-year terms under the regionalised form of Additional-member system (MMP): 73 MSPs represent individual geographical constituencies elected by the plurality (first-past-the-post) system, while a further 56 are returned as list members from eight additional member regions. Each region elects seven party-list MSPs. Each region elects 15 to 17 MSPs in total. The most recent general election to the Parliament was held on 7 May 2026, with the Scottish National Party winning the most seats but falling short of a majority.

The original Parliament of Scotland was the national legislature of the independent Kingdom of Scotland and existed from the early 13th century until the Kingdom of Scotland merged with the Kingdom of England under the Acts of Union 1707 to form the Kingdom of Great Britain. As a consequence, the Parliament of Scotland and the Parliament of England were subsumed into the Parliament of Great Britain. In practice, all of the traditions, procedures, and standing orders of the English parliament were retained, with the addition of Scottish members in both the Commons and Lords.

Following a referendum in 1997, in which the Scottish electorate voted for devolution, the powers of the devolved legislature were specified by the Scotland Act 1998. The Act delineates the legislative competence of the Parliament – the areas in which it can make laws – by explicitly specifying powers that are "reserved" to the Parliament of the United Kingdom. The Scottish Parliament has the power to legislate in all areas that are not explicitly reserved to Westminster. The UK Parliament retains the ability to amend the terms of reference of the Scottish Parliament, and can extend or reduce the areas in which it can make laws. The first meeting of the reconvened Parliament took place on 12 May 1999.

The legislative competence of the Scottish Parliament has been amended numerous times since then. The Scotland Act 2012 and Scotland Act 2016 expanded the Parliament's powers, especially over taxation and welfare. The purpose of the United Kingdom Internal Market Act 2020, the most recent amendment, is to constrain the powers of the devolved institutions and restrict the exercise of devolved competences. Its effect is to undermine the freedom of action, regulatory competence and authority of the Parliament, limiting its ability to make different economic or social choices to those made by Westminster.

== History ==
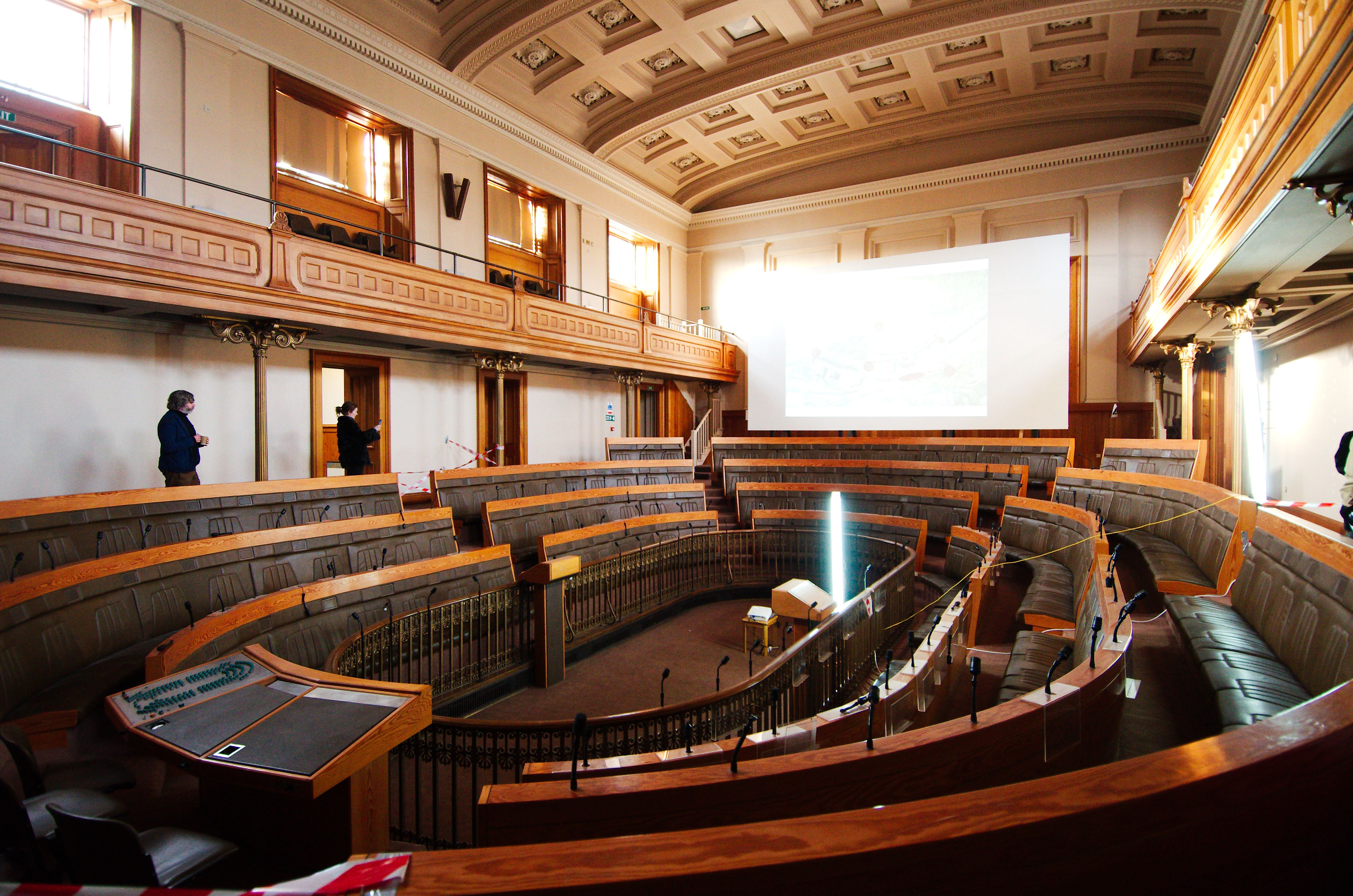
Debating Chamber at the Old Royal High School in Edinburgh, the proposed location for the 1978 Scottish Assembly

Before the Treaty of Union 1707 united the Kingdom of Scotland and the Kingdom of England into a new state called "Great Britain", Scotland had an independent parliament known as the Parliament of Scotland. Initial Scottish proposals during negotiations suggested that Scotland's parliament could continue to exist in the new union, but this was not accepted by the English negotiators. For the next 290 years, Scotland was governed by the Parliament of Great Britain and the subsequent Parliament of the United Kingdom, both seated at Westminster.

Suggestions for a 'devolved' Parliament were made before 1914, but were shelved due to the outbreak of the First World War.A sharp rise in nationalism in Scotland during the late 1960s fuelled demands for some form of home rule or complete independence, and in 1969 prompted the incumbent Labour government of Harold Wilson to set up the Kilbrandon Commission to consider the British constitution. One of the principal objectives of the commission was to examine ways of enabling more self-government for Scotland, within the unitary state of the United Kingdom. Kilbrandon published his report in 1973 recommending the establishment of a directly elected Scottish Assembly to legislate for the majority of domestic Scottish affairs.

During this time the discovery of oil in the North Sea and the following "It's Scotland's oil" campaign of the Scottish National Party (SNP) resulted in rising support for Scottish independence, as well as the SNP. The party argued that the revenues from the oil were not benefitting Scotland as much as they should. The combined effect of these events led to Prime Minister Wilson committing his government to some form of devolved legislature in 1974. Under the terms of the Scotland Act 1978, an elected assembly would be set up in Edinburgh if the public approved it in a referendum be held on 1 March 1979. A narrow majority of 51.6% to 48.4% voted in favour of a Scottish Assembly, but the Act also required that at least 40% of the total electorate vote in favour of the proposal. As the turnout was only 63.6%, the vote in favour represented only 32.9% of the eligible voting population, and the Assembly was not established. Throughout the 1980s and 1990s, demand for a Scottish Parliament grew, in part because the government of the United Kingdom was controlled by the Conservative Party, while Scotland itself elected relatively few Conservative MPs. In the aftermath of the 1979 referendum defeat, the Campaign for a Scottish Assembly was initiated as a pressure group, leading to the 1989 Scottish Constitutional Convention with various organisations such as Scottish churches, political parties and representatives of industry taking part. Publishing its blueprint for devolution in 1995, the Convention provided much of the basis for the structure of the Parliament. Devolution continued to form part of the platform of the Labour Party which won power under Tony Blair in May 1997. In September 1997, the Scottish devolution referendum was put to the Scottish electorate and secured a majority in favour of the reestablishment of the Scottish Parliament, with tax-varying powers, in Edinburgh.

=== Opening of the new Scottish Parliament ===
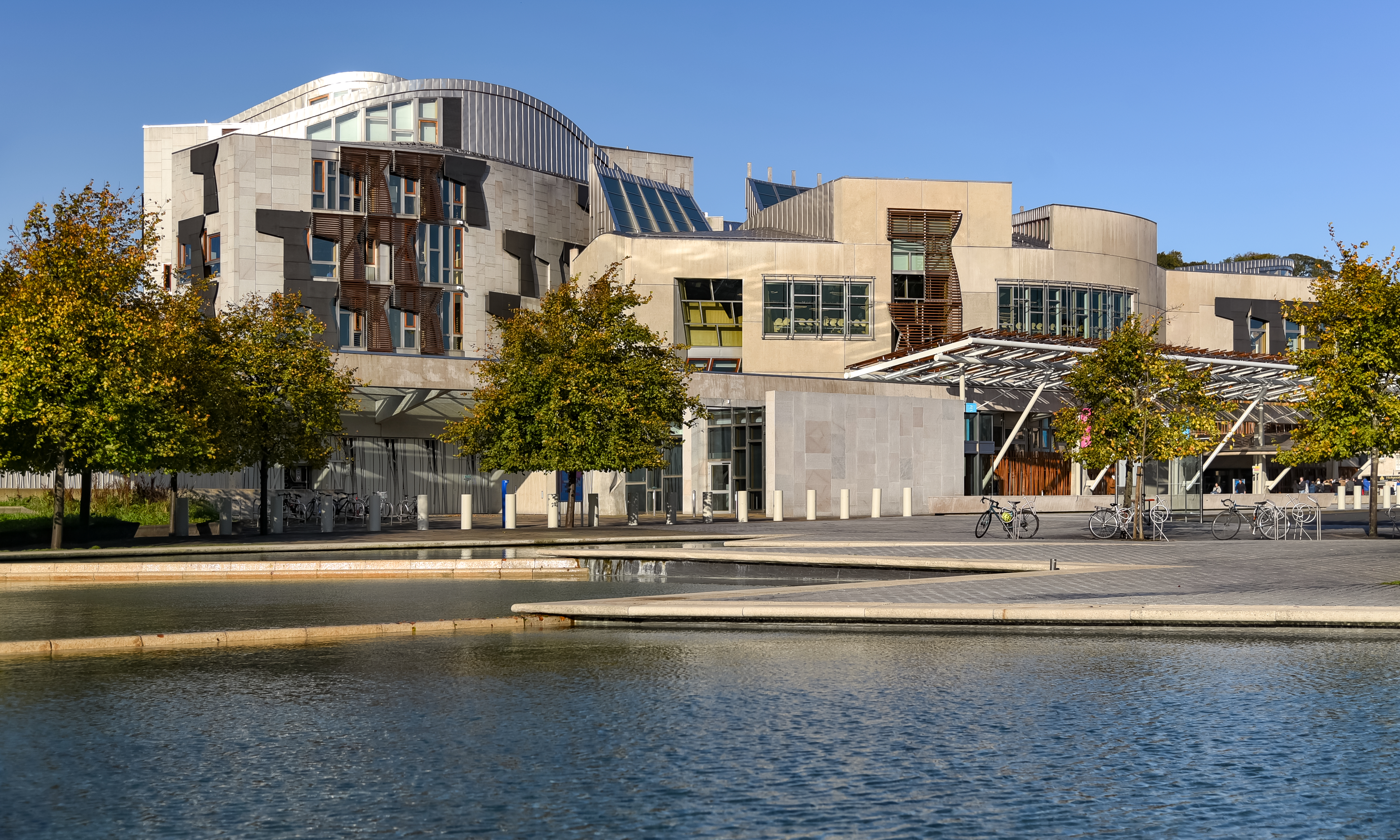
The Scottish Parliament building, opened in October 2004

An election was held on 6 May 1999, and on 1 July of that year power was transferred from Westminster to the new reconvened Parliament. While the permanent building at Holyrood was being constructed, a temporary home for the Parliament was found in Edinburgh. The General Assembly Hall of the Church of Scotland on the Royal Mile was chosen to host the Parliament. Official photographs and television interviews were held in the courtyard adjoining the Assembly Hall, which is part of the School of Divinity of the University of Edinburgh. This building was vacated twice to allow for the meeting of the Church's General Assembly. In May 2000, the Parliament was temporarily relocated to the former Strathclyde Regional Council debating chamber at Strathclyde House in Glasgow, and to the University of Aberdeen in May 2002.

Since September 2004 the official home of the Scottish Parliament has been a new Scottish Parliament Building, in the Holyrood area of Edinburgh. The Scottish Parliament building was designed by Spanish architect Enric Miralles in partnership with local Edinburgh Architecture firm RMJM which was led by Design Principal Tony Kettle. Some of the principal features of the complex include leaf-shaped buildings, a grass-roofed branch merging into adjacent parkland and gabion walls formed from the stones of previous buildings. Throughout the building there are many repeated motifs, such as shapes based on Raeburn's Skating Minister. Crow-stepped gables and the upturned boat skylights of the Garden Lobby, complete the unique architecture. Queen Elizabeth II opened the new building on 9 October 2004.

In September 2024, the Scottish Parliament celebrated its 25th anniversary, with the King and Queen in attendance.

== Officials ==
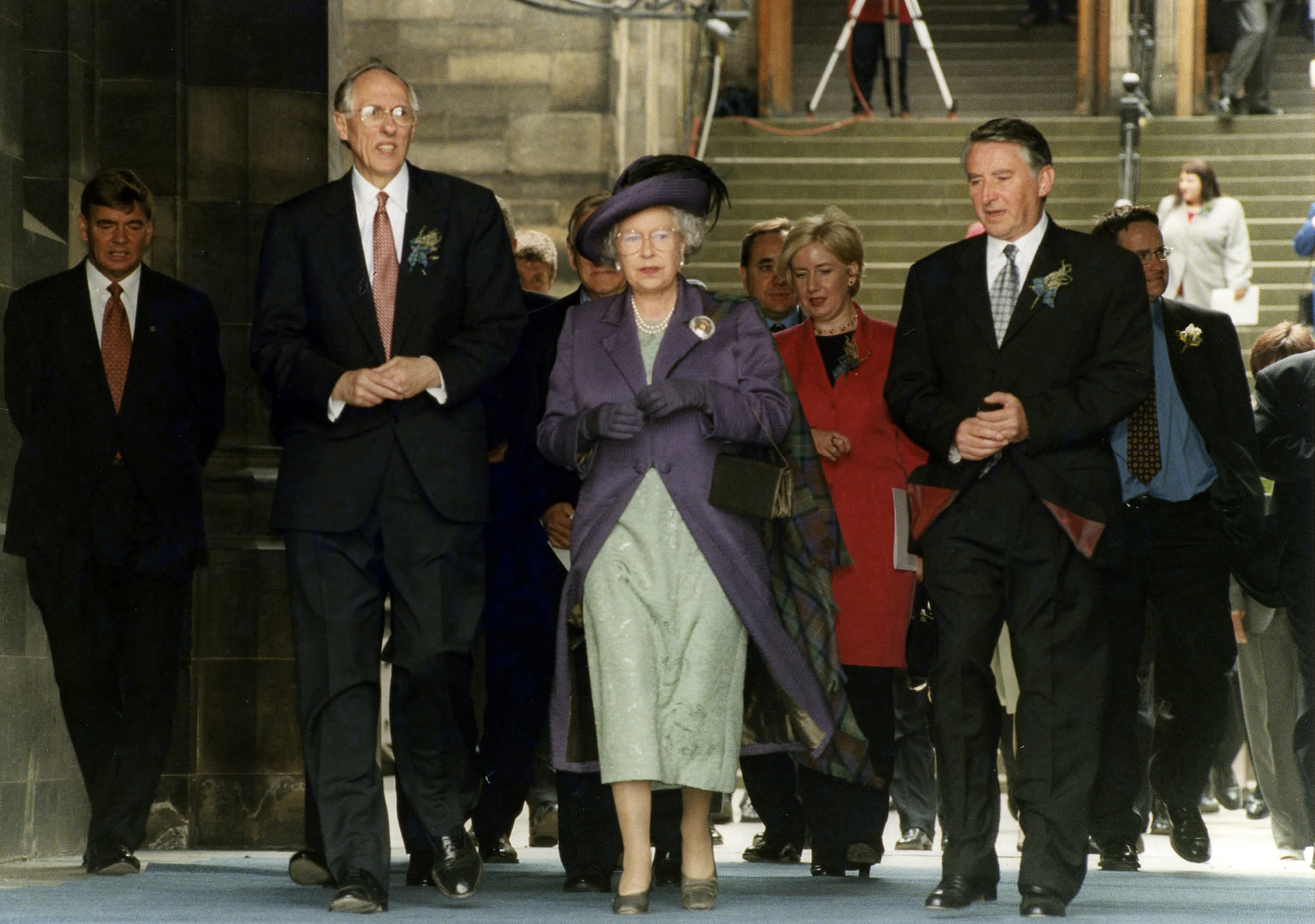
Queen Elizabeth II at the opening of the Scottish Parliament on 1 July 1999 alongside then First Minister of Scotland Donald Dewar and then Presiding Officer Lord Steel of Aikwood

After each election to the Scottish Parliament, at the beginning of each parliamentary session, Parliament elects one MSP to serve as Presiding Officer, the equivalent of the speaker in other legislatures, and two MSPs to serve as deputies. The Presiding Officer (as of May 2026, Kenneth Gibson) and deputies (as of May 2026, Clare Adamson and Katy Clark) are elected by a secret ballot of the 129 MSPs, which is the only secret ballot conducted in the Scottish Parliament. Principally, the role of the Presiding Officer is to chair chamber proceedings and the Scottish Parliamentary Corporate Body. When chairing meetings of the Parliament, the Presiding Officer and his/her deputies must be politically impartial. During debates, the Presiding Officer (or the deputy) is assisted by the parliamentary clerks, who give advice on how to interpret the standing orders that govern the proceedings of meetings. A vote clerk sits in front of the Presiding Officer and operates the electronic voting equipment and chamber clocks.

As a member of the Scottish Parliamentary Corporate Body, the Presiding Officer is responsible for ensuring that the Parliament functions effectively and has the staff, property and resources it requires to operate. Convening the Parliamentary Bureau, which allocates time and sets the work agenda in the chamber, is another of the roles of the Presiding Officer. Under the Standing Orders of the Parliament the Bureau consists of the Presiding Officer and one representative from each political party with five or more seats in the Parliament. Amongst the duties of the Bureau are to agree the timetable of business in the chamber, establish the number, remit and membership of parliamentary committees and regulate the passage of legislation (bills) through the Parliament. The Presiding Officer also represents the Scottish Parliament at home and abroad in an official capacity.

The Presiding Officer controls debates by calling on members to speak. The Presiding Officer rules on points of order raised by members, which are not subject to debate or appeal. The Presiding Officer may also discipline members who fail to observe the rules of the Parliament.

== Parliamentary chamber ==
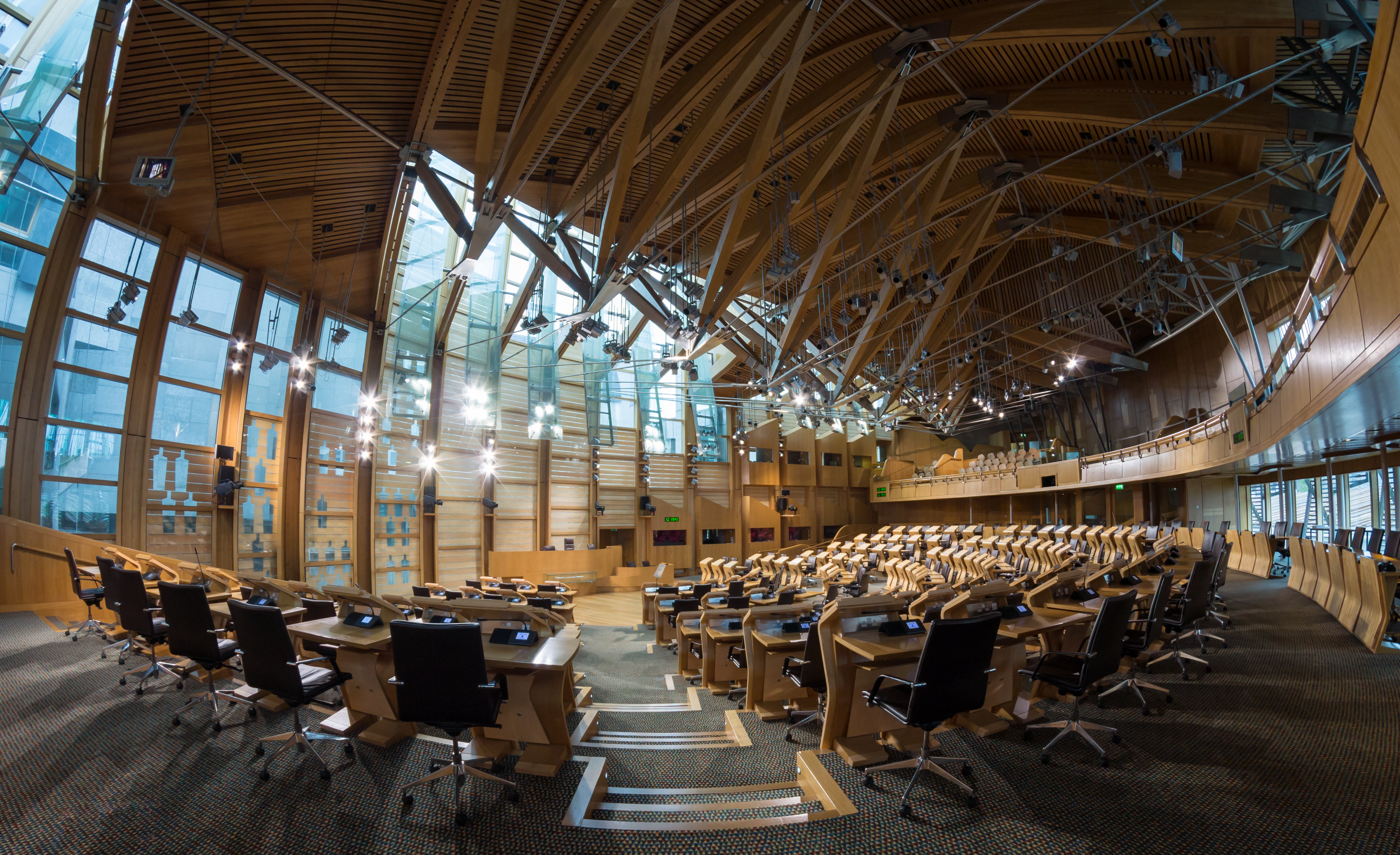
Seating in the debating chamber is arranged in a semicircle, with ministers sitting in the front section of the semicircle, directly opposite the presiding officer and parliamentary clerks.

The debating chamber of the Scottish Parliament has seating arranged in a hemicycle, a design which is common across European legislatures, intended to encourage consensus and compromise. There are 131 seats in the debating chamber. Of the total 131 seats, 129 are occupied by the Parliament's elected MSPs and two are seats for the Scottish Law Officers—the Lord Advocate and the Solicitor General for Scotland, who are not elected members of the Parliament but are members of the Scottish Government. As such, the Law Officers may attend and speak in the plenary meetings of the Parliament but, as they are not elected MSPs, cannot vote.

Members are able to sit anywhere in the debating chamber, but typically sit in their party groupings. The First Minister, Scottish cabinet ministers and law officers sit in the front row, in the middle section of the chamber. The largest party in the Parliament sits in the middle of the semicircle, with opposing parties on either side. The Presiding Officer, parliamentary clerks and officials sit opposite members at the front of the debating chamber.

In front of the Presiding Officers' desk is the parliamentary mace, which is made from silver and inlaid with gold panned from Scottish rivers and inscribed with the words: Wisdom, Compassion, Justice and Integrity. The words There shall be a Scottish Parliament, which are the first words of the Scotland Act, are inscribed around the head of the mace, which has a ceremonial role in the meetings of Parliament, representing the authority of the Parliament to make laws. Presented to the Scottish Parliament by the Queen upon Parliament's official opening in July 1999, the mace is displayed in a glass case, suspended from the lid. At the beginning of each sitting in the chamber, the lid of the case is rotated so that the mace is above the glass, to symbolise that a full meeting of the Parliament is taking place.

== Proceedings ==
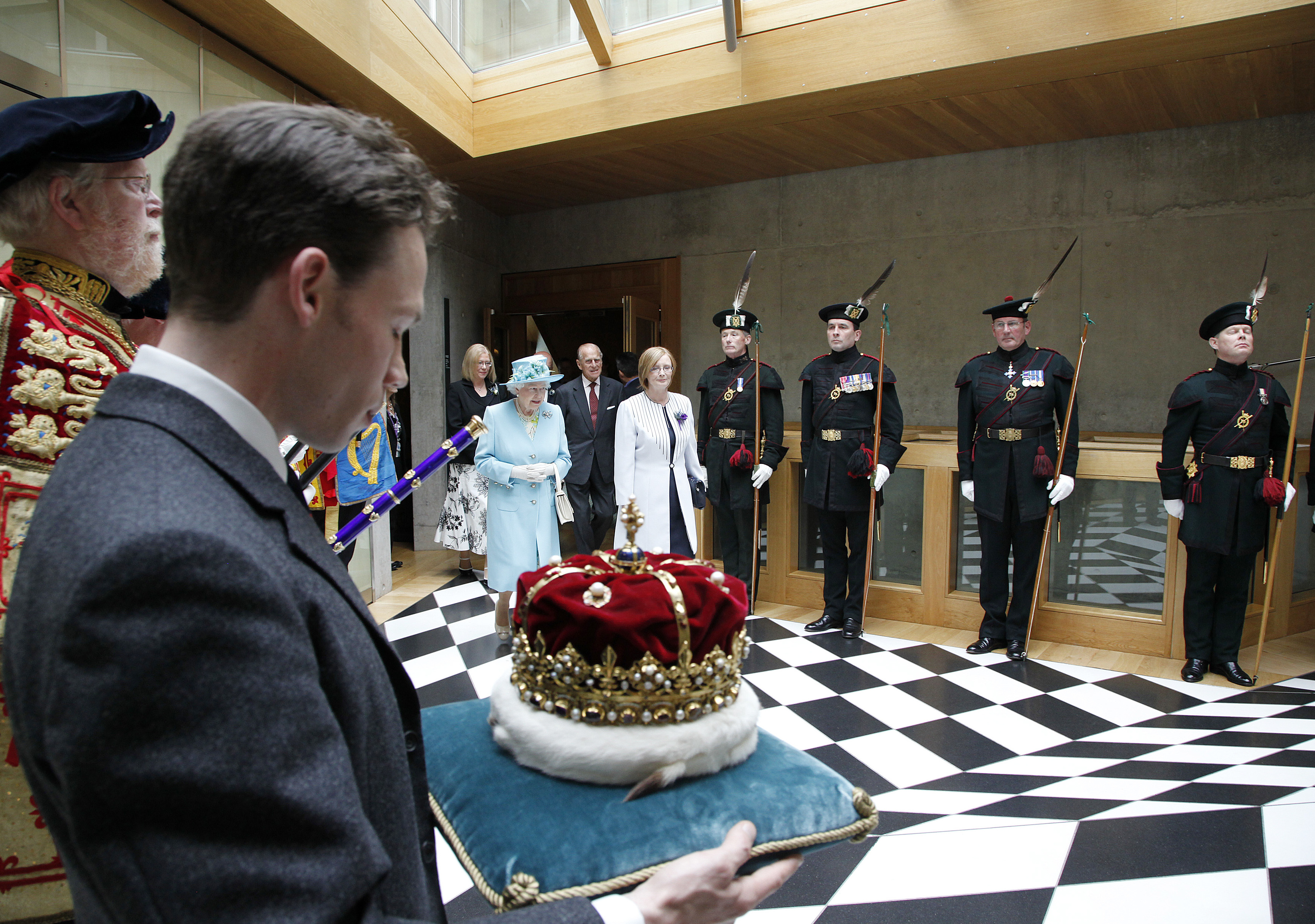
The Crown of Scotland is carried by the Duke of Hamilton as Queen Elizabeth II leaves the Chamber, following the Opening of the fourth Session in July 2011.

Parliament typically sits Tuesdays, Wednesdays and Thursdays from early January to late June and from early September to mid December, with two-week recesses in April and October. Plenary meetings in the debating chamber usually take place on Wednesday afternoons from 2 pm to 6 pm and on Thursdays from 9:15 am to 6 pm. Chamber debates and committee meetings are open to the public. Entry is free, but booking in advance is recommended due to limited space. Parliament TV is a webcast and archive of Parliamentary business back to 2012. and on the BBC's parliamentary channel BBC Parliament. Proceedings are also recorded in text form, in print and online, in the Official Report, which is the substantially verbatim transcript of parliamentary debates.

Since September 2012, the first item of business on Tuesday afternoons is usually Time for Reflection at which a speaker addresses members for up to four minutes, sharing a perspective on issues of faith. This contrasts with the formal style of "Prayers", which is the first item of business in meetings of the House of Commons. Speakers are drawn from across Scotland and are chosen to represent the balance of religious beliefs according to the Scottish census. Invitations to address Parliament in this manner are determined by the Presiding Officer on the advice of the parliamentary bureau. Faith groups can make direct representations to the Presiding Officer to nominate speakers. Before September 2012, Time for reflection was held on Wednesday afternoons.

The Presiding Officer (or Deputy Presiding Officer) decides who speaks in chamber debates and the amount of time for which they are allowed to speak. Normally, the Presiding Officer tries to achieve a balance between different viewpoints and political parties when selecting members to speak. Typically, ministers or party leaders open debates, with opening speakers given between 5 and 20 minutes, and succeeding speakers allocated less time. The Presiding Officer can reduce speaking time if a large number of members wish to participate in the debate. Debate is more informal than in some parliamentary systems. Members may call each other directly by name, rather than by constituency or cabinet position, and hand clapping is allowed. Speeches to the chamber are normally delivered in English, but members may use Scots, Gaelic, or any other language with the agreement of the Presiding Officer. The Scottish Parliament has conducted debates in the Gaelic language.

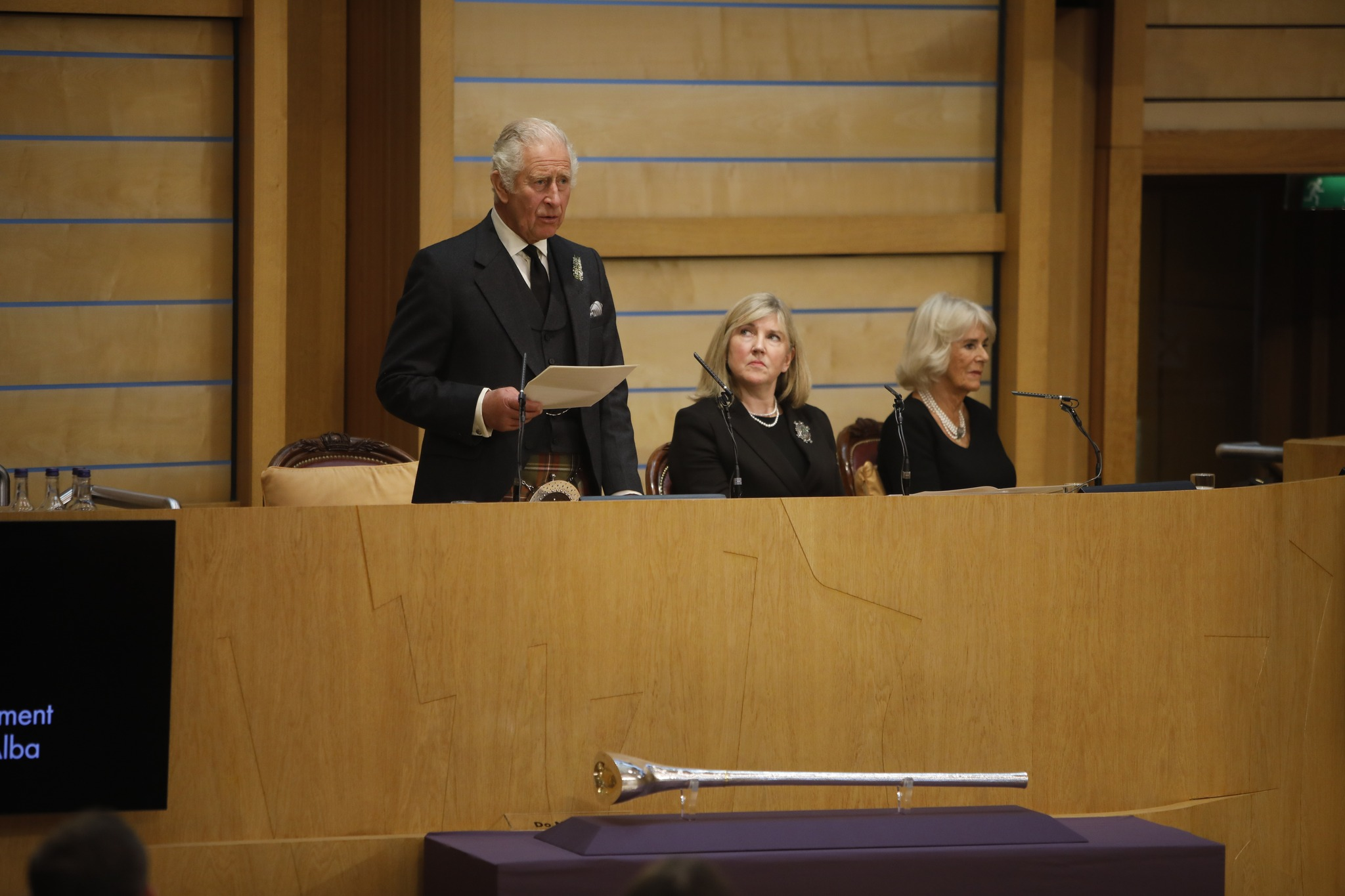
King Charles III addresses the chamber of the Scottish Parliament in September 2022. The parliament's Presiding Officer, Alison Johnstone, is seated in the centre and Queen Camilla to the far right.

Each sitting day, normally at 5 pm, MSPs decide on all the motions and amendments that have been moved that day. This "Decision Time" is heralded by the sounding of the division bell, which is heard throughout the Parliamentary campus and alerts MSPs who are not in the chamber to return and vote. At Decision Time, the Presiding Officer puts questions on the motions and amendments by reading out the name of the motion or amendment as well as the proposer and asking "Are we all agreed?", to which the chamber first votes orally. If there is audible dissent, the Presiding Officer announces "There will be a division" and members vote by means of electronic consoles on their desks. Each MSP has a unique access card with a microchip which, when inserted into the console, identifies them and allows them to vote. As a result, the outcome of each division is known in seconds.

The outcome of most votes can be predicted since political parties normally instruct members which way to vote. Parties entrust some MSPs, known as whips, with the task of ensuring that party members vote according to the party line. MSPs do not tend to vote against such instructions, since those who do are unlikely to reach higher political ranks in their parties. Errant members can be deselected as official party candidates during future elections, and, in serious cases, may be expelled from their parties outright. Thus, as with many Parliaments, the independence of Members of the Scottish Parliament tends to be low, and backbench rebellions by members who are discontent with their party's policies are rare. In some circumstances, however, parties announce "free votes", which allows Members to vote as they please. This is typically done on moral issues.

Immediately after Decision Time a "Members Debate" is held, which lasts for 45 minutes. Members Business is a debate on a motion proposed by an MSP who is not a Scottish minister. Such motions are on issues which may be of interest to a particular area such as a member's own constituency, an upcoming or past event or any other item which would otherwise not be accorded official parliamentary time. As well as the proposer, other members normally contribute to the debate. The relevant minister, whose department the debate and motion relate to "winds up" the debate by speaking after all other participants.

== Committees ==
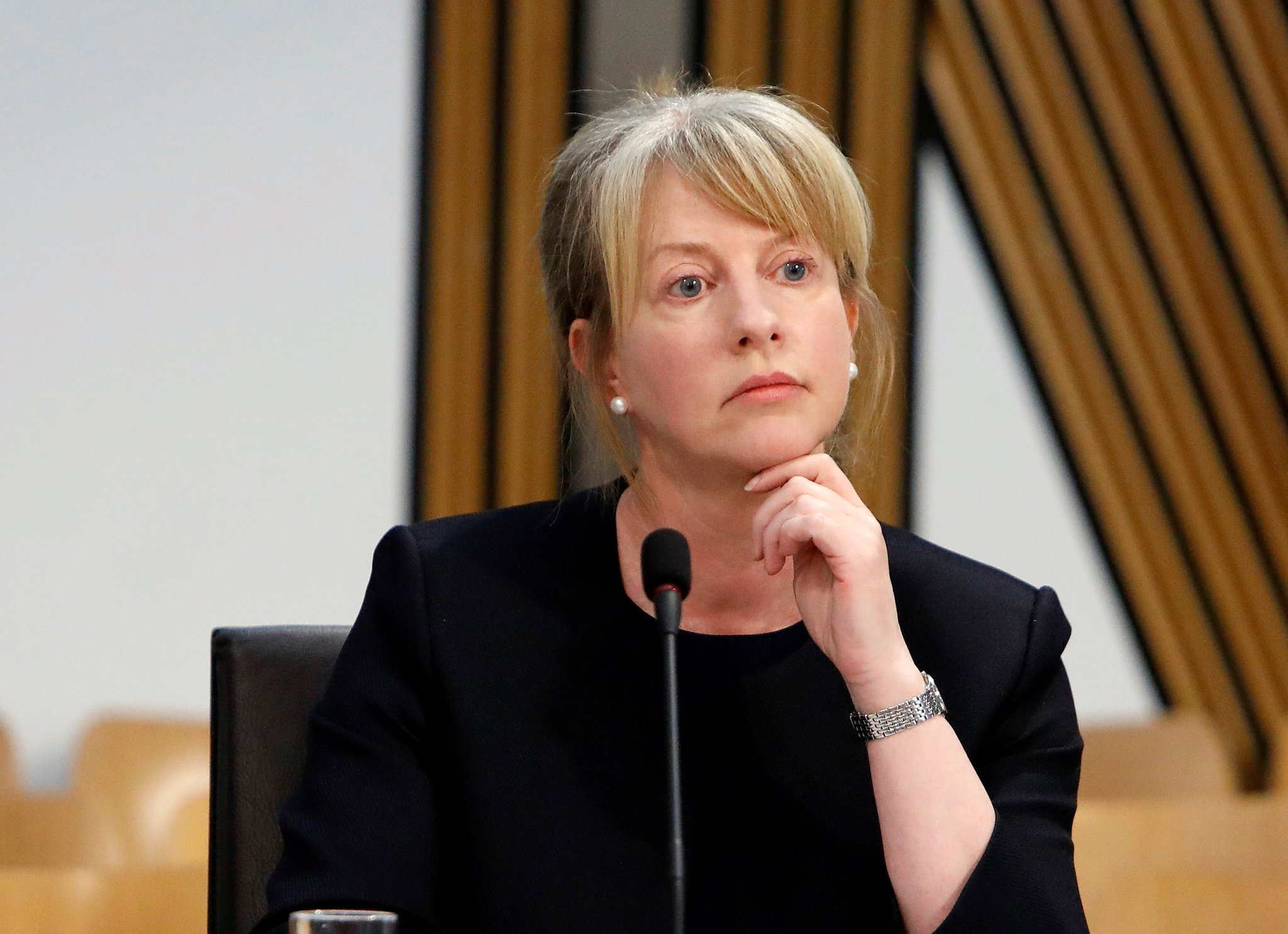
Shona Robison, Cabinet Secretary for Social Justice, Housing and Local Government during the Third Sturgeon government before the Civil Justice Committee

Much of the work of the Scottish Parliament is done in committee. The role of committees is stronger in the Scottish Parliament than in other parliamentary systems, partly as a means of strengthening the role of backbenchers in their scrutiny of the government and partly to compensate for the fact that there is no revising chamber. The principal role of committees in the Scottish Parliament is to take evidence from witnesses, conduct inquiries and scrutinise legislation. Committee meetings take place on Tuesday, Wednesday and Thursday morning when Parliament is sitting. Committees can also meet at other locations throughout Scotland.

Committees comprise a small number of MSPs, who look at specific subjects such as health, the economy or justice. They play a central role in the work of the Scottish parliament because, unlike the UK Parliament, the Scottish parliament is a single-chamber parliament. The committees can thus, consider and amend proposals for new laws, they can also propose new laws themselves. The committees can investigate any area that is within their remit and publish recommendations, and can also report on petitions that have been submitted by members of the public or groups. The current Mandatory Committees in the seventh Session of the Scottish Parliament are: Public Audit; Equalities, Human Rights and Civil Justice; Europe, External Affairs and Culture; Finance and Public Administrations; Public Petitions; Standards, Procedures and Public Appointments; and Delegated Powers and Law Reform.

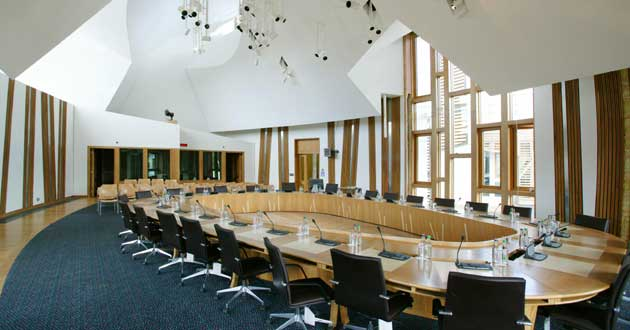
A Committee Room in the Scottish Parliament Building

Subject Committees are established at the beginning of each parliamentary session, and again the members on each committee reflect the balance of parties across Parliament. Typically each committee corresponds with one (or more) of the departments (or ministries) of the Scottish Government. The current Subject Committees in the seventh Session are: Climate Action; Criminal Justice; Economy, Tourism and Energy; Education and Gaelic; Health, Care and Sport; Public Service Reform; Rural Affairs; Social Justice, Housing and Local Government; and Transport.

A further type of committee is normally set up to scrutinise private bills submitted to the Scottish Parliament by an outside party or promoter who is not a member of the Scottish Parliament or Scottish Government. Private bills normally relate to large-scale development projects such as infrastructure projects that require the use of land or property. Private Bill Committees have been set up to consider legislation on issues such as the development of the Edinburgh Tram Network, the Glasgow Airport Rail Link, the Airdrie–Bathgate rail link and extensions to the National Gallery of Scotland.

== Legislative functions and powers ==
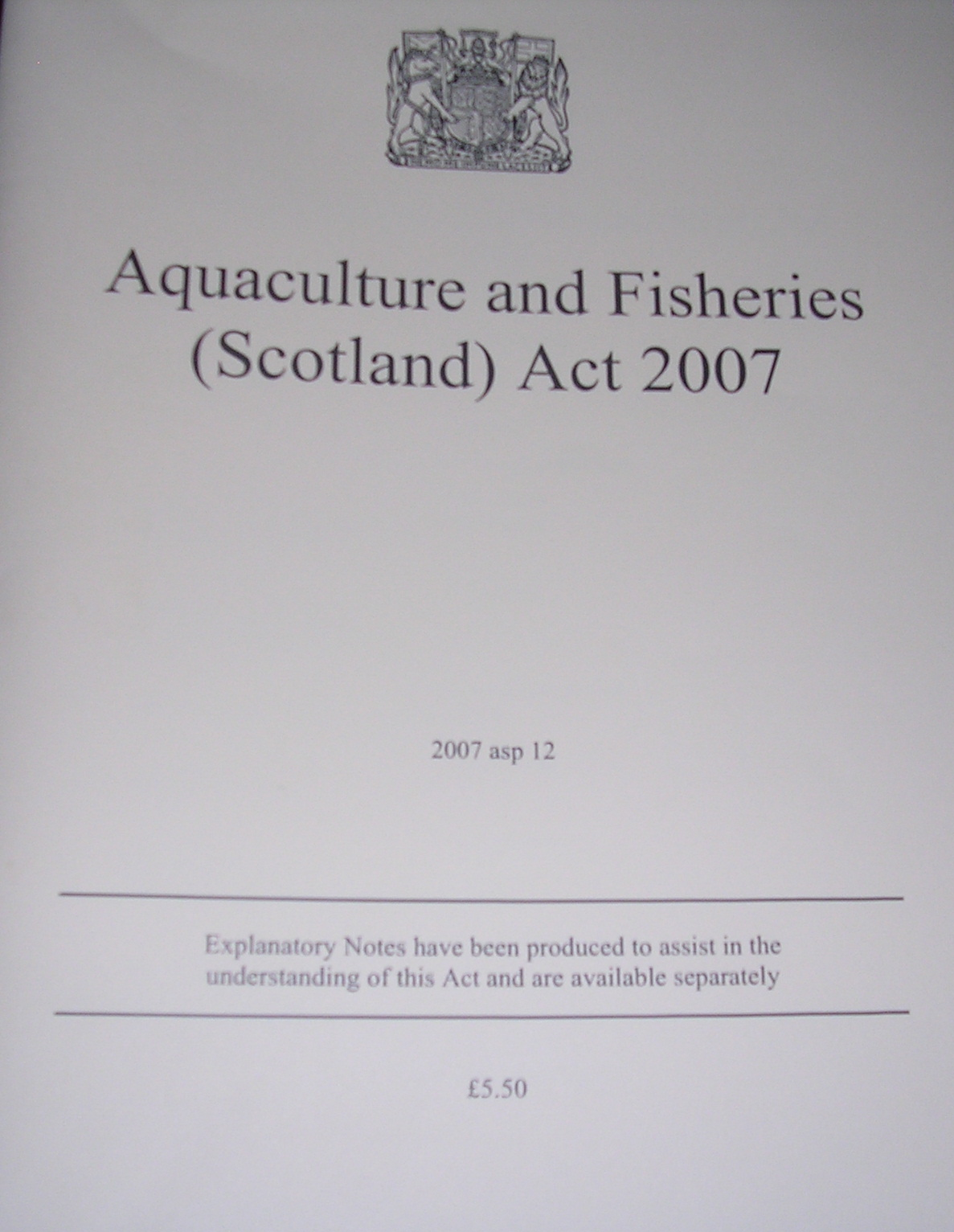
After a bill has passed through all legislative stages, it becomes an Act of the Scottish Parliament.

The Scotland Act 1998, which was passed by the Parliament of the United Kingdom under the first Blair ministry and given royal assent by Queen Elizabeth II on 19 November 1998, governs the functions and role of the Scottish Parliament and delimits its legislative competence. Since the establishment of the Parliament, there have been a number of changes to its legislative competence.

The Parliament is able to debate any issue (including those reserved to Westminster) but is unable to make laws on issues that are outside its legislative competence. As the Scottish Parliament is able to make laws on the areas constitutionally devolved to it, the legislative process begins with bills (draft laws) which are presented to Parliament. Bills can be introduced to Parliament in a number of ways; the Scottish Government can introduce new laws or amendments to existing laws as a bill; a committee of the Parliament can present a bill in one of the areas under its remit; a member of the Scottish Parliament can introduce a bill as a private member; or a private bill can be submitted to Parliament by an outside proposer. Most draft laws are government bills introduced by ministers in the governing party (or parties). Bills pass through Parliament in a number of stages before receiving royal assent, whereupon they become Acts of the Scottish Parliament.

The Scotland Act 2012, passed under the Cameron–Clegg coalition, devolved the powers to set income tax rates, introduce taxes on land transactions and waste disposal from landfill. Following the unsuccessful Scottish independence referendum in 2014, the UK and Scottish governments signed the Smith Commission Agreement which led to the Scotland Act 2016, passed under the Second Cameron ministry. The Act extended the Parliament's devolved competencies, according to the Secretary of State for Scotland making it one of the most powerful devolved parliaments in the world. Areas devolved included taxation powers, welfare and elections.

The United Kingdom Internal Market Act 2020 is intended to restrict the operation of devolved powers. The primary purpose of the act is to limit the autonomy of the devolved institutions in policy areas that could generate potential barriers to interior UK trade. It was passed under the second ministry of Boris Johnson. Following Brexit, the UK is no longer directly subject to EU law. The European Union (Withdrawal) Act 2018 created a presumption that powers would remain within the competence of the devolved parliaments, but the Scottish and UK governments could not agree on how to deal with areas of where common frameworks could not be agreed. The act gives UK ministers extended powers to enforce mutual recognition of regulations across the UK, and the exemptions permitted for the devolved administrations are significantly less extensive than previous exemptions under the EU Single Market rules.

The act both legally and practically restrains the legislative competence of the Parliament and undermines devolution. The impact assessment published by the Department for Business, Energy and Industrial Strategy noted: "The final cost of this legislation is the potentially reduced ability for different parts of the UK to achieve local policy benefits. While this legislation does not constrain the ability of different parts of the UK to introduce distinct policies, to the extent that those policies may be enforceable on a reduced number of businesses might make it harder to realise fully the benefits of those policies." The legislation undermines the freedom of action, regulatory competence and authority of the Parliament, limiting its ability to make different economic or social choices from those by the UK Parliament. It also limits the Scottish Government's ability to focus and plan investment in infrastructure in Scotland.

Although the UK Government stated on publication that the proposed bill sought to "protect the integrity of the UK's single market", the legislation has been criticised for its dealings with the devolved nations. First Minister Nicola Sturgeon called the bill a "full frontal assault on devolution". The Secretary of State for Scotland Alister Jack rejected Sturgeon's comments, saying the Bill "will strengthen the Scottish Parliament and create new opportunities for Scotland."

Under the terms of the Scotland Acts, the Parliament of the United Kingdom agreed to devolve some of its responsibilities over Scottish domestic policy to the Scottish Parliament. The Scotland Act 1998 enabled the Scottish Parliament to pass primary legislation on these issues, and to hold the Scottish Government to account. Although the Westminster Parliament retains the authority to legislate on devolved matters, under the Sewel convention it is understood that it will not do so without the consent of the Scottish Parliament.

=== Powers of the Scottish Parliament ===
All matters that are not specifically stated in Schedule 5 to the Scotland Act as reserved matters are automatically devolved to the Scottish Parliament. The Scottish Parliament has powers over areas such as:

- agriculture, fisheries, animal welfare, and forestry
- environment, land registration and use
- food safety and food standards
- consumer advocacy and advice
- water and sanitation
- the Crown Estate
- economic development and inward investment
- income tax on non-savings and non-dividend income
- issue of Scottish Government bonds to finance capital investment
- Council Tax, Business rates, Air Departure Tax, Land and Buildings Transaction Tax, Scottish Landfill Tax and Scottish Aggregates Tax
- education (early, primary, secondary and tertiary) and training
- Scots language and Gaelic language
- health and social care
- abortion law
- legal system, human rights and legal aid
- civil and criminal law
- courts and tribunals
- legal profession
- police and fire and rescue services
- prisons and parole
- air gun licensing
- alcohol licensing
- hunting with dogs and dangerous dogs
- civil registration, census, demography, statistics, national archives
- planning permission
- local government
- culture, sport, the arts, heritage and tourism
- parking controls, bus policy, concessionary fares, cycling, taxis and minicabs
- railway services, franchising, and construction of new railways
- road network, trunk road management, road signs and speed limits
- shipping, ports, inland waterways, harbours and ferries
- housing, homelessness and building standards
- charities
- onshore petroleum
- heating and cooling
- bank holidays
- Sunday trading
- welfare foods for pregnant women, mothers and children
- devolved social security benefits

=== Reserved powers ===
Reserved matters are subjects that are outside the legislative competence of the Scottish Parliament and are reserved to the United Kingdom Parliament. These include:

- the constitution
- foreign affairs
- broadcasting
- civil service
- defence
- treason
- fiscal, economic and monetary policy, currency, government borrowing and lending, the exchange rate and the Bank of England
- inheritance tax, value-added tax, excise duties, motoring taxation, corporation tax
- National Insurance, capital gains tax, income tax on savings and dividend income
- pensions
- financial services and markets
- drug policy
- data protection
- firearms
- immigration and nationality
- national security
- betting, gaming and lotteries
- competition, intellectual property, import and export control, consumer protection
- product standards, weights and measures
- telecommunications
- post
- common markets for UK goods and services
- electricity, coal, oil, gas, nuclear energy
- employment and industrial relations, health and safety
- most aspects of transport safety and regulation
- Working Tax Credit, Jobseeker's Allowance, Income Support, Child Benefit, Child tax credit, Housing Benefit, Universal Credit.

== Scrutiny of government ==
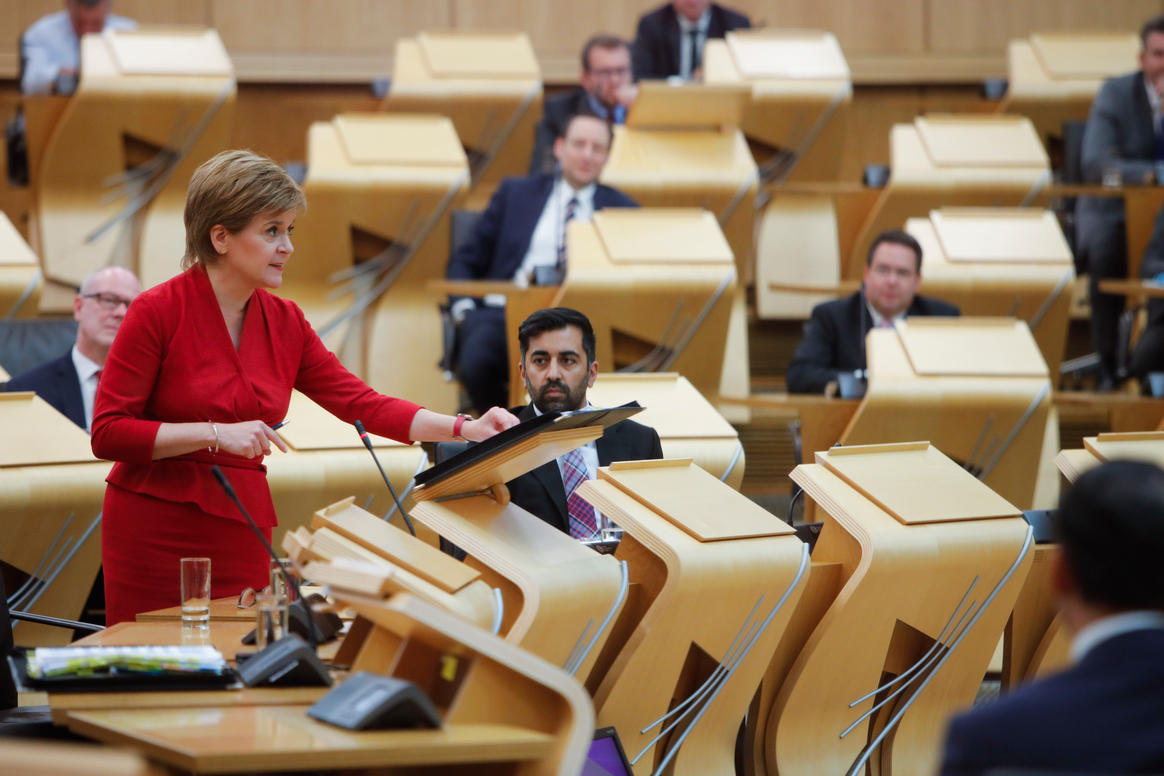
First Minister Nicola Sturgeon in the Scottish Parliament during First Minister's Questions

The party, or parties, that hold the majority of seats in the Parliament forms the Scottish Government. In contrast to many other parliamentary systems, Parliament elects a First Minister from a number of candidates at the beginning of each parliamentary term (after a general election). Any member can put their name forward to be First Minister, and a vote is taken by all members of Parliament. Normally, the leader of the largest party is returned as First Minister, and head of the Scottish Government. Theoretically, Parliament also elects the Scottish Ministers who form the government of Scotland and sit in the Scottish cabinet, but such ministers are, in practice, appointed to their roles by the First Minister. Junior ministers, who do not attend cabinet, are also appointed to assist Scottish ministers in their departments. Most ministers and their juniors are drawn from amongst the elected MSPs, with the exception of Scotland's Chief Law Officers: the Lord Advocate and the Solicitor General. Whilst the First Minister chooses the ministers – and may decide to remove them at any time – the formal appointment or dismissal is made by the Sovereign.

Several procedures enable the Scottish Parliament to scrutinise the Government. The First Minister or members of the cabinet can deliver statements to Parliament upon which MSPs are invited to question. For example, at the beginning of each parliamentary year, the First Minister delivers a statement to the chamber setting out the Government's legislative programme for the forthcoming year. After the statement has been delivered, the leaders of the opposition parties and other MSPs question the First Minister on issues related to the substance of the statement.

Parliamentary time is also set aside for question periods in the debating chamber. A "General Question Time" takes place on a Thursday between 11:40 a.m. and noon where members can direct questions to any member of the Scottish Government. At 2:30 pm, a 40-minute-long themed "Question Time" takes place, where members can ask questions of ministers in departments that are selected for questioning that sitting day, such as health and justice or education and transport. Between noon and 12:30 p.m. on Thursdays, when Parliament is sitting, First Minister's Question Time takes place. This gives members an opportunity to question the First Minister directly on issues under their jurisdiction.

Members who wish to ask general or themed questions, or questions of the First Minister, must lodge them with parliamentary clerks beforehand and selections are made by the Presiding Officer. Written questions may also be submitted by members to ministers. Written questions and answers are published in the Official Report.

The first session of Leaders' Virtual Question Time, or virtual First Minister's Questions, was held on 9 April 2020 during the COVID-19 pandemic.

== Members, constituencies and voting systems ==
Result of the 2026 election, showing both constituency and regional results.

Elections for the Scottish Parliament were amongst the first in Britain to use a mixed-member proportional representation (MMP) system. The system is a regionalized form of MMP, known as the additional-member system (AMS) of proportional representation in Britain. Under the system, voters are given two votes: one for a specific candidate and one for a political party. The one vote is used to elect the local member; the other is grouped with votes from other districts in the region to compose party-proportional representation within the region. (There are no overall levelling seats.)

Of the 129 MSPs, 73 are elected to represent first-past-the-post constituencies and are known as "Constituency MSPs". Voters choose one member to represent the constituency, and the member with most votes is returned as a constituency MSP. The 73 Scottish Parliament constituencies shared the same boundaries as the UK Parliament constituencies in Scotland, prior to the 2005 reduction in the number of Scottish MPs, with the exception of Orkney and Shetland which each return their own constituency MSP. Currently, the average Scottish Parliament constituency comprises 55,000 electors. Given the geographical distribution of population in Scotland, this results in constituencies of a smaller area in the Central Lowlands, where the bulk of Scotland's population live, and much larger constituency areas in the north and west of the country, which have a low population density. The island archipelagos of Orkney, Shetland and the Western Isles comprise a much smaller number of electors, due to their dispersed population. If a constituency MSP resigns from Parliament, this triggers a by-election in his or her constituency, where a replacement MSP is returned by the plurality system.

The remaining 56 MSPs, called "List MSPs", are elected by an additional members system, which seeks to make the overall results more proportional, countering any distortions in the constituency results. Seven list MSPs are elected from each of eight electoral regions, of which constituencies are sub-divisions:

- Central Scotland and Lothians West
- Edinburgh and Lothians East
- Glasgow
- Highlands and Islands
- Mid Scotland and Fife
- North East Scotland
- South Scotland
- West Scotland

The 2003 election's 129 Members of the Scottish Parliament; 73 represented individual constituencies and 56 represented eight additional member regions

Each political party draws up a list of candidates standing in each electoral region, from which the list MSPs are elected. Independents can also stand in regions, in which case they are treated as a one-person "list". Candidates can stand for both a constituency and a list; should they be elected for a constituency, this takes precedence and they are skipped over when apportioning seats from their party list. If a list MSP later leaves the Parliament, the next person on the resigning MSPs' party's list takes the seat. Should a list MSP leave their party, however, they retain their seat and are not replaced. If an independent list MSP leaves the Parliament, they are not replaced and the seat is left vacant until the next general election.

The total number of seats in the Parliament is allocated to parties proportionally to the number of votes received in the second vote of the ballot using the d'Hondt method. For example, to determine who is awarded the first list seat, the number of list votes cast for each party is divided by one plus the number of seats the party won in the region (at this point just constituency seats). The party with the highest quotient is awarded the seat, which is then added to its constituency seats in allocating the second seat. This is repeated iteratively until all available list seats are allocated. As the allocation of seats to parties mirrors the popular vote, it is commonplace for the most successful party in the election not to win an outright majority of the seats, thereby requiring them to seek some form and level of cross-party support for their initiatives in government. Nonetheless, the 2011 election saw the SNP become the first–and to date, only–party to win a majority government.

As in the House of Commons, a number of qualifications apply to being an MSP. Such qualifications were introduced under the House of Commons Disqualification Act 1975 and the British Nationality Act 1981. Specifically, members must be over the age of 18 and must be a citizen of the United Kingdom, Ireland, one of the countries in the Commonwealth of Nations, a citizen of a British overseas territory, or a European Union citizen resident in the UK. Members of the police and the armed forces are disqualified from sitting in the Scottish Parliament as elected MSPs, and similarly, civil servants and members of foreign legislatures are disqualified. From the 2026 Scottish Parliament election onwards, MSPs will no longer be permitted to hold dual mandates, meaning they cannot be MPs, members of the House of Lords, or councillors. While several members of the original Scottish Parliament held seats at Westminster, this practice became more rare; between 2011-2026, only one MSP had served concurrently as an MP for a significant period of time.

== Elections ==
Elections for the Scottish Parliament are for all 129 seats using the Additional Member System. There have been seven elections to the Parliament, in 1999, 2003, 2007, 2011, 2016, 2021 and 2026.

Under the Scotland Act 1998 as originally passed, ordinary general elections for the Scottish Parliament were held on the first Thursday in May every four years (1999, 2003, 2007 and 2011); From 2011 onwards, they are held on the first Thursday in May every five years (2016, 2021, 2026 and so on).

In May 2010, the Cameron–Clegg coalition government stated in its coalition agreement that the next United Kingdom general election would be held in May 2015, a date for which a Scottish Parliament election was scheduled under the original Scotland Act. This proposal was criticised by the Scottish National Party and Labour, as it had been recommended after the 2007 election that elections with different voting systems should be held on separate days: a recommendation which all of the political parties had then accepted. In response to this criticism, Deputy Prime Minister Nick Clegg offered the right to vary the date of the Scottish Parliament election by a year either way. All the main political parties then stated their support for delaying the election by a year, to 2016. The Fixed-term Parliaments Act 2011, a statute of the UK Parliament, moved the date of the Scottish Parliament election to 5 May 2016 as a one-time exception; this would have made the problem of a clashing election date recur for the next UK general election, which was projected to be held in 2020 (Note: An early UK election was called in 2017, rendering the problem moot; however, even if the Scottish Parliament election remained scheduled for 2020, it would have likely been postponed to 2021 anyway due to the COVID-19 pandemic, as the 2020 United Kingdom local elections were.). For that reason, in November 2015, the Scottish Government published a Scottish Elections (Dates) Bill, which proposed to permanently extend the term of the Parliament to five years with effect from the 2016 Scottish Parliament election. That Bill was passed by the Scottish Parliament on 25 February 2016 and received Royal Assent on 30 March 2016. The date of the poll can be brought forwards by up to 4 weeks or delayed by up to 8 weeks by the Monarch on the proposal of the Presiding Officer.

If the Parliament itself resolves that it should be dissolved (with at least two-thirds of the Members voting in favour), or if the Parliament fails to nominate one of its members to be First Minister within 28 days of a General Election or of the position becoming vacant, the Presiding Officer proposes a date for an extraordinary general election and the Parliament is dissolved by the Monarch by royal proclamation. Extraordinary general elections are in addition to ordinary general elections, unless held less than six months before the due date of an ordinary general election, in which case they supplant it. The following ordinary election reverts to the first Thursday in May, a multiple of five years after 2016 (i.e., 6 May 2021, 7 May 2026, etc.).

Citizens of the UK, Ireland, EU member states and other countries who have permission to enter or remain in the UK (or who do not need such permission), and are resident in Scotland, are entitled to vote. The minimum voting age is 16. This differs from elections to the Westminster parliament, which are restricted to citizens of the UK, Ireland and qualifying Commonwealth citizens, with a minimum voting age of 18. Citizens of other non-Commonwealth EU member states who are resident in Scotland have been entitled to vote in elections to the Scottish Parliament since 1999. Since this date, the franchise has been further extended, with a two-thirds majority being required to make changes to the franchise under the Scotland Act 2016. From the 2016 election, the franchise for Scottish Parliament elections was expanded to include 16- and 17-year-olds. In 2020, the Scottish Parliament voted to extend the right to vote in Scotland to all foreign nationals with leave to remain (limited or indefinite).

== Criticism ==
The resignation of Henry McLeish as First Minister, brought on by an office expenses scandal, generated controversy in the first years of the Scottish Parliament. Various academics have written on how the Scottish Parliament can be improved as a governing institution.

=== West Lothian question ===
As a consequence of the establishment of the Scottish Parliament, Scottish MPs sitting in the UK House of Commons are able to vote on domestic legislation that applies only to England, Wales, and Northern Ireland – whilst English, Scottish, Welsh and Northern Irish Westminster MPs are unable to vote on the domestic legislation of the Scottish Parliament. This phenomenon is known as the West Lothian question and has led to criticism. Following the Conservative victory in the 2015 UK election, standing orders of the House of Commons were changed to give MPs representing English constituencies a new "veto" over laws only affecting England, known as English votes for English laws. The mechanism was abolished in 2021.

=== Abolition ===
Parties such as the Abolish the Scottish Parliament Party, the UK Independence Party (UKIP), and Scottish Unionist Party (SUP) have advocated abolition of the Scottish Parliament.

== Bibliography ==
- Balfour, A. & McCrone, G. (2005): Creating a Scottish Parliament, StudioLR, ISBN 0-9550016-0-9
- Burrows, N. (1999): "Unfinished Business – The Scotland Act 1998", Modern Law Review, Vol. 62, No. 2 (March 1999), pp. 241–260
- Dardanelli, P. (2005): Between Two Unions: Europeanisation and Scottish Devolution, Manchester University Press, ISBN 0-7190-7080-5
- Hassan, Gerry (1999): A Guide to the Scottish Parliament: The Shape of Things to Come, The Stationery Office", ISBN 0-11-497231-1
- Hassan, Gerry (2019): The Story of the Scottish Parliament: The First Two Decades Explained, Edinburgh University Press, ISBN 978-1-4744-5490-2
- Kingdom, J. (1999): Government and Politics in Britain, An Introduction, Polity, ISBN 0-7456-1720-4
- MacLean, B. (2005): Getting It Together: Scottish Parliament, Luath Press Ltd, ISBN 1-905222-02-5
- McFadden, J. & Lazarowicz, M. (2003): The Scottish Parliament: An Introduction, LexisNexis UK, ISBN 0-406-96957-4
- Murkens, E.; Jones, P. & Keating, M. (2002): Scottish Independence: A Practical Guide, Edinburgh University Press, ISBN 0-7486-1699-3
- Taylor, Brian (1999): The Scottish Parliament, Polygon, Edinburgh, ISBN 1-902930-12-6
- Taylor, Brian (2002): The Scottish Parliament: The Road to Devolution, Edinburgh University Press, ISBN 0-7486-1759-0
- Young, John R. (1996): The Scottish Parliament, 1639–1661: A Political and Constitutional, Edinburgh: John Donald Publishers ISBN 0-85976-412-5
