= Scottish Housing News =

- Type: Daily news website
- Publisher: Dundee Press Agency Ltd T/A Scottish News Agency
- Editor: Kieran Findlay; Graham Ogilvy (managing)
- Founded: 2001
- Readership: 35,000

Scottish Housing News is a daily digital news service for Scotland's affordable housing sector, which comprises housing associations, local councils, government and charities.

The service is sponsored by the Chartered Institute of Housing in Scotland and the Glasgow and West of Scotland Forum of housing associations.

Its sister publication, Scottish Construction Now, is also published by Dundee Press Agency.
