= Homelessness in Scotland =

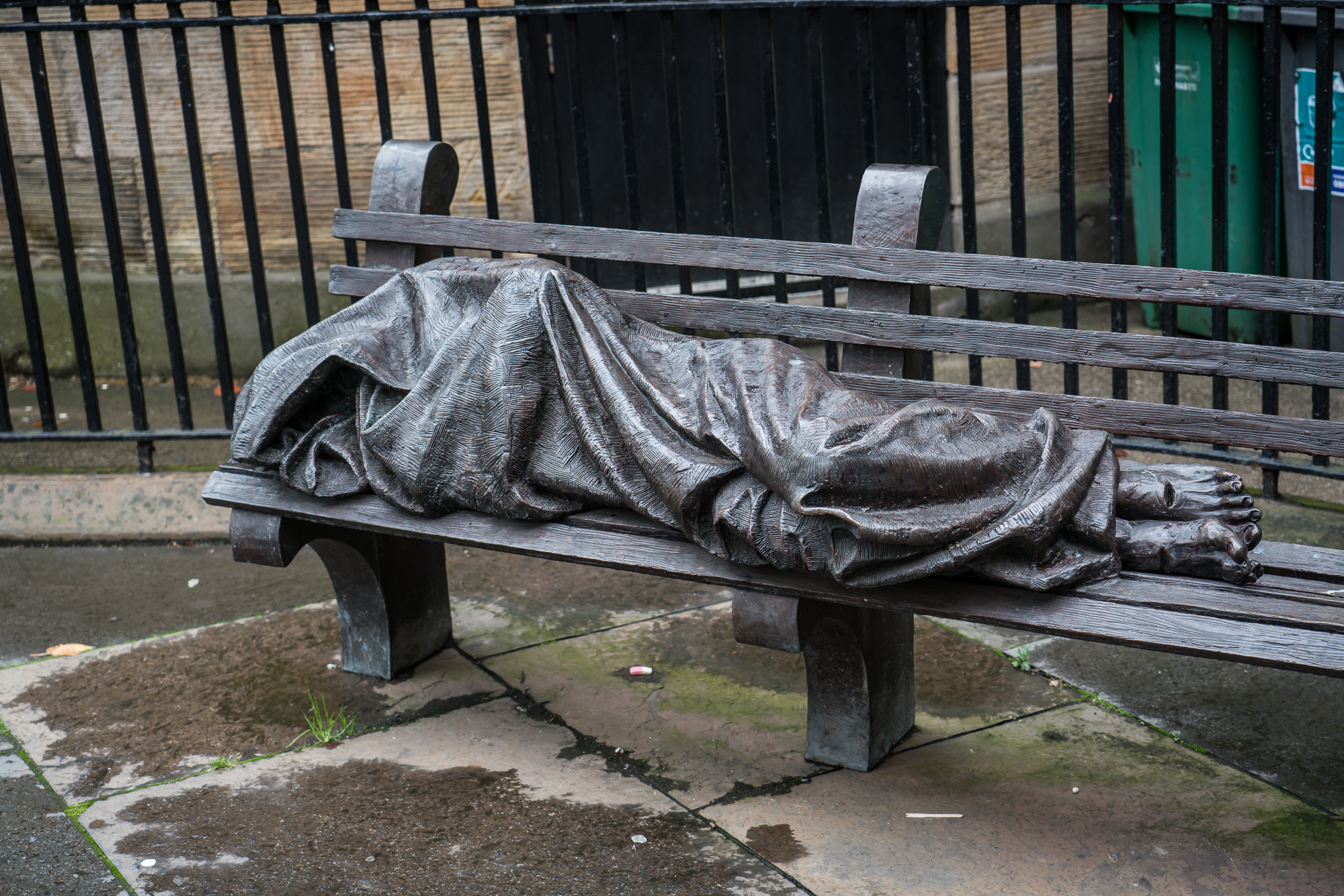
Homeless Jesus statue in Glasgow

In Scotland, the Scottish Government has overall and legislative responsibility for homelessness policy and legislation, whilst local councils have a statutory duty to assist in providing settled accommodation to applicants, or, if settled accommodation is unavailable at the time an application is received, then temporary accommodation must be provided until settled accommodation is available. Since the introduction of Scottish devolution in 1999 and the reconvening of the Scottish Parliament, homeless legislation and policy in Scotland has diverged in important ways from the rest of the UK. Homelessness legislation and policy is fully devolved to the Scottish Government under the terms of the Scotland Act 1998 and has full legislative competence to legislate in the area.

The most recent statistics issued by the Scottish Government on homelessness in the country include:

- 40,685 homelessness applications were received between 2023–2024. This marked an increase of 4% compared to the previous years of 2022–2023 (39,308).
- 31,423 homelessness cases were closed between 2023–2024. This marked an increase of 9% compared to 2022–2023 (28,772).
- a total of 31,870 open homelessness cases recognised by the Scottish Government as of 31 March 2024. This marked an increase of 8% compared to 2023 (29,408).
- 33,619 households were assessed as homeless, containing 38,075 adults and 15,474 children

The characteristics of households in Scotland which were assessed as being homeless, or threatened with homelessness either through intentional or unintentional measures were 63% were aged 25 to 49, 68% of households are single person, 26% contain children, 80% were of white ethnicity and 51% have at least one support need. When a household in Scotland is either unintentionally homeless or threatened with homelessness, the local authority has a statutory duty to offer settled accommodation. The local authority must offer temporary accommodation is settled accommodation is unavailable at the time, and once settled accommodation becomes available, an applicant will moved from temporary to settled accommodation.

== Acts of Parliament ==
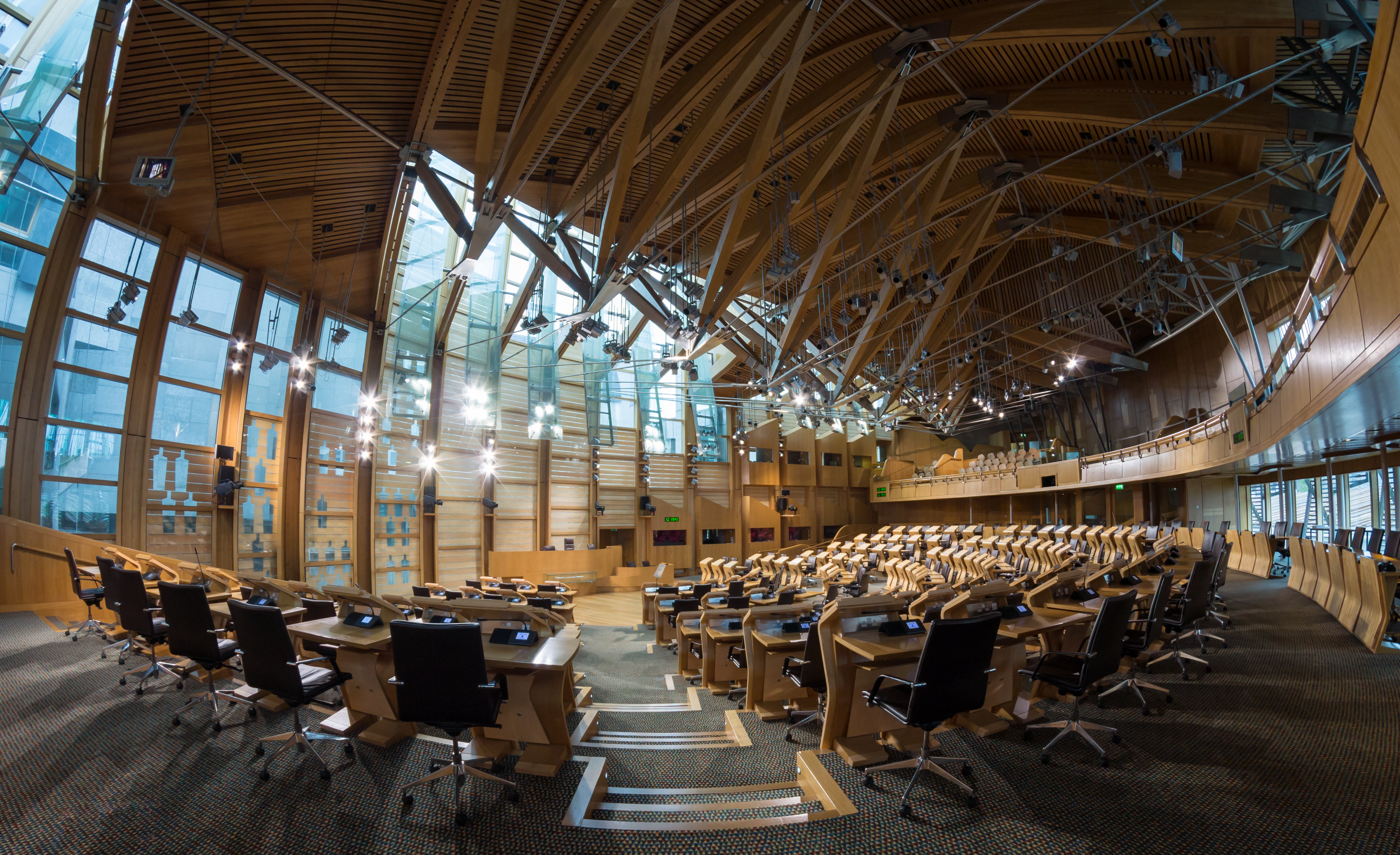
The Scottish Government and Scottish Parliament (pictured) legislates in all areas of homelessness policy in Scotland.

The Scottish Parliament passed the Housing (Scotland) Act 2001 which was introduced to create changes to existing homelessness legislation. The act established the right to review a homelessness decision and introduced a duty on registered social landlords (RSLs) to assist local authorities across Scotland individuals who found themselves homeless.

The Scottish Parliament passed the Homelessness etc. (Scotland) Act 2003 which has an aim of ensuring that by 2012 everyone assessed as being unintentionally homeless will be entitled to permanent accommodation. In addition, the Homeless Persons (Unsuitable Accommodation) (Scotland) Order 2004 came into force in December 2004 and requires councils to ensure that pregnant women and households with children are not placed in unsuitable temporary accommodation, unless there are exceptional circumstances. In 2012, the Scottish Parliament passed secondary legislation on housing support services. The 2012 legislation required local authorities in Scotland to assess housing support needs of homeless applicants within their respective areas.

On 29 November 2022, the Scottish Parliament passed the Homeless Persons (Suspension of Referrals between Local Authorities) (Scotland) Order 2022. The 2022 legislation suspends referrals between Scottish local authorities for homeless households on the basis of their local connection. This means that the act gives people in housing crisis the freedom to settle where they choose with access to the support they need, and aims to help them integrate more fully into the local community and to reduce repeat homelessness.

Acts of the Scottish Parliament which relate to homelessness include:

- Housing (Scotland) Act 1987
- Housing (Scotland) Act 2001
- Homelessness etc. (Scotland) Act 2003
- Homeless (Abolition of Priority Need Test) (Scotland) Order 2012
- The Housing Support Services (Homelessness) (Scotland) Regulations 2012
- The Homeless Persons (Unsuitable Accommodation) (Scotland) Amendment Order 2020
- Homeless Persons (Suspension of Referrals between Local Authorities) (Scotland) Order 2022

== Scottish Government policy ==
The Scottish Government has pledged to commit £100 million in funding in order to transform the homelessness system and implement the governments updated Ending Homelessness Together action plan, preventing homelessness from happening in the first place, transforming temporary accommodation by transitioning to rapid rehousing by default and ending the use of night shelters by expanding rapid rehousing approaches, such as Housing First, working to reduce the use of and time spent in temporary accommodation, providing annual updates, as well as homelessness statistics twice a year, to monitor the progress of the Scottish Government towards ending homelessness.

Paul McLennan is the incumbent Minister for Housing within the Scottish Government. The housing minister supports the Cabinet Secretary for Social Justice and is directly responsible for homelessness and rough sleeping, the Housing to 2040 strategy, welfare and debt advice and the Affordable Housing Supply Programme.

== Role of local councils ==
If a household becomes unintentionally homeless or is threatened with homelessness, Scottish local councils have a stature duty to offer settled accommodation to applicants. If settled accommodation is unavailable at the time an application is received, the council must offer temporary accommodation. If a household is intentionally homeless, the local authority has no statutory duty to provide settled accommodation to applications, however, local councils may choose to do so. Local councils do have a duty to provide temporary accommodation, advice and assistance to assist the household secure alternative accommodation. Temporary accommodation must be offered to all households while awaiting an assessment decision.

The overall statutory duty lies with the local authority the household is situated within. Until 28 November 2022, it was the case that if a household had no local connection to the local authority to which it applied for homelessness accommodation, but rather to another local authority in Scotland, they may be referred to the local authority they were connected with. However, from 29 November 2022, local authorities no longer have the authority to refer an applicant to another local authority in Scotland on the grounds of their local connection.

Ultimately, a household can accept or refuse any offers of accommodation put to them by the local authority. A local authority’s duty to secure accommodation for unintentionally homeless people would be fulfilled by an offer that is refused, provided that the offer is reasonable and meets the standards required for the applicant.

== Statistics ==
According to Shelter, in 2019-20, 31,333 households were assessed as being homeless, which is a 4% increase on 2018-19. 51,365 people were in those households; 35,654 adults and 15,711 children. The number of households accepted as homeless or potentially homeless has increased by 25 per cent since 2000-2001 according to Shelter. There are various organisations which have been set up in order to combat homelessness and poverty in Scotland such as Glasgow Needy, Glasgow City Mission. These organisation offer food to the homeless as they are touched by deprivation of poverty. By March 2024, the number of children living in temporary accommodation had decreased from 15,711 children in 2020 to 10,110 children in 2024.

As at 30 September 2020, 14,151 households were in temporary accommodation (a 24% increase from 2019–20). Among these households are 7,280 children. There were 4,595 instances where temporary accommodation was not offered and 500 breaches of the unsuitable accommodation order.

By 2024, 1,311 households across Scotland (4%) that had previously been assessed as homeless in the 12 months prior to their most recent assessments were found to have re-entered the homelessness system, and 3,905 (12%) in the last five years had re-entered the homelessness system.

In 2025, Shelter reported that there were more children in temporary accommodation in Edinburgh than the whole of Wales. This was later raised at Prime Minister's Questions by Labour MP Chris Murray, who characterised it as "appalling".

== Causes ==
Shelter Scotland identified lack of social housing, pressure of private renting, discrimination and inequality and unexpected life events as the most common causes of homelessness in Scotland.

Statistics are based upon all people or households who approach their local authority (council) and state they are homeless, or about to be homeless within the next two months. These statistics are sent to the Scottish Government, who produce these every six months. The statistics do not include people who are homeless but do not go to their local authority.

== See also ==
- Scottish Housing Regulator

History:

- Impotent poor
- Poor laws
- Deinstitutionalisation

General:

- Glasgow effect
- Homelessness in the United Kingdom
- Squatting in Scotland
