= Scottish Housing Regulator =

UK government agency

Agency overview
- Formed: 1 April 2011
- Type: Non-ministerial government department
- Jurisdiction: Scotland
- Headquarters: 5th Floor, 220 High Street, Glasgow G4 0QW
- Employees: 53
- Annual budget: £5.3 million (2023–2024)
- Minister responsible: Paul McLennan, Minister for Housing
- Agency executives: George Walker, Chair; Michael Cameron, Chief Executive
- Website: https://www.housingregulator.gov.scot/

The Scottish Housing Regulator (SHR) (Scottish Gaelic: Riaghladair Taigheadais na h-Alba) is the regulator of social housing in Scotland. SHR is an independent non-ministerial department, directly accountable to the Scottish Parliament. The body was established on 1 April 2011 under the Housing (Scotland) Act 2010.

SHR is the successor to the previous executive agency of the same name, which exercised Scottish Ministers' powers under the Housing (Scotland) Act 2001.

The statutory objective of SHR is to:

safeguard and promote the interests of current and future tenants of social landlords, people who are or may become homeless, and people who use housing services provided by Registered Social Landlords (RSLs) and local authorities

SHR regulates social landlords to protect the interests of people who receive services from them. SHR does this by assessing and reporting on; how social landlords are performing their housing services, RSLs' financial well-being and RSLs' standards of governance and where necessary SHR will intervene to secure improvements.

SHR also keeps a Register of all the RSLs in Scotland. The register holds information about each landlord including their contact details and their regulation plans.

In June 2015 SHR won two awards for its IT systems in recognition of its efforts to make information available to tenants to allow them to hold their landlords to account.

== See also ==
- Homelessness in Scotland
- Housing and Regeneration Directorate
- Local government of Scotland
