= Communities Directorates =

Scottish group of civil service Directorates

The Communities Directorates (Scottish Gaelic: Buidheann-stiùiridh nan Coimhearsnachdan) are a group of civil service Directorates in the Scottish Government. The individual Directorates within the overarching Communities Directorates report to the Director-General, Louise MacDonald.

== History ==
The Governance and Communities Directorates were created by a December 2010 re-organisation, with Paul Gray appointed as the Director-General. In June 2014, Sarah Davidson was appointed as Director-General, with the group of Directorates now simply referred to as "Communities".

== Ministers ==
There is no direct relationship between Ministers and the Directorates. However, in general, the activities of the Directorates include those under the purview of the Cabinet Secretary for Social Justice, Shirley-Anne Somerville MSP. She is assisted in this work by the Minister for Equalities, Migration and Refugees, the Minister for Local Government Empowerment and Planning and the Minister for Housing.

== Directorates ==
The overarching Scottish Government Directorates were preceded by similar structures called "Departments" that no longer exist (although the word is still sometimes used in this context). As an overarching unit, the Communities Directorates incorporate a number of individual Directorates entitled:

- Equality, Inclusion and Human Rights - Director: Alison Byrne
- Local Government and Housing - Director: Sean Neill
- Public Service Reform - Director: Mary McAllan
- Social Security - Director: Stephen Kerr
- Tackling Child Poverty and Social Justice - Director: Shirley Laing
- Ukraine Resettlement - Interim Director: Miriam Craven

The individual Directorates are headed by Directors who are assisted by Deputy Directors.
