= Victoria Harbour (disambiguation) =

The main Victoria Harbour is in Hong Kong but may refer to:

== Australia ==
- Docklands, Victoria, an inner city suburb in Melbourne, Victoria

== Canada ==
- Tay, Ontario, a township which encompasses the hamlet of Victoria Harbour
- Victoria Harbour (British Columbia), a harbour, seaport, and seaplane airport
- Victoria Harbour, Nova Scotia, a community

== See also ==
- Port of Victoria (disambiguation)
- Port Victoria (disambiguation)
- Victoria Quay (disambiguation)
