= Scottish Government =

Devolved government of Scotland

- Scottish Gaelic: Riaghaltas na h-Alba; Scots: Scots Govrenment
- Devolved government

Overview
- Established: 1 July 1999; 27 years ago
- Country: Scotland
- Leader: First Minister (John Swinney)
- Appointed by: First Minister nominated by Parliament and appointed by the monarch. Ministers by the First Minister pending parliamentary approval.
- Main organ: Scottish Cabinet
- Ministries: 56 government directorates 131 public bodies 10 executive agencies 46 non–executive agencies
- Responsible to: Scottish Parliament
- Annual budget: £67.9 billion (2026–27)
- Headquarters: St Andrew's House, Edinburgh
- Website: www.gov.scot

The Scottish Government (Scottish Gaelic: Riaghaltas na h-Alba, pronounced [ˈrˠiə.əl̪ˠt̪əs nə ˈhal̪ˠapə]) is the devolved government of Scotland. It was formed in 1999 as the Scottish Executive following the 1997 referendum on Scottish devolution, and is headquartered at St Andrew's House in the capital city, Edinburgh. It has full legislative control over a number of areas, including education, healthcare, justice and the legal system, rural affairs, housing, the crown estate, the environment, emergency services, equal opportunities, public transport, and tax, amongst others.

The Scottish Government consists of the Scottish Ministers, which is the term used to describe their collective legal functions. The Scottish Government is accountable to the Scottish Parliament, which was also created by the Scotland Act 1998. The first minister is nominated by Parliament, then formally appointed by the monarch. The Scotland Act 1998 makes provision for ministers and junior ministers, referred to by the current administration as cabinet secretaries and ministers, in addition to two law officers: the Lord Advocate and the Solicitor General for Scotland. The first minister selects ministers from the body of serving members of the Scottish Parliament, after which their appointment is approved by Parliament and the monarch.

Collectively the Scottish Ministers and the Civil Service staff that support the Scottish Government are formally referred to as the Scottish Administration. The Scottish Cabinet consists of the first minister and their deputy, cabinet secretaries, the law officers, the permanent secretary and Minister for Parliamentary Business.

== History ==
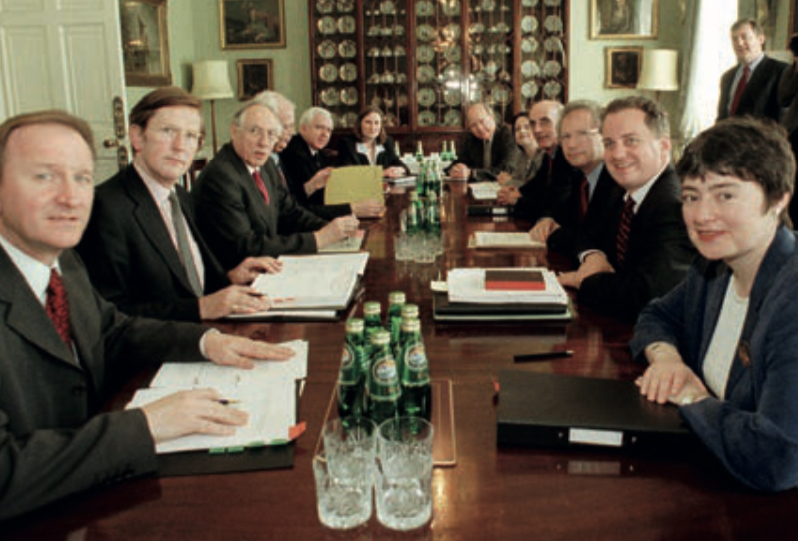
Following the Scotland Act 1998, Donald Dewar became First Minister in the first Scottish parliament since 1707

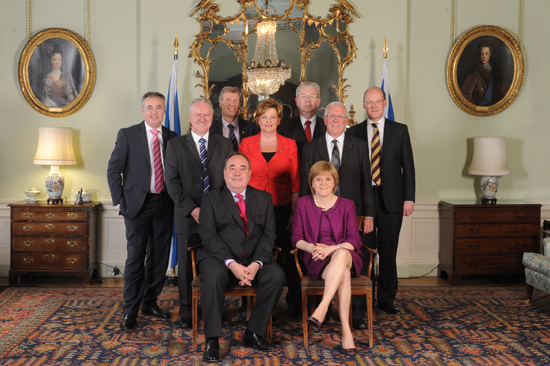
The Second Salmond government (2011–2014) was the first single party-majority Scottish Government

The Labour Party included the creation of a devolved Scottish Parliament in its manifesto for the 1997 UK general election. Tony Blair won a landslide victory, with a majority of 179. Blair then held a referendum on Scottish devolution in September 1997, with 1,775,045 people (74.2%) voting in favour in contrast to 614,400 (25.7%) voting against the proposal. The referendum result was recognised, and the Scotland Act 1998 created the Scottish Parliament and Scottish Executive, with many of the functions of the Scottish Office and the Secretary of State for Scotland being transferred to the new Executive. The new parliament and executive were also to have control over tax varying powers, and full legislative control over areas such as healthcare, education, policing, Scots law, environment, housing, local government, culture and some aspects of transportation, amongst others.

Subsequently, the Scotland Acts of 2012 and 2016 transferred powers over some taxation including Income Tax, Land and Buildings Transaction Tax, Landfill Tax, Aggregates Levy and Air Departure Tax, drink driving limits, Scottish Parliament and local authority elections, some social security powers, the Crown Estate of Scotland, some aspects of the benefits system, some aspects of the energy network in Scotland including renewable energy, energy efficiency and onshore oil and gas licensing, some aspects of equality legislation in Scotland and gaming machine licensing.

The first Scottish Executive was formed by First Minister Donald Dewar as a coalition between the Scottish Labour Party and the Scottish Liberal Democrats. During this period, ministerial appointees were divided into ministers and deputy ministers. The Labour-Liberal Democrat coalition continued under subsequent First Ministers Henry McLeish and Jack McConnell. Following the 2007 Scottish Parliament election, Alex Salmond became the first politician from the Scottish National Party to lead the Scottish Government. He became first minister in 2007 and served in office until his resignation in 2014, with his former deputy first minister, Nicola Sturgeon, succeeding him in November 2014.

In 2007, the administration of Alex Salmond began to use the name Scottish Government instead of Scottish Executive. The change of name was later recognised in United Kingdom legislation by the Scotland Act 2012. In 2001, former First Minister Henry McLeish had proposed such a change, but experienced some opposition. At the same time that the Scottish Government began to use its new name, a new emblem was adopted; it replaced the use of a version of the Royal Arms with the Flag of Scotland.

In 2012, the Scottish and UK Governments signed the Edinburgh Agreement, which outlined the terms for the Scottish Parliament to hold a single question referendum on the issue of whether Scotland should become an independent country again. The referendum was held on 18 September 2014. With record high voter turnout of 84.6%, the vote against independence won with 55.3%, while 44.7% voted in favour of independence. From 1 January 2021, the Scottish Government instructed all Scottish legislation be legally required to keep in regulatory alignment in devolved competences with future European Union law following the end of the Brexit transition period which ended on 31 December 2020 after the Scottish Parliament passed the UK Withdrawal from the European Union (Continuity) (Scotland) Act 2020.

The Scottish Government's main headquarters are based at St Andrew's House in the capital city, Edinburgh. Additionally, the Scottish Government has offices at Victoria Quay, Saughton House and Bute House (the official residence of the first minister), all in Edinburgh, with an additional office at 5 Atlantic Quay in Glasgow. All ministers and officials have access to Scotland House at Victoria Embankment in London, when necessary. Dover House on Whitehall is now used by the Scotland Office and the devolved Scottish ministers no longer use it.

== Functions ==
=== Parliament ===
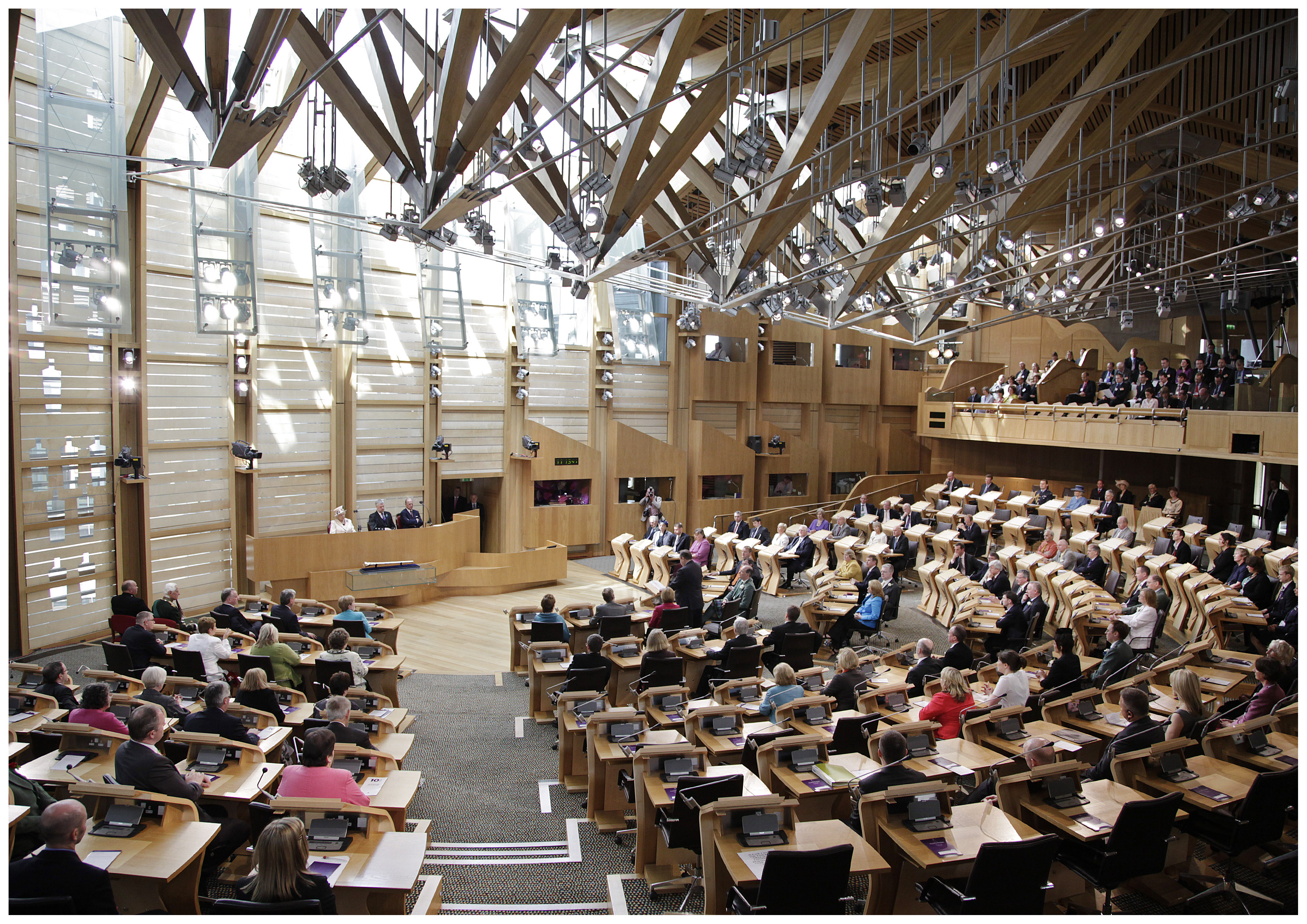
Bills introduced by the Scottish Government are debated in the Scottish Parliament, and must receive a majority in favour of a bill becoming law.

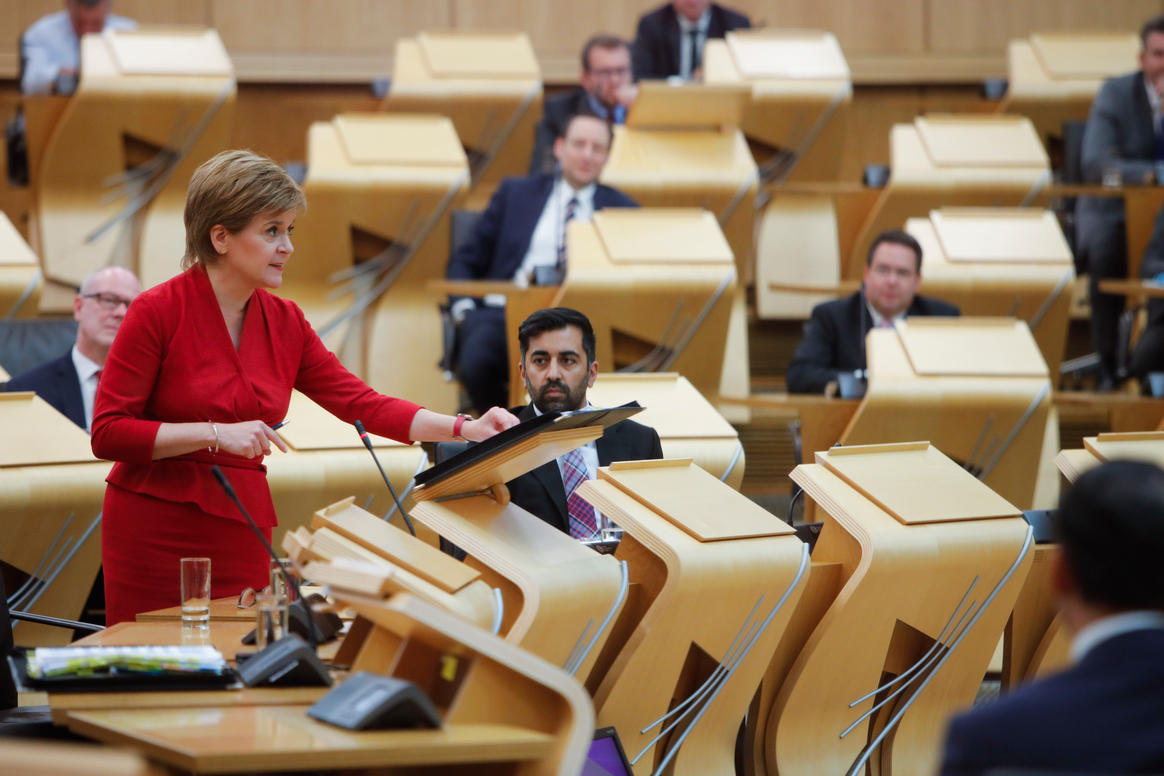
First Minister Nicola Sturgeon before the Scottish Parliament during First Minister's Questions

The Scottish Government is separate from the Scottish Parliament; parliament consists of 129 members (MSPs) elected by the Scottish electorate. The Scottish Parliament acts as the legislative body in areas for which the Scottish Government is responsible, called "devolved matters". The work of the Scottish Government, including proposed legislation, policies and activities, is scrutinised by parliament through a variety of different measures such as parliamentary debates, parliament committees and parliamentary questions to the appropriate Cabinet Secretary or government minister.

The Scottish Government is directly responsible for executing laws that have been approved by the Scottish Parliament. The party with the largest number of MSPs returned in parliamentary elections usually forms a government. As such, the Scottish Government is responsible for proposing most bills to the parliament for consideration and approval. If an overall majority in parliament approves a bill, it passes and is given royal assent by the monarch, becoming part of Scots law. Each law is sanctioned by the monarch using the Great Seal of Scotland.

Each year, the Scottish Government produces its annual budget for public spending which is presented to members of the Scottish Parliament for consideration. The Budget Bill is scrutinised by the parliamentary committees, and goes through three parliamentary stages before passing – a parliamentary debate on the general principles of the Budget Bill, any changes to the Budget Bill can be put forward to parliament by Scottish Government ministers, with such proposed changes being considered by the Finance and Constitution Committee, and lastly, MSPs determine whether any additional changes are required following the changes proposed by Scottish Government ministers, and members then vote on whether to pass the Bill. Similar to other acts of the Scottish Parliament, if the Budget Bill passes in the Scottish Parliament, it receives royal assent and becomes an Act of the Scottish Parliament.

Strategically, the first minister is the head of the Scottish Government, and not the head of the Scottish Parliament. The head of the Scottish Parliament is usually considered to be the presiding officer who is the speaker of the parliament and presides over all parliamentary business and debates. The Scottish Government is directly accountable to the Scottish Parliament, and both the government and parliament are directly accountable to the public of Scotland.

=== Legislation ===
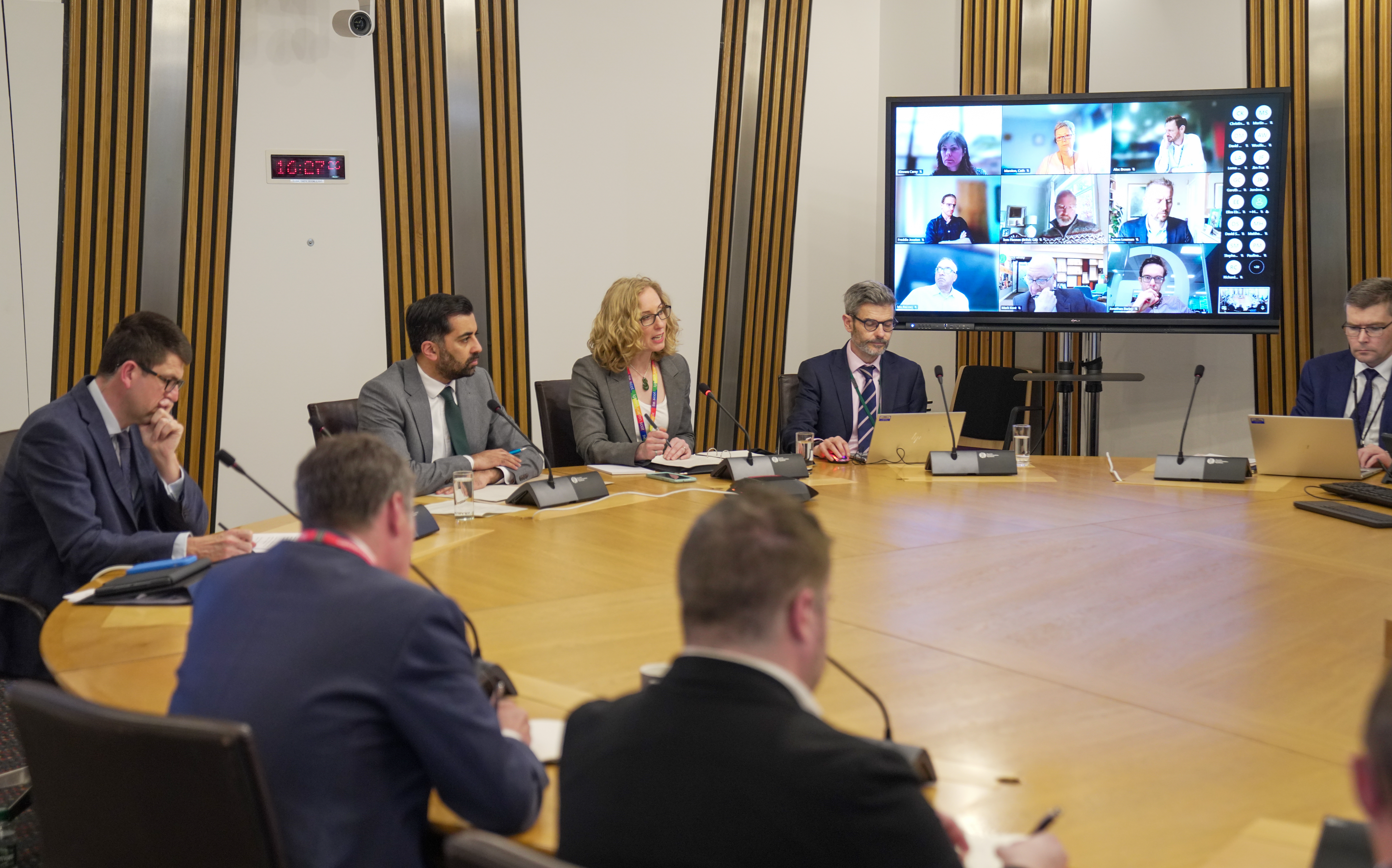
Proposed government legislation and government conduct can be scrutinised by parliamentary committees.

The majority of bills proposed to the Scottish Parliament come from the Scottish Government. The process for introducing bills to the parliament for consideration and debate commences with the government publishing and formulating policy. A bill will only become law in Scotland under Scots law once it has been approved by a majority of MSPs in the Scottish Parliament, where it will then be put to the Monarch to receive royal assent. Once royal assent has been given by the Monarch, the bill becomes a law of the Scottish Parliament and becomes embedded in Scots law.

Once a bill is successful in becoming law, the Scottish Government has the responsibility to ensure subordinate legislation, which often comes in the form of Scottish statutory instruments, is implemented accordingly so that the new law begins to work and that any additional measures and features can be added to make the law work and ensure its effective implementation and operation.

The Scottish Government produces a National Performance Framework (NPF) which sets out the government's priorities, objectives and overall vision for the country following election. First introduced in 2007, this framework acts a means to measure the performance of the government in eleven national outcome areas which include health, poverty, environment and education. It creates a pledge and commitment on the aspirations and aims that government wishes to create within the country, and serves as a means for the government to highlight national priorities and provides an opportunity for the government to evaluate its progress towards achieving the objectives as set out in the National Performance Framework. Each of the National Outcomes is measured by a number of indicators and associated data sets.

Similarly, the Programme for Government is published annually by the incumbent Scottish Government, and it highlights the government's policies, proposed actions and legislation that the government will seek to implement in the forthcoming year.

=== Statistics and transparency ===
The Scottish Government publishes statistics based on the majority of public life in Scotland, including, but not limited to, education, the economy, healthcare, population, death, marriages and births, as well as living standards. The government uses such statistics to evaluate its work against the data to gauge how successful, or unsuccessful, government policy is and whether it is having the desired impact.

To ensure accountability, the Scottish Government publishes information for public consumption to ensure the work of the Scottish Government is accessible and transparent for the public. It commits itself to publishing information in areas relating to the spending of public money and creating a breakdown of public spending, the work of senior civil servants in the Scottish Government, including their job titles and salaries, as well as government assessment against objectives to highlight how well the government is doing in achieving the targets and objectives it creates through the National Performance Framework and Programme for Government. Additionally, the Freedom of Information (Scotland) Act 2002 gives the public the right to ask for information relating to the Scottish Government, as well as other public sectors.

== Structure ==
The Scottish Government consists of a first minister, deputy first minister, a number of cabinet secretaries, and a number of other ministers. For statutory purposes, cabinet secretaries, including the deputy first minister, are known as "Ministers", other ministers are known as "junior Scottish Ministers", and the first minister and all of the cabinet secretaries collectively are known as "the Scottish Ministers". Cabinet secretaries are members of the Scottish Cabinet, while other ministers do not usually attend cabinet.

Additionally, the Scottish Government is supported by a permanent secretary, two law officers – the Lord Advocate and the Solicitor General for Scotland – who serve as the chief legal advisers to the government, and the Chief of Staff to the First Minister, as well as several other government officials, personal secretaries and advisers to the Scottish Government and the first minister.

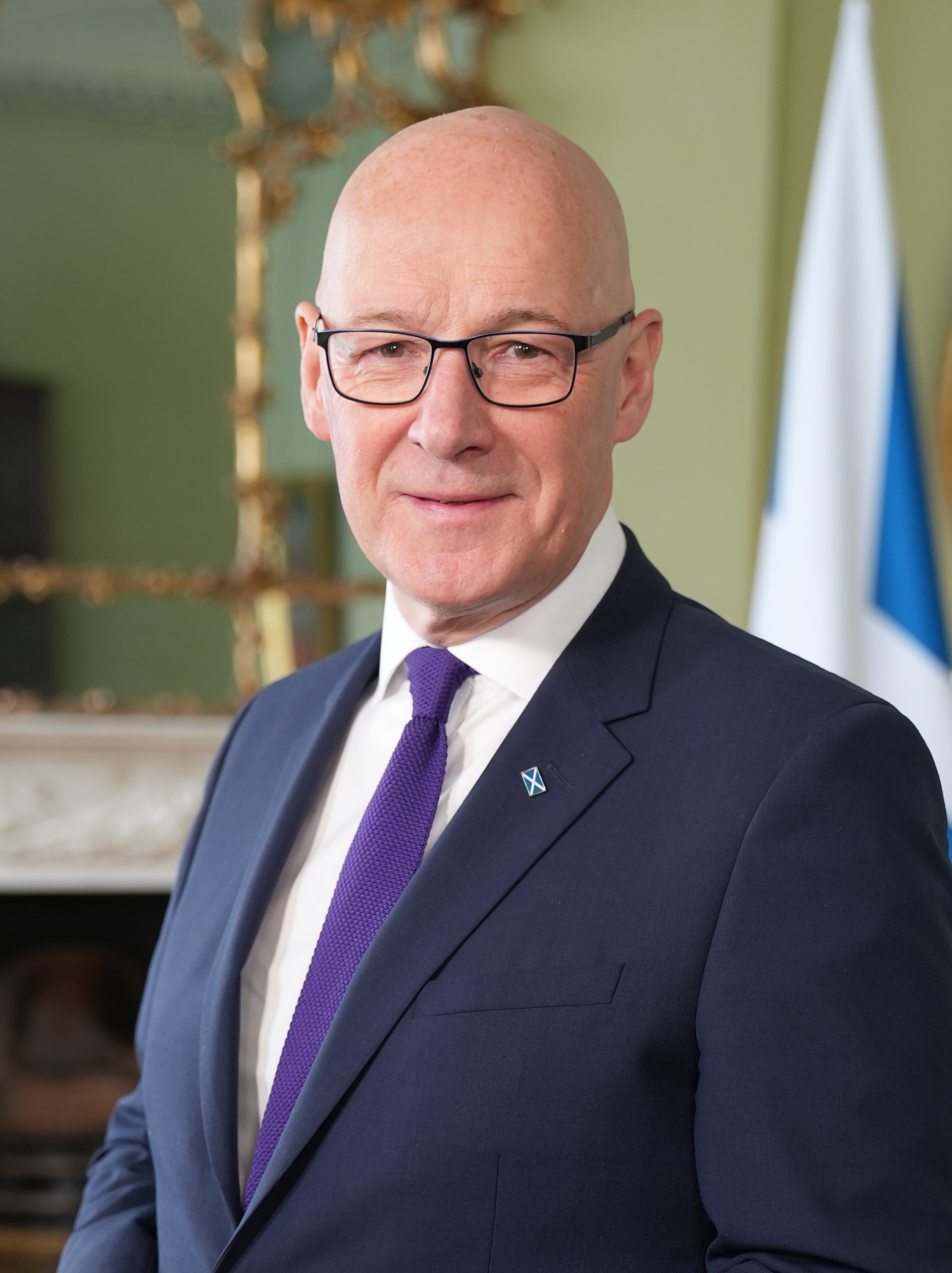
John Swinney (SNP)
First Minister and Keeper of the Great Seal

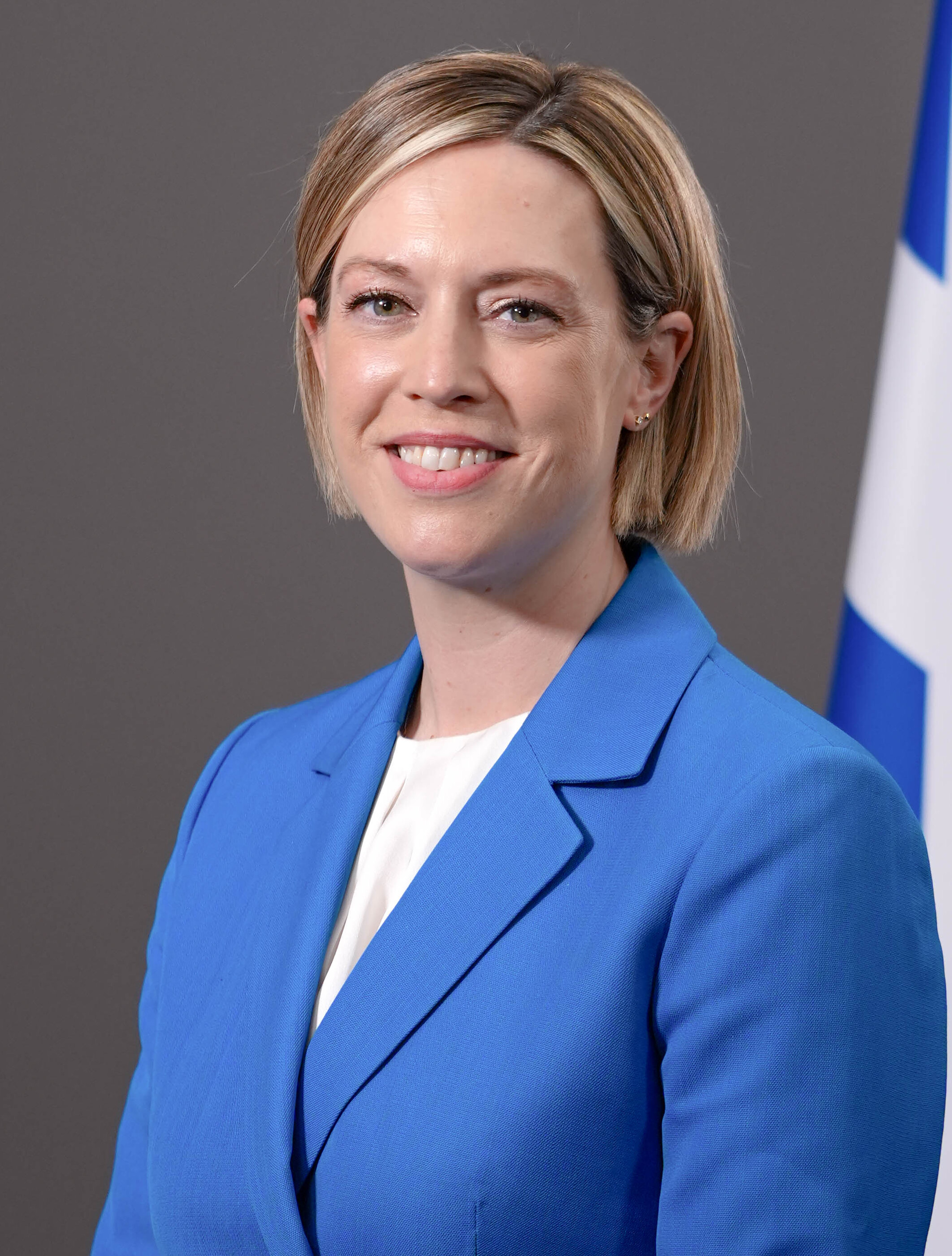
Jenny Gilruth (SNP)
Deputy First Minister and Cabinet Secretary for Finance and Local Government

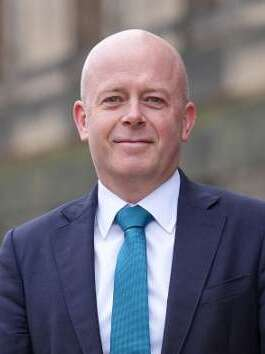
Joe Griffin
Permanent Secretary

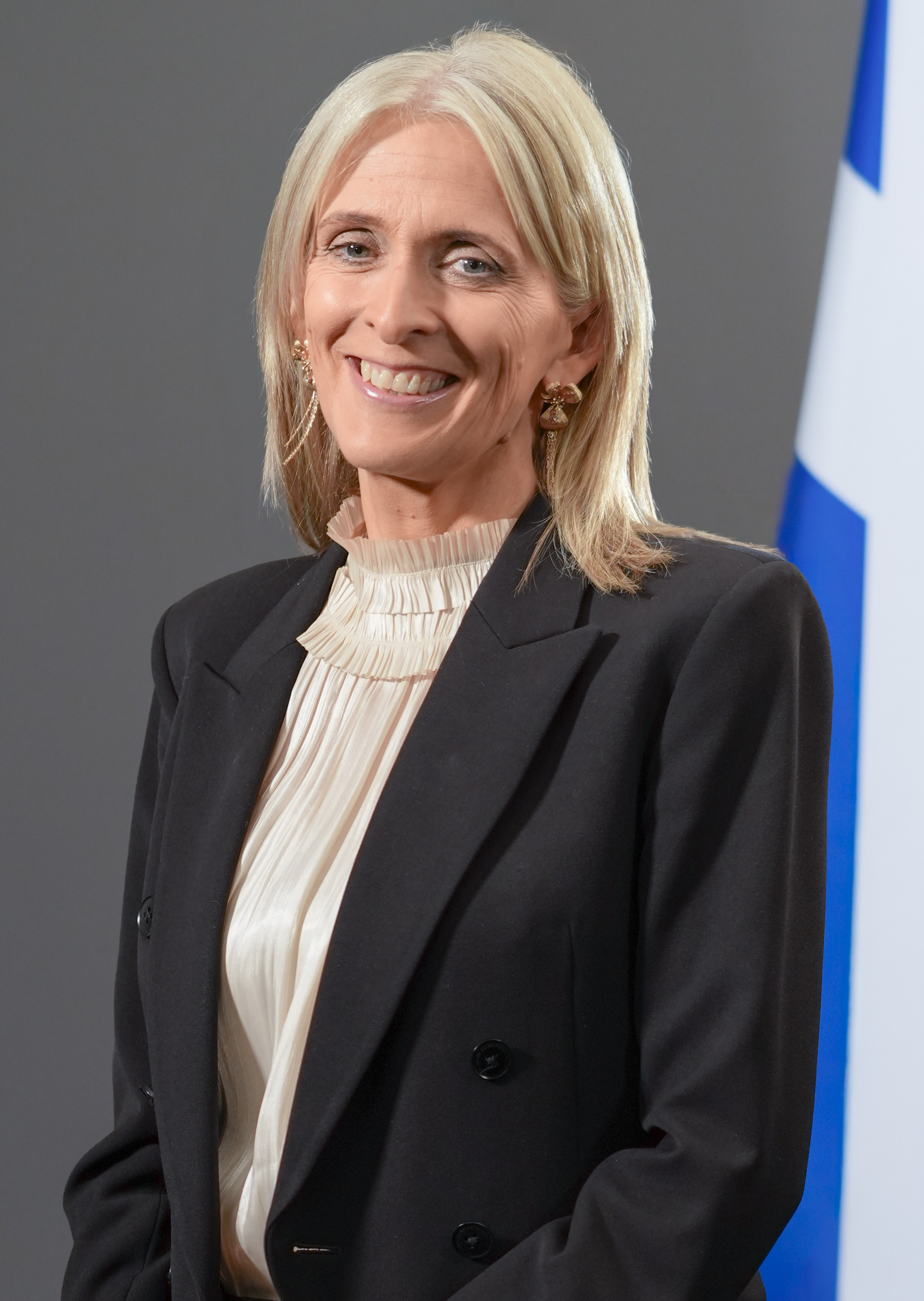
Ruth Charteris
Lord Advocate

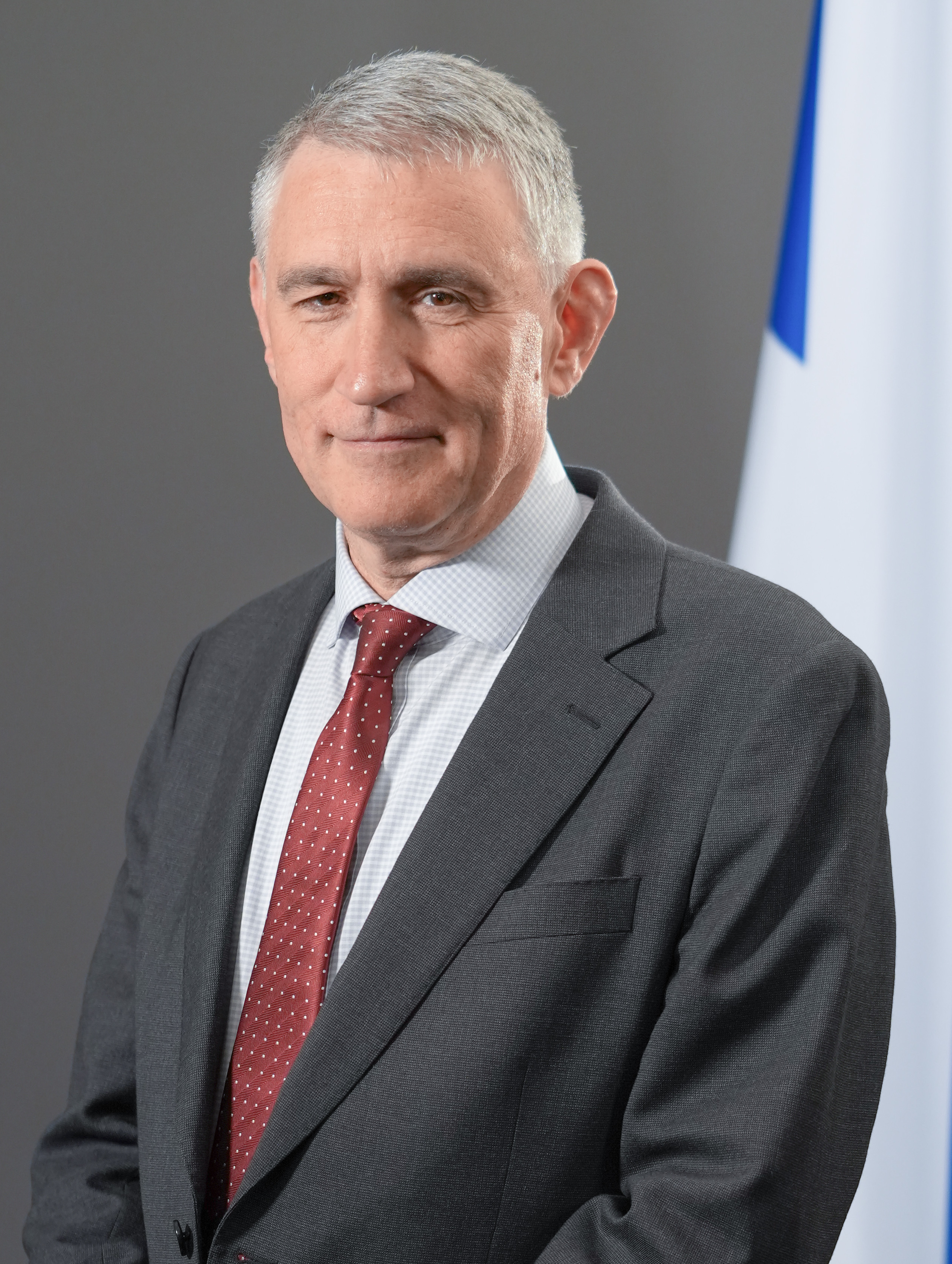
B. J. Gill
Solicitor General for Scotland

=== First Minister ===
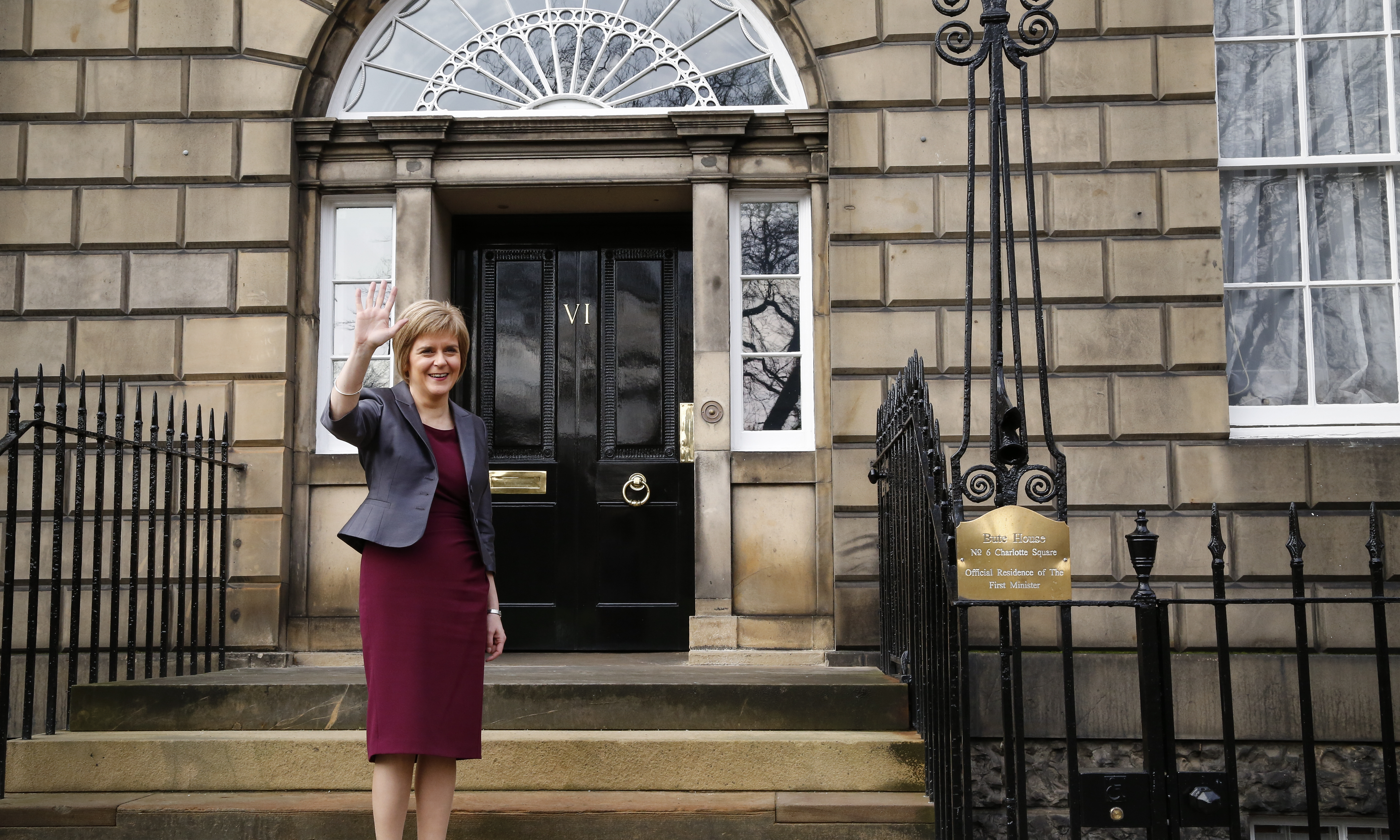
Bute House in Edinburgh is the official residence of the first minister.

The head of the Scottish Government is the first minister who also serves as the keeper of the Great Seal whilst in office as first minister. The first minister chairs the Scottish Cabinet and is primarily responsible for the formulation, development and presentation of Scottish Government policy. Additional functions of the first minister include promoting and representing Scotland in an official capacity, at home and abroad. In their capacity as Keeper of the Great Seal of Scotland, the first minister is one of only a few individuals permitted to fly the Royal Banner of the Royal Arms of Scotland.

The first minister is nominated by the Scottish Parliament by fellow MSPs, and is formally appointed by the monarch. The first minister appoints members of the Scottish Cabinet and junior ministers of the Scottish Government. As head of the Scottish Government, the first minister is directly accountable to the Scottish Parliament for their actions and the actions of the wider government and cabinet.

The office is held by John Swinney of the Scottish National Party since 7 May 2024.

=== Deputy First Minister ===
The deputy first minister supports the first minister. When the first minister is absent, such as during overseas visits and international engagements, the deputy first minister acts in his or her place. The deputy first minister may also take questions in parliament on the first minister's behalf. Whilst serving as deputy first minister, the office holder holds another cabinet position. Currently, Jenny Gilruth, the Cabinet Secretary for Finance and Local Government, serves as the deputy first minister, having taken over following the 2026 Scottish Parliament election and her predecessor's retirement.

=== Cabinet ===
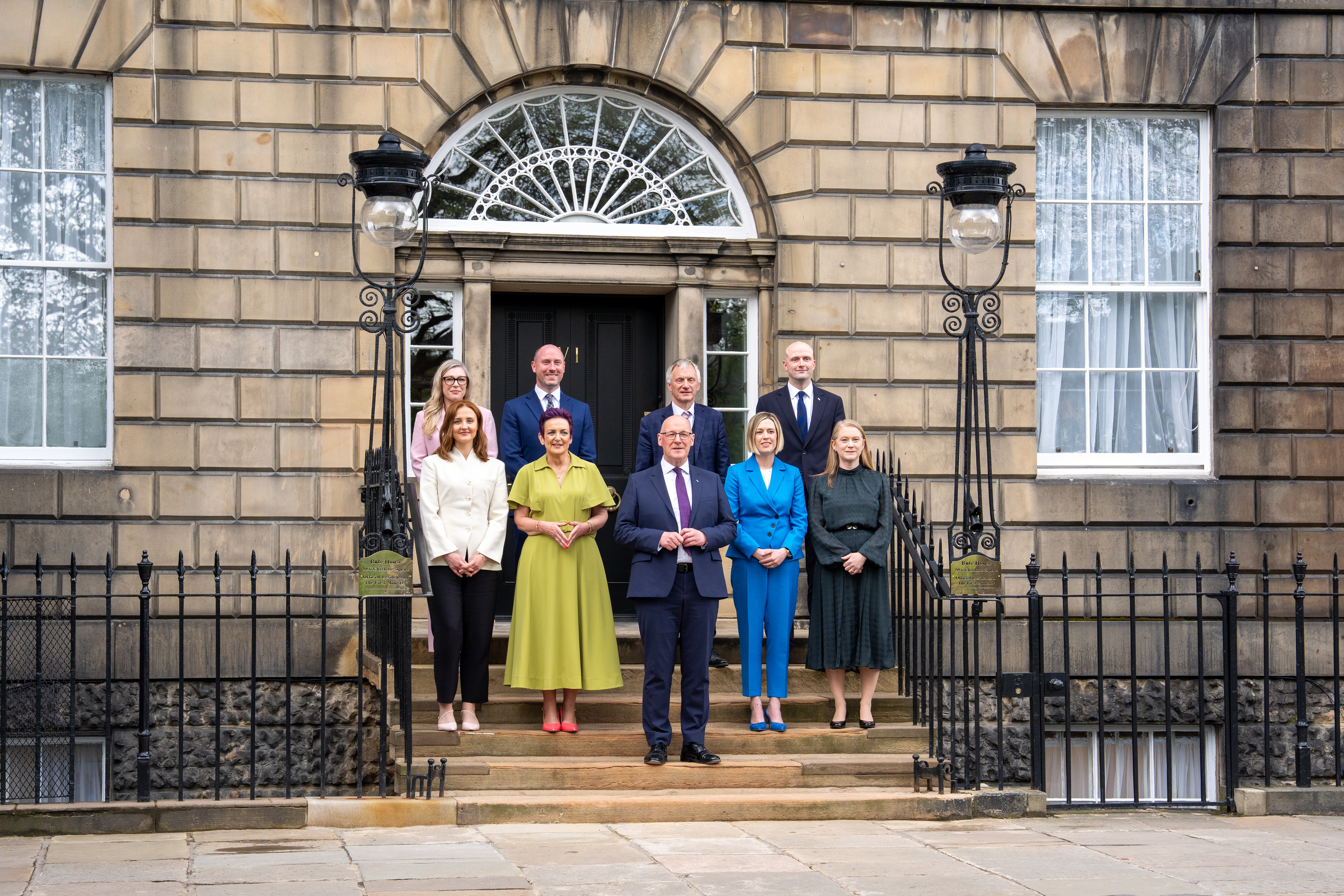
The incumbent Scottish Government; May 2026–present

The Scottish Cabinet collectively takes responsibility for policy coordination within the Scottish Government. It is supported by the Cabinet Secretariat, based at St Andrew's House. While the Scottish Parliament is in session, Cabinet meets weekly. Normally meetings are held on Tuesday afternoons in Bute House, the official residence of the First Minister. Members of the Scottish Cabinet receive blue despatch boxes for their use while in office.

There are currently two sub-committees of the Scottish Cabinet – the Cabinet Sub-Committee on Legislation, and the Scottish Government Resilience Room (SGoRR) Cabinet Sub-Committee.

=== Law officers ===
The Scottish law officers are the Lord Advocate and the Solicitor General for Scotland, and are appointed by the monarch on the recommendation of the incumbent first minister, with the agreement of the Scottish Parliament. They need not be members of the Scottish Parliament. The Lord Advocate is the principal legal adviser for both the Scottish Government and the Crown in Scotland on civil and criminal matters that fall within the devolved powers of the Scottish Parliament. The office of Lord Advocate is regarded as one of the Great Officers of State of Scotland, with the current Lord Advocate being Dorothy Bain KC, who was nominated by first minister Nicola Sturgeon in June 2021.

The Lord Advocate provides legal advice to the government on its responsibilities, policies, legislation and the legal implications of any proposals brought forward by the government. The Lord Advocate is responsible for all legal advice which is given to the Scottish Government. Additionally, they serve as the ministerial head of the Crown Office and Procurator Fiscal Service, and as such, is the chief public prosecutor for Scotland with all prosecutions on indictment being conducted by the Crown Office and Procurator Fiscal Service in the Lord Advocate's name on behalf of the Monarch. The Lord Advocate serves as the head of the systems of prosecutions in Scotland and is responsible for the investigation of all sudden, suspicious, accidental and unexplained deaths which occur within Scotland.

The Solicitor General for Scotland is one of the Law Officers of the Crown, and the deputy of the Lord Advocate, whose duty is to advise the Scottish Government on Scots law. They are also responsible for the Crown Office and Procurator Fiscal Service which together constitute the Criminal Prosecution Service in Scotland. Together with the Lord Advocate, the Solicitor General for Scotland is one of the senior legal advisors to the government in Scotland. Whilst the Solicitor General for Scotland supports the Lord Advocate in their functions, the Solicitor General may also exercise their statutory and common law powers when necessary. The incumbent Solicitor General for Scotland is Ruth Charteris KC.

=== Civil service ===
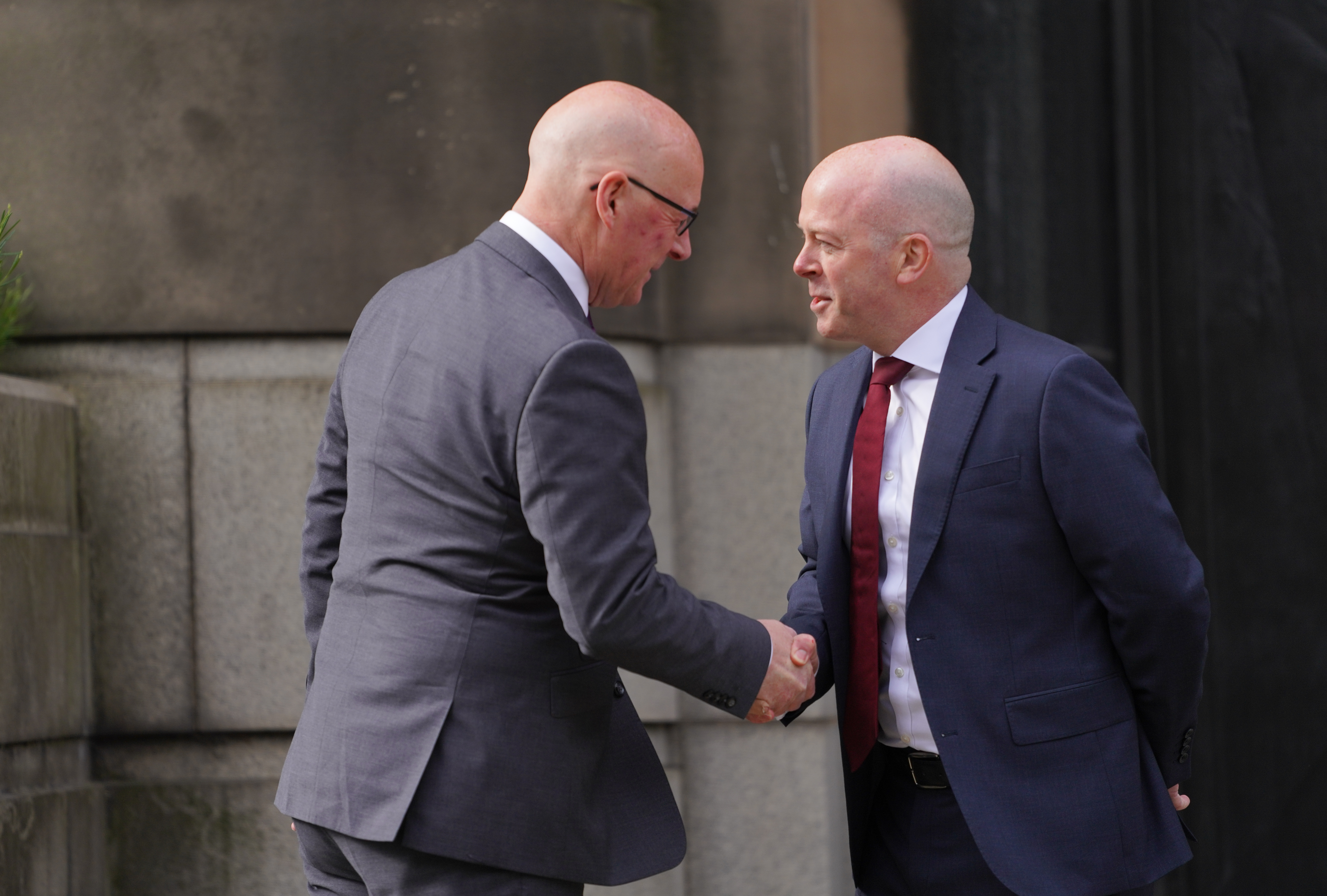
First Minister John Swinney meets with Joe Griffin, the Permanent Secretary since 2025. The permanent secretary is the most senior civil servant in Scotland

The Permanent Secretary to the Scottish Government is the most senior civil servant within the Scottish Government. They lead the administration's strategic board as well as directly support the first minister and cabinet and is the accountable officer with responsibility to ensure that the government's money and resources are used effectively and properly. The current permanent secretary is Joe Griffin, who succeeded John-Paul Marks in April 2025. The Permanent Secretary is a member of the UK Civil Service, and therefore takes part in the UK-wide Permanent Secretaries Management Group under the Cabinet Secretary who performs a number of similar functions in relation to the UK Government. The Scottish Government's Permanent Secretary is responsible to the Scottish Ministers in terms of policy.

In addition to the Scottish Ministers, the Scottish Government is supported by a number of officials drawn from the UK Civil Service. They are collectively referred to as the Scottish Administration in the Scotland Act 1998. According to 2012 reports, there are 16,000 civil servants working in core Scottish Government directorates and agencies. A total of eight director–generals head Scotland's civil service department. Each director–general is responsible for a number of directorates and agencies of the Scottish Government and are directly accountable for the legislation proposals, as well as implementing government policy into practice. Public bodies (non–ministerial departments of the Scottish Government) are the responsibility of the senior civil servants as opposed to Scottish Government ministers.

The civil service is a matter reserved to the British parliament at Westminster (rather than devolved to Holyrood): Scottish Government civil servants work within the rules and customs of His Majesty's Civil Service, but serve the Scottish Government rather than British government. The strategic board is composed of the permanent secretary, the seven directors-general, two chief advisers (scientific and economic) and four non-executive directors. The board is responsible for providing support to the government through the permanent secretary, and is the executive of the Scottish civil service.

=== Directorates, Agencies and Bodies ===
The Scottish Government is divided into 51 directorates which execute government policy in specified areas. Unlike in the British government, senior ministers do not lead government departments and have no direct role in the operation of the directorates. The directorates are grouped together into "Directorates General", each run by a senior civil servant who is titled a "Director-General". As of October 2026, there are seven Directorates General, and supporting these directorates are a variety of other corporate service teams and professional groups. The Crown Office and Procurator Fiscal Service serves as an independent prosecution service in Scotland, and is a ministerial department of the Scottish Government. It is headed by the Lord Advocate, who is, along with the procurators fiscal, responsible for prosecution under Scots law.

To deliver its work, there are 1a executive agencies established by ministers as part of government departments, or as departments in their own right, to carry out a discrete area of work. These include, for example, the Scottish Prison Service and Transport Scotland. Executive agencies are staffed by civil servants. The Scottish Government is also responsible for a large number of non-departmental public bodies (NDPBs). These include executive NDPBs (e.g. Scottish Enterprise); advisory NDPBs (e.g. the Scottish Law Commission); tribunals (e.g. the Children's Panel and Additional Support Needs Tribunals for Scotland); and nationalised industries (e.g. Scottish Water). These are staffed by public servants, rather than civil servants. The Scottish Government is also responsible for some other public bodies that are not classed as non-departmental public bodies, such as NHS Boards, visiting committees for Scottish penal establishments, and HM Chief Inspector of Constabulary for Scotland.

Additionally, there are non-ministerial offices, which are staffed by civil servants and form part of the devolved Scottish administration, but answer directly to the Scottish Parliament rather than to ministers. Examples include the Office of the Scottish Charity Regulator, and Environmental Standards Scotland.

== Budget ==
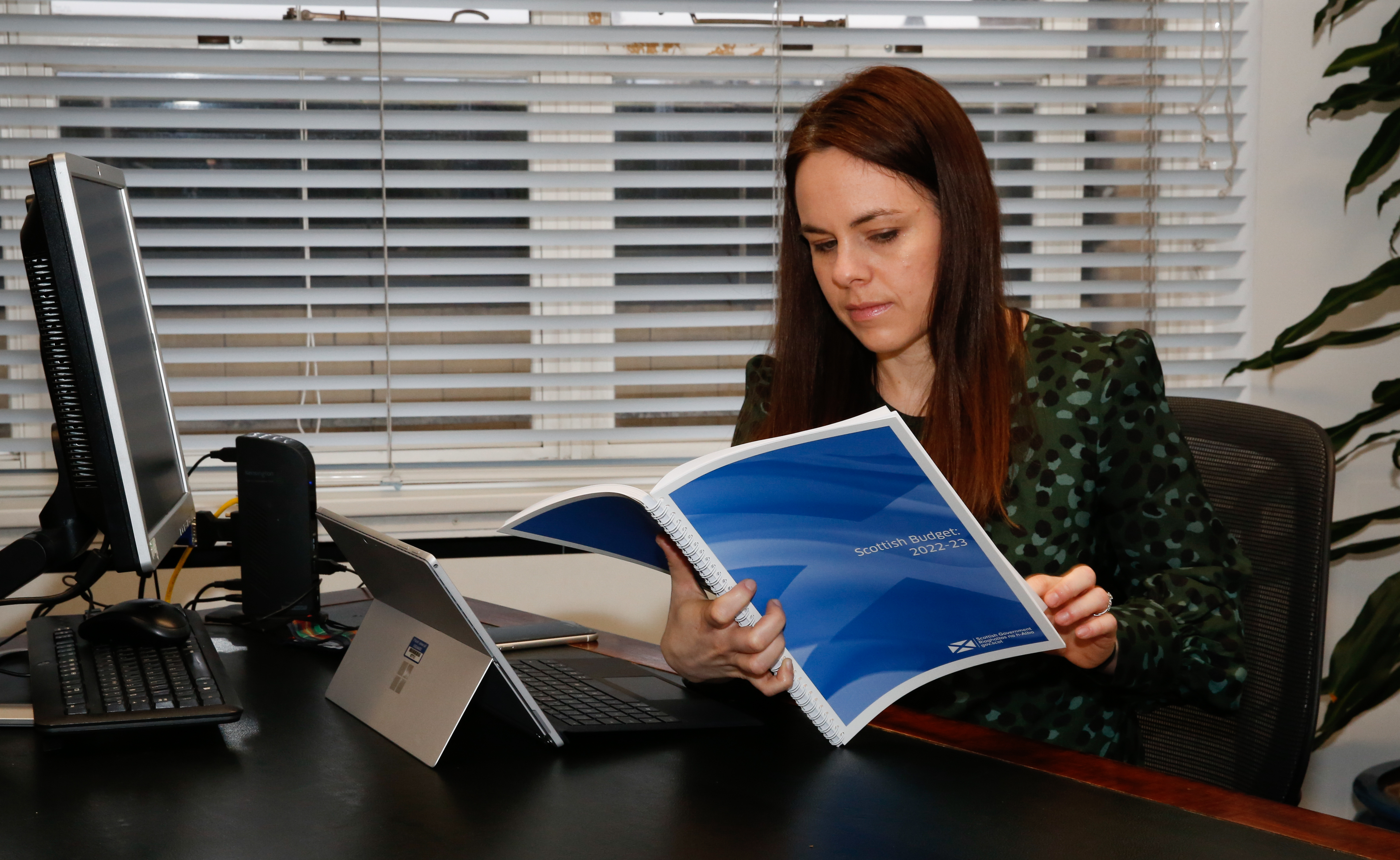
Finance Secretary Kate Forbes prepares the 2022–2023 Scottish budget.

The Scottish Government outlines all spending and tax plans in its annual Scottish budget. In Scotland, the fiscal year runs from 1 April until 30 March, with the budget being presented to the Scottish Parliament by the government usually in November. The accompanying Budget Document is featured with the Budget Bill, which sets out the plans in a legal document. Initially, the Budget Bill is first debated by Scottish Parliament MSPs who conduct votes within the Scottish Parliament on any amendments to the bill before voting on the bill to be made into law. Once passed by parliament and given royal assent by the monarch, the Scottish Government thus becomes legally responsible for implementing the expenditure and taxation plans which were detailed within the budget for the coming fiscal year.

The Budget outlines all plans for how the Scottish Government intends to distribute funds to each government department. The government must provide their reasonings for the allocation of funding, and may also decide on changes in tax rates and bands, changes to welfare benefits. The government also proposes any new taxes, additional welfare benefits and public services in the budget. During the 2019-2020 financial year, approximately 58% of total spending in Scotland was spent by both the Scottish Government and local government, in contrast to 41% of funding spent in Scotland by UK government bodies. The tax powers of the Scottish Government contribute towards a significant amount of the funding within the Scottish budget. For 2024-2025 the Scottish net fiscal balance was −11.6% of GDP.

=== Government spending and funding ===
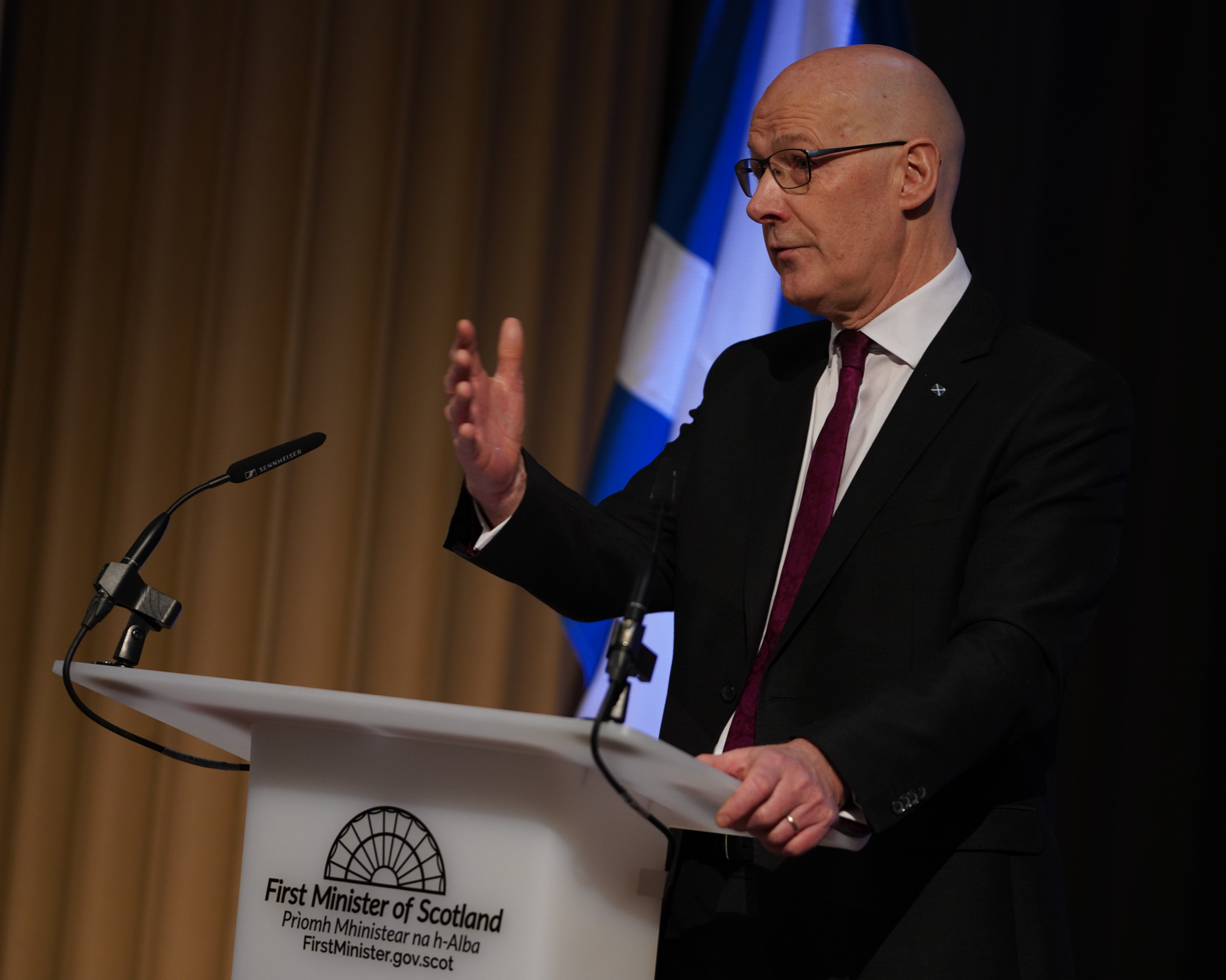
First Minister John Swinney makes a speech regarding the 2025 Scottish Budget, Edinburgh, January 2025

The Scottish Government primarily spends in three main categories – Capital, Resource and Annually Managed Expenditure (AME). AME directly contributes £9 billion to the Scottish budget, and includes all levels of funding that are devolved, however, it also continues to be annually funded by the UK Government on the basis of demand. The areas of budget responsibility in which the Scottish Government has most influence over is resource and capital spending. The resource budget is associated primarily with all day-to-day spending required to provide Scottish public services, whilst the capital budget is primarily for any investment in assets and infrastructure around the country.

AME spending is usually required to be spent on areas such as NHS employees and teacher pensions, with that funding being ringfenced, meaning that the Scottish Government has very little influence over spending within AME. The Scottish Government's budget is primarily made up of funding from block grants determined by the Barnett Formula, from devolved taxes and non-tax income, block grant adjustments, reconciliation payments as well as government borrowing. The Cabinet Secretary for Finance and Local Government is the minister of the Scottish Government responsible for outlining government spending plans in the annual budget.

== Elections and voting ==
Unlike some other countries, Scotland and the Scottish Parliament do not elect one individual to become the first minister, nor does it directly elect members of the government. Rather, the electorate in Scotland votes in parliamentary elections for the Scottish Parliament by voting for one constituency MSP and one regional MSP. In turn, the party with the largest candidates returned to the Scottish Parliament will be asked by the monarch to form a Scottish Government in their name. From 1999 until 2007, the Scottish Government, then known as the Scottish Executive, was headed by a coalition agreement between the Scottish Labour Party and Scottish Liberal Democrats. Since 2007, the Scottish Government has been run by the Scottish National Party, forming a majority government for the first time in the history of the Scottish Government following the 2011 Scottish Parliament elections. In 2007, Alex Salmond became the first politician from the SNP to lead the Scottish Government.

In 2024, the Scottish Parliament passed the Scottish Elections (Representation and Reform) Bill which the government claims will "enhance Scotland's democratic processes". One of the major introductions of the bill is the ban on MSPs also serving as an MP or Peer in the UK Parliament whilst serving as an incumbent MSP in the Scottish Parliament. The Scottish Government is directly responsible for all elections to the Scottish Parliament and local government in Scotland. The Scottish Elections (Reduction of Voting Age) Act 2015 allows all 16 and 17-year olds in Scotland to vote, the first election in which they were eligible to vote being the 2016 Scottish Parliament election.

== Local government ==
Local government in Scotland consists of 32 local authorities which operate independently from the central, devolved Scottish Government. The local authorities, known as councils, provides public services which include education, social care, waste management, libraries and planning in their respective areas. Councils receive their funding from the Scottish Government over a three-year period, however, at times this may be reduced to every one year.

The Cabinet Secretary for Finance and Local Government is the minister within the Scottish Government responsible for relations between the central Scottish Government and local government across Scotland.

== Responsibilities ==
The responsibilities of the Scottish Ministers broadly follow those of the Scottish Parliament provided for in the Scotland Act 1998 and subsequent UK legislation. Where pre-devolution legislation of the UK Parliament provided that certain functions could be performed by UK Government ministers, these functions were transferred to the Scottish Ministers if they were within the legislative competence of the Scottish Parliament. The Scottish Government's main areas for responsibility in the country include education, health and social care, Scots law, policing and justice, emergency services including the fire and ambulance services, local government, taxation, housing, rural affairs, home affairs, tourism, sport, culture, parliamentary elections to the Scottish Parliament and local government, the crown estate, some social security powers and rail franchising, amongst a considerable amount of others.

The 1998 Act also provided for orders to be made allowing Scottish Ministers to exercise powers of UK Government ministers in areas that remain reserved to the Parliament of the United Kingdom. Equally the Act allows for the Scottish Ministers to transfer functions to the UK Government ministers, or for particular "agency arrangements". This executive devolution means that the powers of the Scottish Ministers and the Scottish Parliament are not identical.

The members of the Scottish government have substantial influence over legislation in Scotland, putting forward the majority of bills that are successful in becoming Acts of the Scottish Parliament.

=== Under Scotland Act 1998 ===
Functions which were devolved under the Scotland Act 1998 included:

- Healthcare – NHS Scotland, mental health, dentistry, social care
- Education – pre-school, primary, secondary, further, higher and lifelong education, as well as educational training policy and programmes
- Student Awards Agency for Scotland
- Scottish Public Pensions Agency
- Scots law and justice – civil justice, civil law and procedure, courts, criminal justice, criminal law and procedure, debt and bankruptcy, family law, legal aid, the legal profession, property law and Disclosure Scotland
- Most aspects of transport – setting drink and drug-driving limits, speed limits, some aspects of railways, including Scottish passenger rail franchises (ScotRail), concessionary travel schemes, cycling, parking, local road pricing, congestion charging, promotion of road safety and road signs
- Environment – environmental protection policy, climate change, pollution, waste management, water supplies and sewerage, national parks and flood and coastal protection
- Policing and the Scottish Prison Service
- Planning system in Scotland
- Rural Affairs (including Scotland's Environmental and Rural Services – Cairngorms National Park Authority, Crofting Commission, Scottish Forestry, Forestry and Land Scotland, Scottish Environment Protection Agency, NatureScot and Deer Commission for Scotland)
- Housing – housing policy, Scottish Housing Regulator, affordable homes, homelessness and homelessness legislation, child poverty, security of tenure, energy efficiency, homeownership, short assured tenancy, rented housing and rent control, Town Centre First, social rents, private sector housing security, Tenancy deposit schemes, Scottish Social Housing Charter and the Scottish Housing Quality Standard
- Accountant in Bankruptcy
- Agriculture, forestry and fisheries – most aspects of animal welfare, but not including animal testing and research
- Sport and the arts – Creative Scotland, the National Gallery of Scotland, library and museum collections, the National Museum of Scotland, national performing companies and SportScotland, the national agency for sport
- Consumer advocacy and advice
- Tourism – VisitScotland and promotion of major events in Scotland
- Economic development
- Freedom of Information (FOI) requests

=== Under Scotland Acts 2012 and 2016 ===
Subsequently, the Scotland Acts of 2012 and 2016 transferred powers over:

- Some taxation powers – full control of Income Tax on income earned through employment, Land and Buildings Transaction Tax, Landfill Tax, Aggregates Levy, Air Departure Tax, Revenue Scotland
- Drink driving limits
- Air weapons
- Additional borrowing powers, up to the sum of £5 billion
- Transport police in Scotland
- Road signs, speed limits and abortion rights in Scotland
- Powers over Income Tax rates and bands on non-savings and non-dividend income
- Scottish Parliament and local authority elections
- Some social security powers, notably 18 devolved benefits administered by Social Security Scotland
- Crown Estate of Scotland – management of the Crown Estate's economic assets in Scotland
- Extended powers over Employment Support and the housing aspect of Universal Credit
- Some aspects of the energy network in Scotland – renewable energy, energy efficiency and onshore oil and gas licensing
- The right to receive half of the VAT raised in Scotland.
- Some aspects of equality legislation in Scotland
- Gaming machine licensing

The 1998 Act also provided for orders to be made allowing Scottish Ministers to exercise powers of UK Government ministers in areas that remain reserved to the Parliament of the United Kingdom. Equally the Act allows for the Scottish Ministers to transfer functions to the UK Government ministers, or for particular "agency arrangements". This executive devolution means that the powers of the Scottish Ministers and the Scottish Parliament are not identical.

The members of the Scottish government have substantial influence over legislation in Scotland, putting forward the majority of bills that are successful in becoming Acts of the Scottish Parliament.

== Offices ==
St Andrew's House is the headquarters of the Scottish Government; it is located at Calton Hill in Edinburgh. Some other government directorates are based at the Victoria Quay and Saughton House in Edinburgh, and Atlantic Quay in Glasgow. The head offices of the Crown Office and Procurator Fiscal Service and the Lord Advocate's Chambers are at Chambers Street in central Edinburgh.

The Scottish Government owns numerous other Edinburgh properties. Both the Scottish Fiscal Commission and the Scottish Human Rights Commission are based in the old Governor's House on the site of the former Calton Gaol, adjacent to St Andrew's House on Regent Road. Other offices are scattered around central Edinburgh, including Bute House in Charlotte Square, the official residence of the first minister.

All ministers and officials have access to Scotland House at Victoria Embankment in London, when necessary. Dover House on Whitehall is now used by the Scotland Office and the devolved Scottish Ministers no longer use it.

The Scottish Government also operates local offices and specialist facilities around Scotland, for example those used by Rural Payments & Services and Marine Scotland.

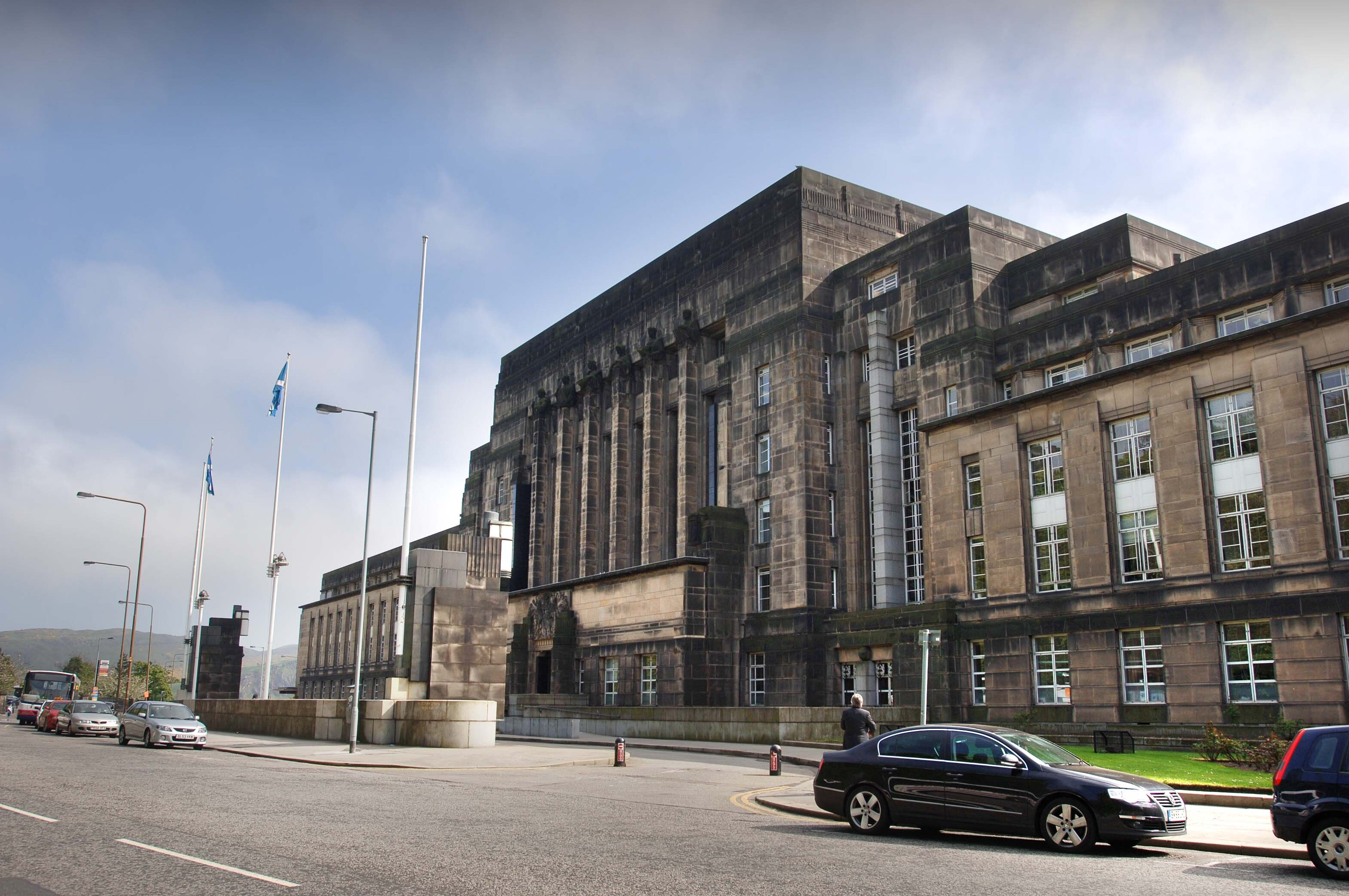
St Andrew's House, headquarters of the Scottish Government

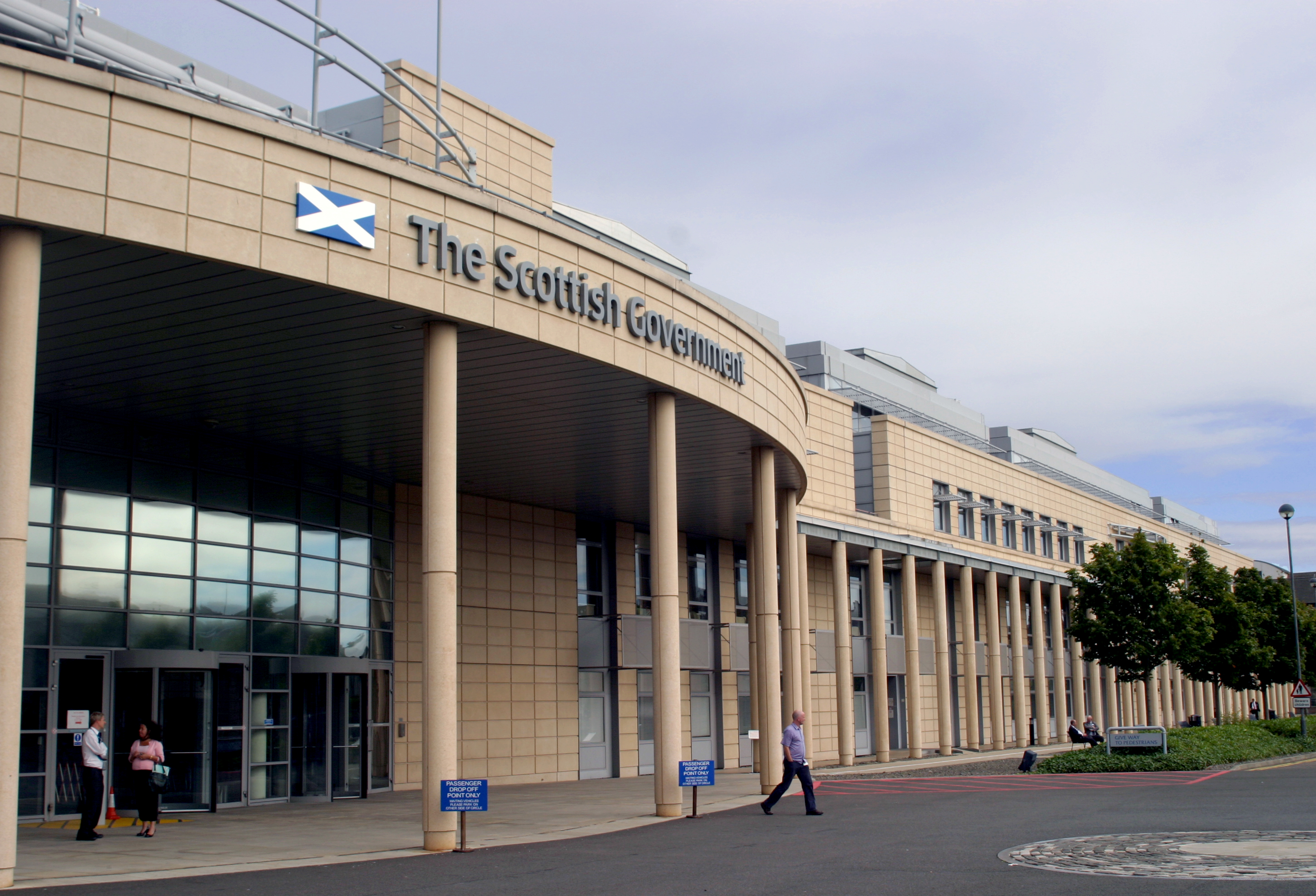
Victoria Quay, offices of the Scottish Government

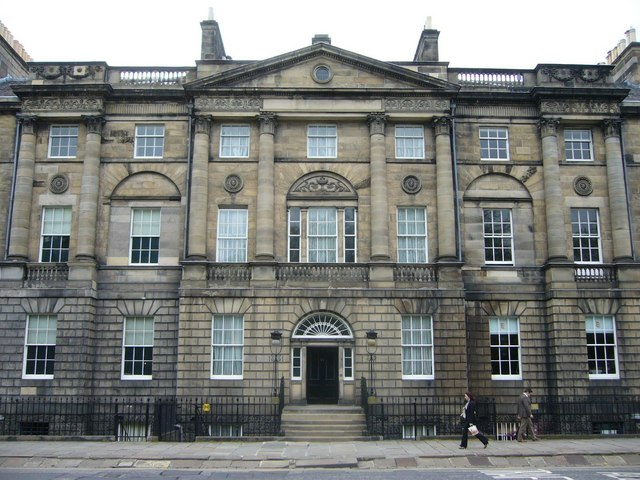
Bute House, the official residence of the First Minister

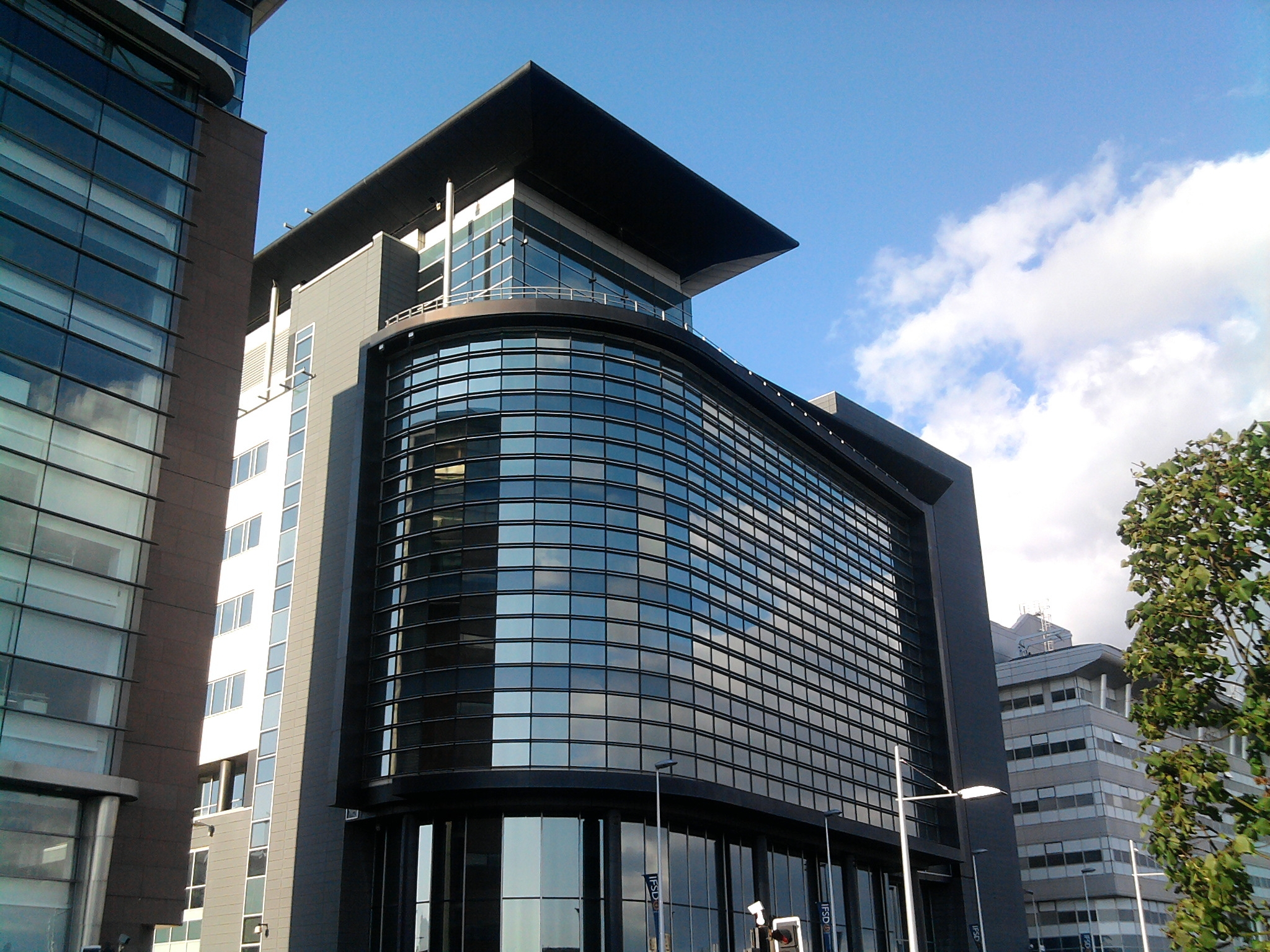
Scottish Government offices at 5 Atlantic Quay in Glasgow

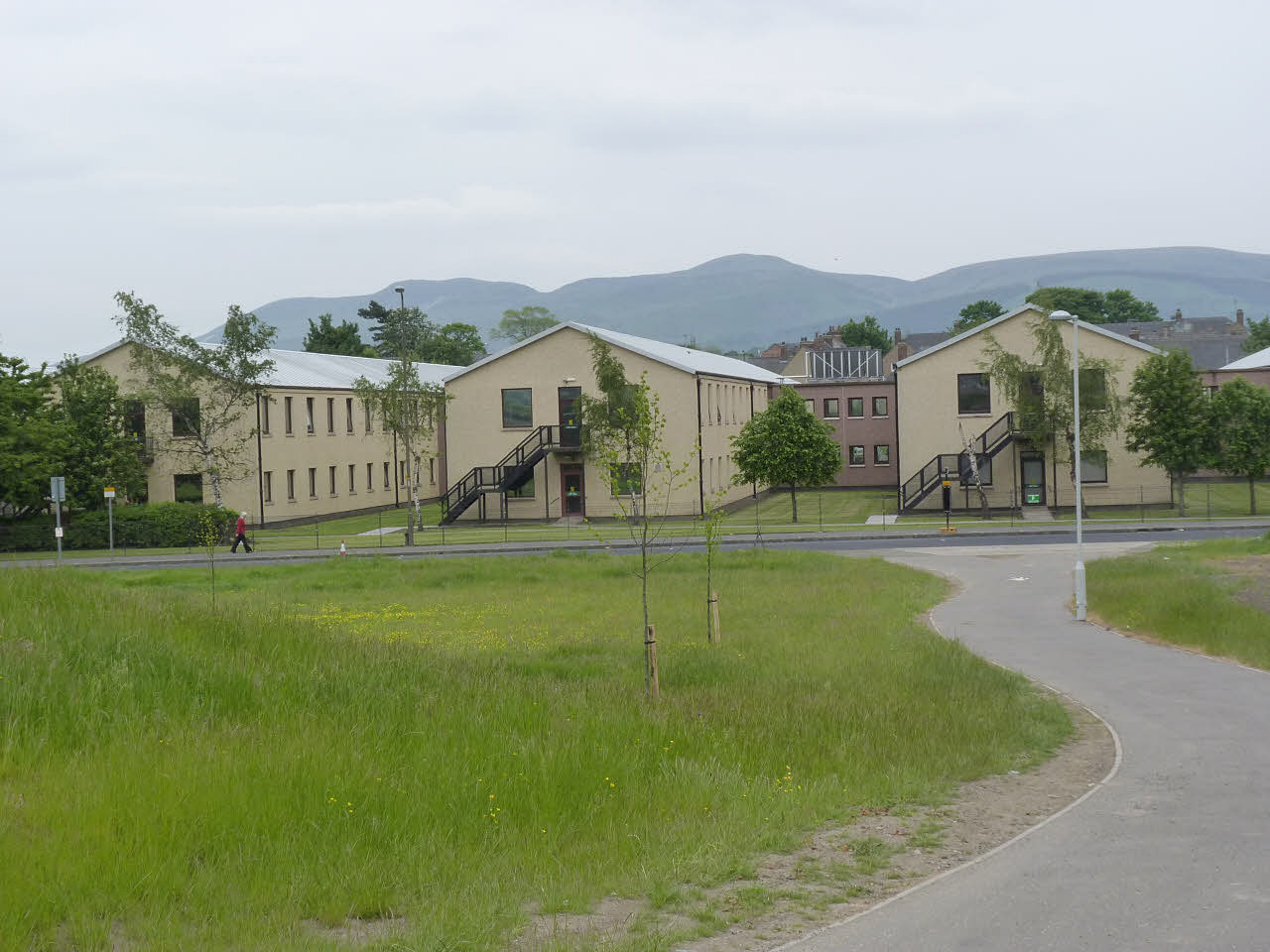
Government offices at Saughton House in Edinburgh

== International network ==
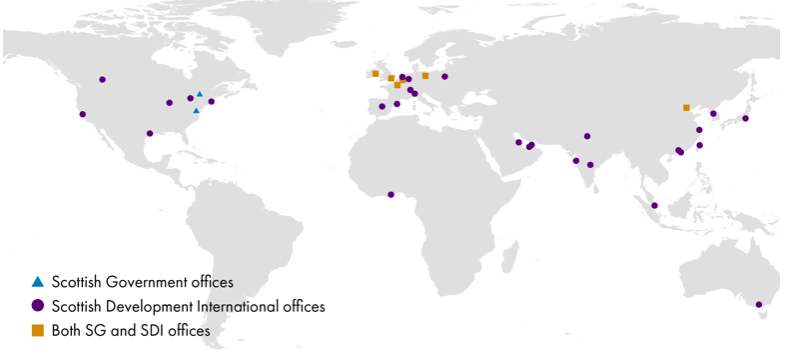
Network of Scottish Government offices worldwide

The Scottish Government has a European Union representative office, located at Rond-Point Robert Schuman in Brussels, Belgium, which forms a part of the United Kingdom Permanent Representation to the European Union. The Scottish Government also maintains offices within the British Embassy in Washington, D.C., as well as the British Embassy in Berlin and has accredited representatives within the British Embassy in Beijing.

Scotland has a network of eight international offices across the world located in:

- Beijing (Scottish Government Beijing Office, British Embassy)
- Berlin (Scottish Government Berlin Office)
- Brussels (Scotland House Brussels)
- Copenhagen (Scottish Government Copenhagen Office)
- Dublin (Scottish Government Dublin Office, British Embassy)
- Ottawa (Scottish Government Ottawa Office, British High Commission)
- Paris (Scottish Government Office, British Embassy)
- Washington DC (Scottish Government Washington DC Office, British Embassy)

== See also ==
- Ministerial committee
- Local income tax in Scotland
- Council of Economic Advisers (Scotland)
- Scottish Broadcasting Commission
- Scottish Social Attitudes Survey
- 2014 Scottish independence referendum
  - Edinburgh Agreement
- Kingdom of Scotland
  - Politics of Scotland
  - Parliament of Scotland
  - Parliament House, Edinburgh
- Union of the Crowns
- Treaty of Union
- Scottish devolution
