= Victoria Quay =

Victoria Quay may refer to:

- Victoria Quay, Edinburgh, Scottish Government building in Leith, Edinburgh
- Victoria Quay, Fremantle, south side dock area of Fremantle harbour, in Fremantle, Western Australia
- Victoria Quay, one of the Dublin quays, Ireland

== See also ==
- Victoria Harbour (disambiguation)
- Victoria Quays, Sheffield; canal terminus in Sheffield
