= Oil industry in Scotland =

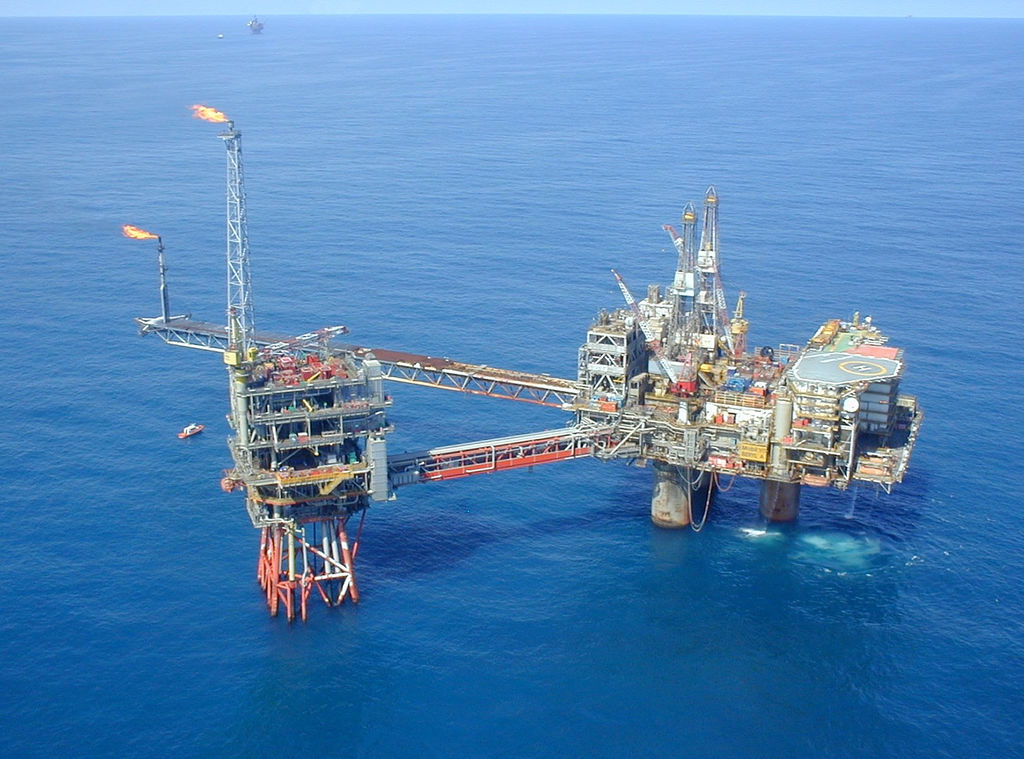
The Beryl Alpha oil rig off the coast of Aberdeen

The oil industry in Scotland was largely created upon the discovery of North Sea oil. The country is one of the world’s leading oil producers, and in 2020, oil and gas contributed £13.8 billion to the Scottish economy and supported 100,000 jobs. Commercial extraction of oil on the shores of the North Sea dates back to 1851, when James Young retorted oil from torbanite (boghead coal, or oil shale) mined in the Midland Valley of Scotland.

Scottish waters consisting of a large sector of the North Atlantic and the North Sea, containing the largest oil resources in Western Europe. Scotland is one of Europe's largest petroleum producers, with the discovery of North Sea oil transforming the Scottish economy. Oil was discovered in the North Sea in 1966, with the first year of full production taking place in 1976.

With the growth of oil exploration during that time, as well as the ancillary industries needed to support it, the city of Aberdeen became the UK's centre of the North Sea Oil Industry, with the port and harbour serving many oil fields off shore. Sullom Voe in Shetland is the site of a major oil terminal, where oil is piped in and transferred to tankers. Similarly the Flotta Oil Terminal in Orkney is linked by a 230 km long pipeline to the Piper and Occidental oil fields in the North Sea. Grangemouth is at the centre of Scotland's petrochemicals industry. The oil related industries are a major source of employment and income in these regions.

== History ==
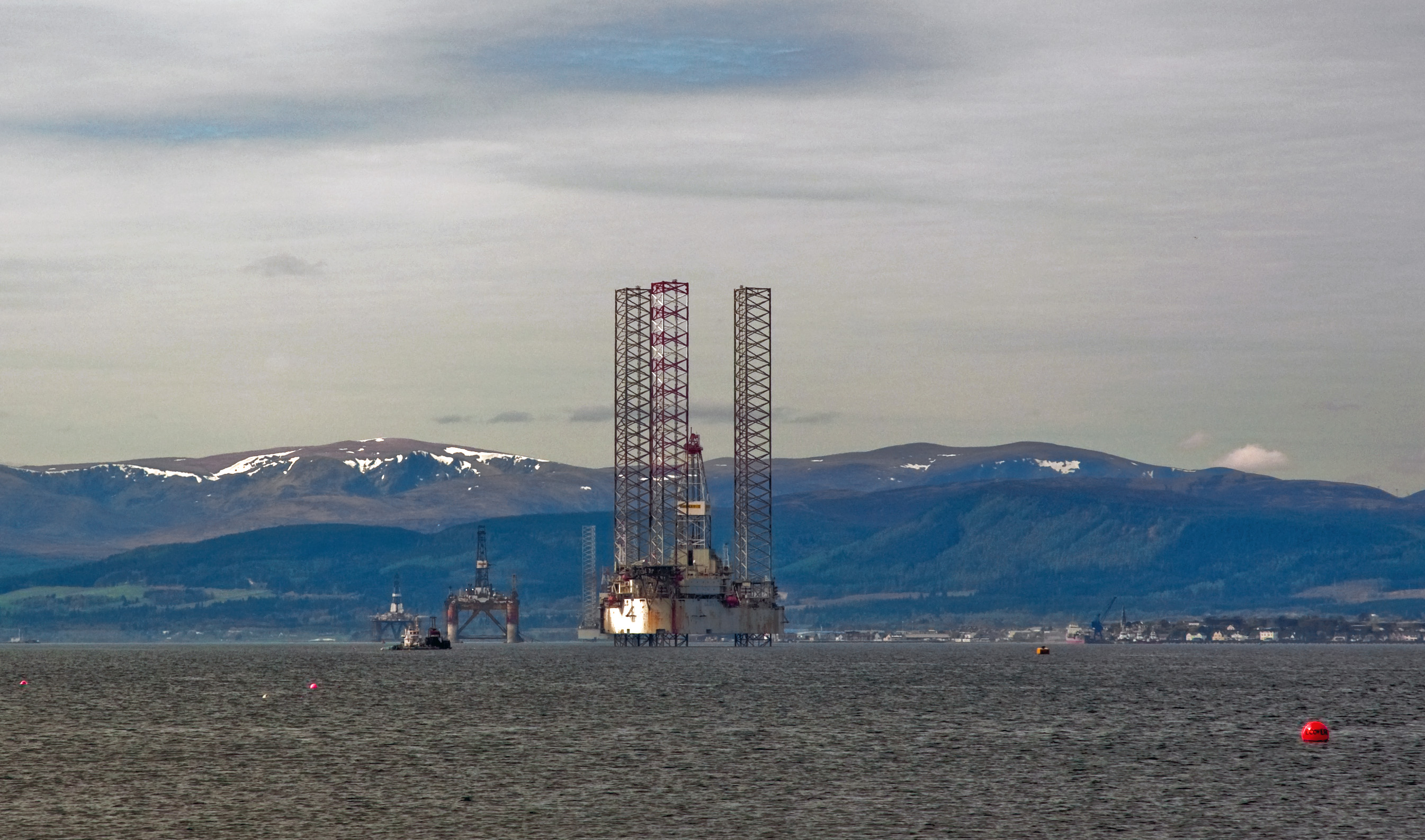
Oil rigs at Cromarty Firth, Scotland

In December 1969, Amoco discovered the Montrose Field about 217 km (135 mi) east of Aberdeen. The original objective of the well had been to drill for gas to test the idea that the southern North Sea gas province extended to the north. Amoco were astonished when the well discovered oil. BP had been awarded several licences in the area in the second licensing round late in 1965, but had been reluctant to work on them.

=== North Sea oil ===
Oil and gas activity in Scotland mostly takes place offshore on offshore oil and gas platforms, many of which are located 12 miles off the coast of Aberdeen.

==== Economic benefits ====
The extraction of oil and gas in Scottish waters was estimated to have contributed £25.2 billion in Gross Value Added (GVA) to the Economy of Scotland in 2022, representing 11.8% of the overall Scottish Gross Domestic Product (GDP) figure. In March 2023, the Scottish Government established the Energy System and Just Transition Independent Analysis Report, which found that the oil and gas industry in Scotland generated £16 billion in GVA in 2019 whilst it supported the employment of 57,000 people.

==== Scottish Government ====
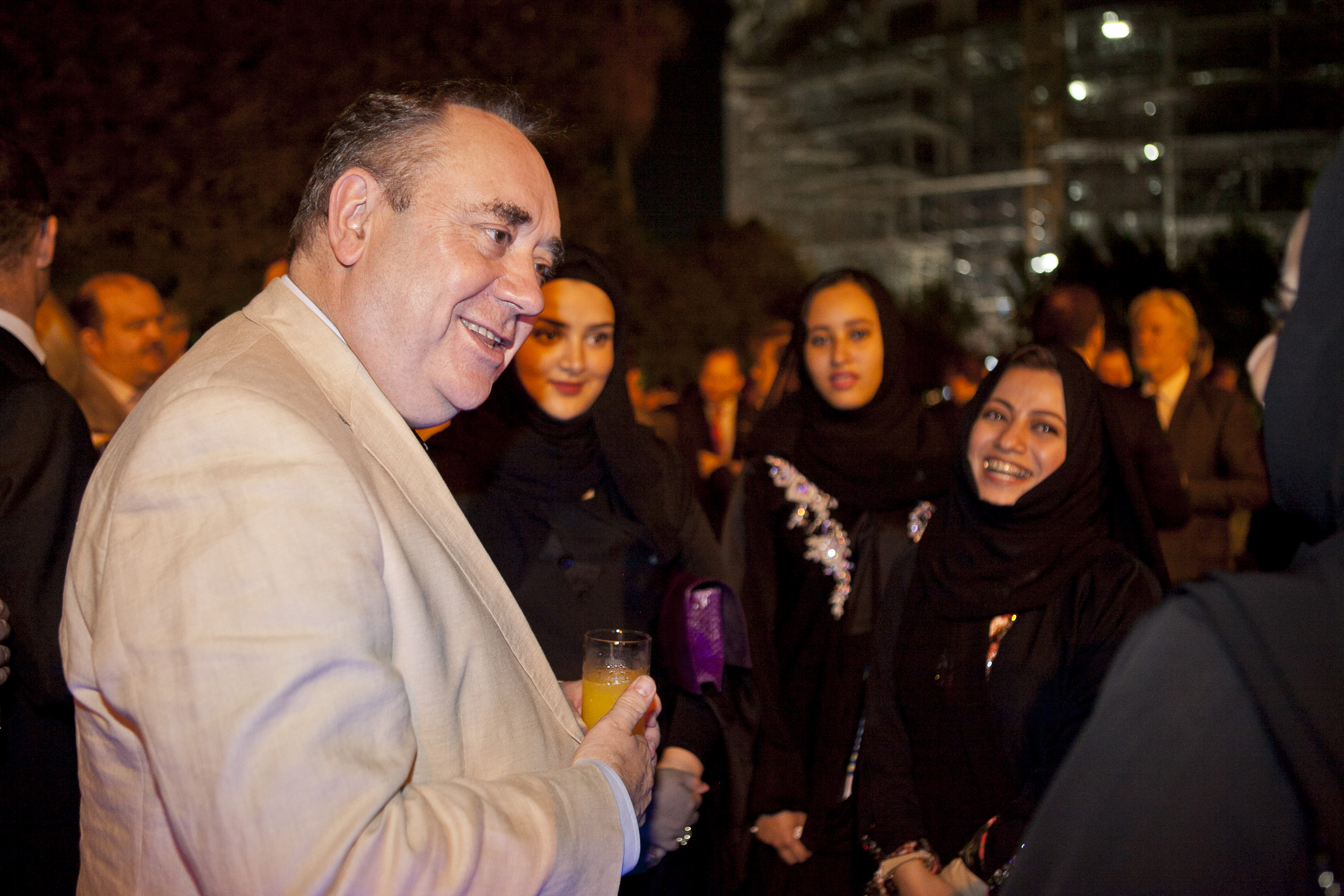
First Minister Alex Salmond attends a reception for oil and gas companies, Abu Dhabi, 2011

Whilst the Scottish Government acknowledges the economic and social advantage that the discovery and extraction of oil and gas in the North Sea has on Scotland, it has also established ambitious transition targets to Net Zero emissions and have confirmed that "any further extraction and use of fossil fuels must be consistent with Scotland’s climate obligations and Just Transition commitments". The licensing for offshore oil and gas extraction is reserved to the UK Government, whilst the listening for onshore oil and gas extraction has been devolved to the Scottish Government. On matters relating to offshore oil and gas extraction and listening in the North Sea, the Scottish Government has called on the UK Government to establish a "four nations approach" in order to "agree a robust and transparent approach to climate compatibility checkpoints for oil and gas licensing".

Powers for the Scottish Government and Scottish Parliament to legislate on onshore oil and gas extraction was devolved on 9 February 2018. Sections 47–49 of the Scotland Act 2016 transferred powers to "legislate for the granting and regulation of onshore licences, determine the terms and conditions of licences and regulate the licensing process, including administration of existing onshore licences". All onshore oil and gas licences currently held in Scotland are set out in legislation.

== Future ==
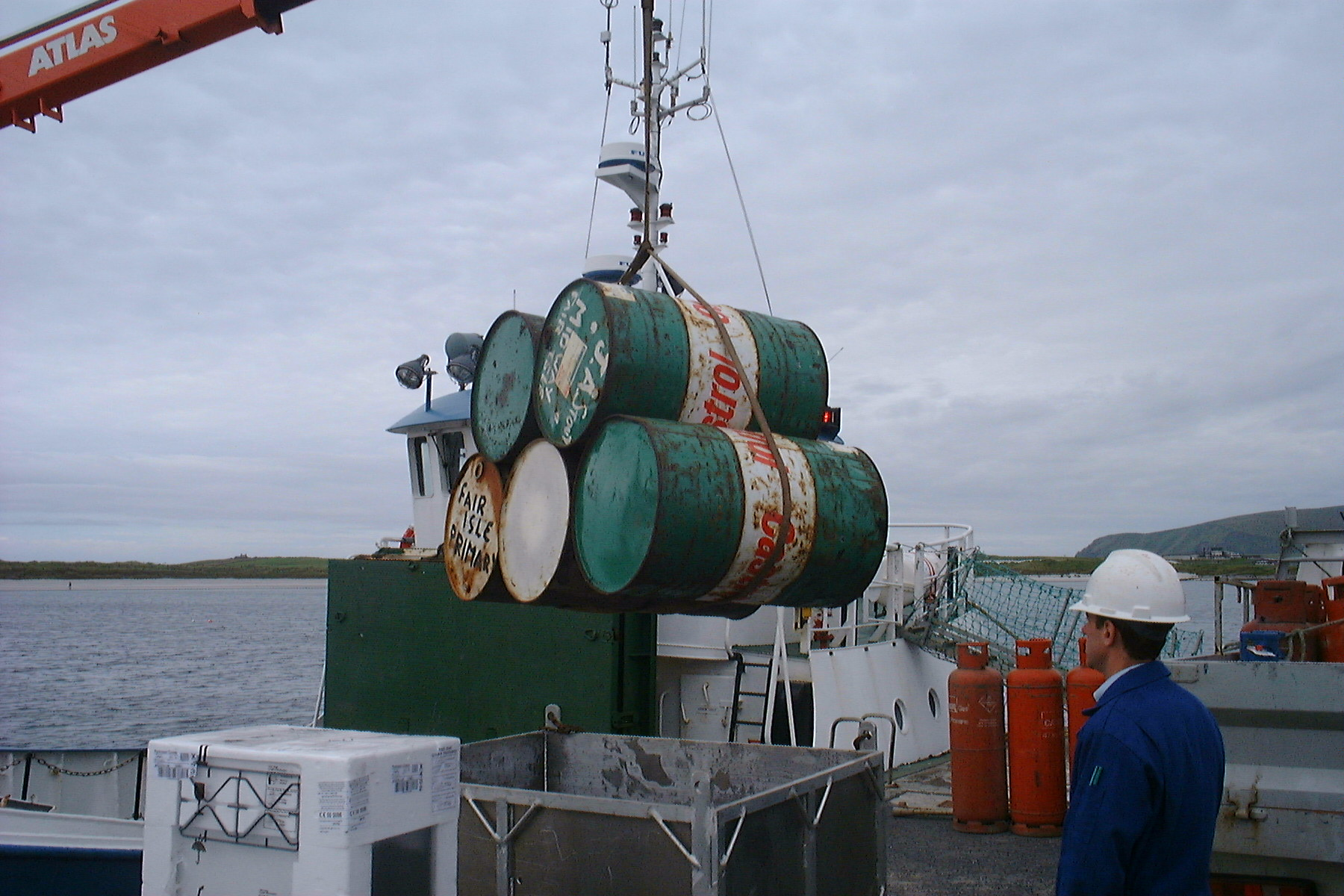
Oil drums being loaded at Grutness Harbour, Shetland Isles

=== Decline ===
Although North Sea oil production has been declining since 1999, an estimated 920 million tonnes of recoverable crude oil remained in 2009. Over two and a half billion tonnes were recovered from UK offshore oil fields between the first North Sea crude coming ashore in 1975 and 2002, with most oil fields being expected to remain economically viable until at least 2020. High oil prices have resulted in a resurgence of oil exploration, specifically in the North East Atlantic basin to the west of Shetland and the Outer Hebrides, in areas that were previously considered marginal and unprofitable. The North Sea oil and gas industry contributed £35 billion to the UK economy (a little under 1% of GDP) in 2014 and is expected to decline in the coming years.

The Scottish Government recognise that the North Sea "basin is mature and oil and gas production will inevitably decline". The government is committed to the transfer of workers in North Sea oil and gas fields to transition to other sectors of the industry relating to net zero energy and other adjacent energy sectors.

In the run up to the 2014 Scottish independence referendum, it was widely claimed that North Sea oil and gas extraction was fast declining, leading to uncertainty of its future and any economic benefits it would continue to generate in an independent Scotland. This view is in sharp contrast to recent developments in 2023, with the UK Government commissioning new oil and gas fields in the North Sea off the coast of the Shetland Isles.

=== Transition to net-zero energy ===
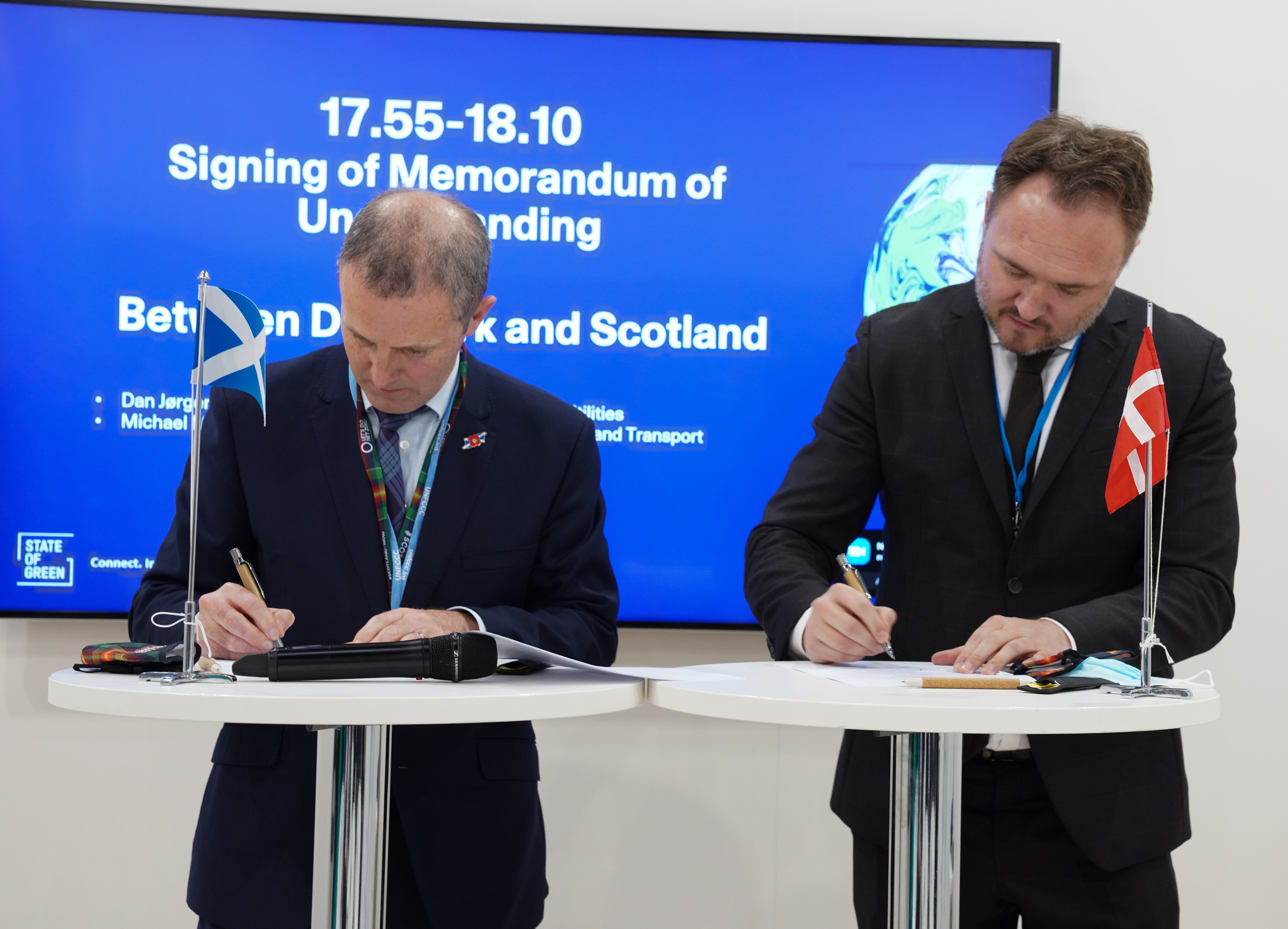
Scotland and Denmark sign an agreement towards net zero economies at the 2021 United Nations Climate Change Conference

The Scottish Government has pledged for Scotland to become a net zero energy and emissions country. Through a number of targets, the Scottish Government aim to achieve this by "commissioning and publishing independent analysis to look at the Scotland's future energy system, commissioning research and working with partners to develop carbon capture, utilisation and storage in Scotland and supporting a number of demonstration projects to develop hydrogen and hydrogen fuel cells". Additionally, the Scottish Government is committed in "supporting the transition in the North East of Scotland from oil and gas to renewables with our Energy Transition Fund, whilst supporting businesses, communities and individuals to transition to net zero and create jobs in low carbon industries through the Just Transition Fund and strategically engaging with stakeholders across the energy sector through multiple avenues, including the Scottish Energy Advisory Board (SEAB)". Furthermore, they aim to collaborate with the "North Sea Transition Deal (NSTD) through both the North Sea Transition Forum and the North Sea Transition Deal Delivery Group".

The Scottish Government has previously concluded work surrounding the policymaking process on "unconventional oil and gas development in Scotland" and have also worked to enhance the "oil and gas decommissioning capacity and capabilities through the Decommissioning Challenge Fund", which completed a total of three "successful application calls" from 2017 to 2019.

== Oil and Gas stations (onshore) ==
Name	Operator	Location (UK grid reference)	Council area	Fuel	Capacity (MW)	Commissioned	Closed
Arnish	Scottish and Southern Energy	NB422304	Western Isles	Diesel	10.3	2000	-
Barra	Scottish and Southern Energy	NF718033	Western Isles	Diesel	2.5	1986	-
Bowmore	Scottish and Southern Energy	NR320602	Argyll and Bute	Diesel	6.0	1946	-
Brodick				Diesel	3.087		
Campbeltown				Diesel	3.740		
Daliburgh				Diesel	1.56		
Grangemouth	Grangemouth CHP	NS944810	Falkirk	Gas	130	2001	-
Inverkip	South of Scotland Electricity Board	NS196711	Inverclyde	Oil	1900	1970	1988
Kirkwall	Scottish and Southern Energy	HY44651097	Orkney	Oil	16	1951	
Lerwick A and B	Scottish and Southern Energy	HU465427	Shetland	Oil	67	1953 & 1996	-
Lochalsh				Diesel	0.91		
Loch Carnan	Scottish and Southern Energy	NF832427	Western Isles	Diesel	11.8	1971	-
Peterhead	Scottish and Southern Energy	NK127430	Aberdeenshire	Gas	1550	1980	-
Stornoway	Scottish and Southern Energy	NB431321	Western Isles	Diesel	23.5	1950	-
Sullom Voe Terminal	ENGIE	HU401751	Shetland	Gas	22 (100)	1980	-
Tiree	Scottish and Southern Energy	NL997446	Argyll and Bute	Diesel	2.5	1953	-
Tobermory				Diesel	1.375		

== See also ==
- Energy in Scotland
- 1979 Scottish devolution referendum
