= Port of Victoria =

The Port of Victoria may refer to:

- Port of Victoria (Texas)
- Port of Victoria (Seychelles)

== See also ==
- Port Victoria (disambiguation)
