= Victoria Quay, Edinburgh =

Coordinates: 55°58′41.45″N 3°10′24.48″W

Victoria Quay
- Scottish Gaelic Cidhe Bhictòria
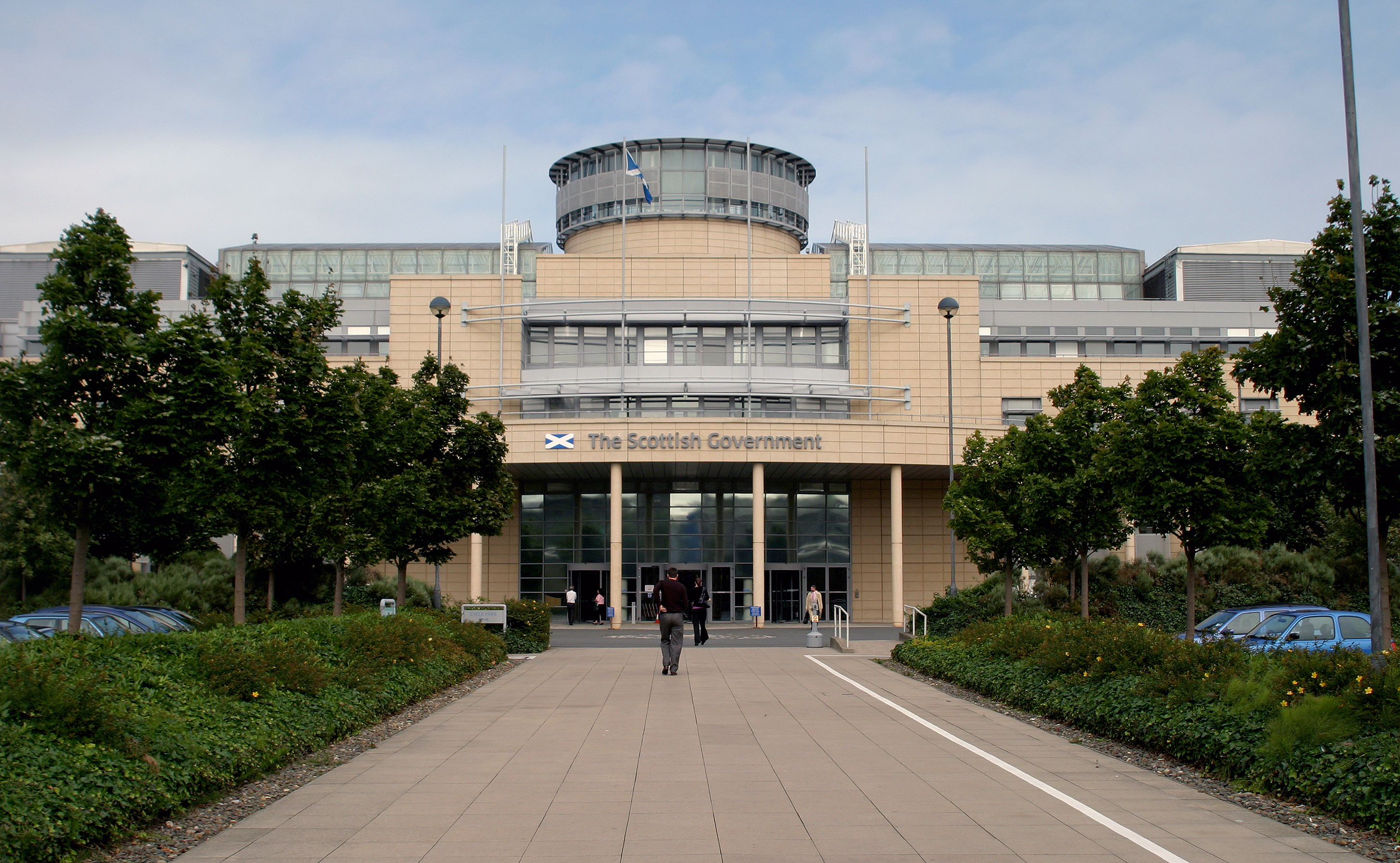
- Front elevation of Victoria Quay
- Interactive map of the Victoria Quay area

General information
- Status: Completed
- Type: Government building
- Location: Victoria Quay, Victoria Quay, Leith, Edinburgh, Scotland
- Current tenants: Scottish Government
- Construction started: 1993
- Opened: 1996

Other information
- Parking: 672 car parking spaces (incl. 79 for visitors)
- Public transit: Nearest railway terminal: Edinburgh Waverley railway station

Website
- Scottish Government

Victoria Quay (VQ) (Cidhe Bhictòria in Scottish Gaelic) is a Scottish Government building situated in Leith, Edinburgh, relatively close to the HRY Britannia museum ship.

== History ==
The building was set on redeveloped dockland and housed parts of what was then known as the Scottish Office. With the advent of parliamentary devolution in 1999, these offices became part of the then Scottish Executive, now the Scottish Government. It was intended that some 1,500 civil servants would work at Victoria Quay.

The building was designed by Robert Matthew Johnson Marshall, and there are some prominent nods to naval architecture in the design. Its construction began in 1993, and it was officially opened by Queen Elizabeth on Monday 1 July 1996.

This building launched Leith's regeneration programme proper. New luxury flats, converted bond warehouses, bistros, bars, and restaurants followed. Until Victoria Quay opened, most of these official posts were at New St. Andrew's House (NSAH) on James Craig Walk, Jeffrey Street and Brandon Street in central Edinburgh. New St. Andrew's House (NSAH) was closed in phases from 1995 to 1996 as a result of the presence of asbestos in the building, and lay empty until demolition in 2017.
