= Port Victoria =

Port Victoria may refer to:

- Casamar, a coastal fort in Tarfaya, Morocco, also known as Port Victoria
- Lyttelton Harbour, formerly known as Port Victoria, part of Banks Peninsula, New Zealand
- Port Victoria, name used of the failed Port Essington colony in North Australia 1838–1849
- Port Victoria, the name of the port in Victoria, Seychelles
- Port Victoria, Kenya, a town in Busia County, Kenya
- Port Victoria, South Australia
- Port Victoria Marine Experimental Aircraft Depot, former aircraft manufacturer in Kent, England
- Port Victoria railway station, a former railway station in Kent, England

== See also ==
- Port of Victoria (disambiguation)
