= Energy in Scotland =

The primary sources of electricity generation in Scotland are provided through renewable energy (61.8%), nuclear (25.7%) and fossil fuel generation (10.9%). Whitelee Wind Farm is the largest onshore wind farm in the United Kingdom, and was Europe's largest onshore wind farm for some time. Tidal power is an emerging source of renewable energy in Scotland. The MeyGen tidal stream energy plant in the north of the country is claimed to be the largest tidal stream energy project in the world.

== Energy consumption ==
The total final energy consumption in Scotland was just over 64.5 TWh, split approximately two-thirds gas to one-third electricity. Both gas and electricity consumption has continued to decline, down 70% and 74% from 2005 levels respectively.

Final electricity and gas consumption in Scotland in 2023 (GWh), and percentage change from 2022
	Domestic	Non-domestic	Total
Gas	25,133 (+1.1%)	17,608 (-1.9%)	42,741 (-2.0%)
Electricity	8,694 (+2%)	13,068 (-7%)	21,763 (-0.7%)
Total	33,827	30,676	64,504

== Production of electricity ==
In 2020, 98.6% of all electricity used in Scotland was from renewable sources. This is minus net exports. Between October 2021 and September 2022 63.1% of all electricity generated in Scotland was from renewable sources, 83.6% was classed as low carbon and 14.5% was from fossil fuels. The Scottish Government has a target to have the equivalent of 50% of the energy for Scotland's heat, transport and electricity consumption to be supplied from renewable sources by 2030. They have stated that, in 2022, the equivalent of 113% of the country's overall electrical consumption was produced by renewable energy, making it the highest recorded figure of renewable energy generated to date.

Over the past two decades, the annual electricity generation in Scotland has been around 50 TWh. Prior to 2010, around half of this was from fossil fuels. There has been significant growth in wind power, which now comprises more than half of all electricity generation in Scotland. Bioenergy contributes around 5% and grid-scale solar power almost 1%. In 2023, Scotland exported 13.85 TWh to England and 2.03 TWh to Northern Ireland, approximately 35% of the total generated.

Electricity generation in Scotland 2004-2023 by fuel

== Sources of energy ==
=== Nuclear energy ===
Scotland has a long history of nuclear research and electricity generation. Nuclear energy consistently accounts for 20-80% of the electric supply in Scotland depending on weather conditions for wind power generation and electricity demand. As of 2022, there is only one remaining operating nuclear power station in Scotland (Torness).

The Scottish National Party (SNP) government elected in 2007 had a 'no new nuclear power strategy'. This position is at odds with UK government policy which in January 2008 announced the go-ahead for new nuclear power stations to be built across the United Kingdom. In response, Scotland's then First Minister Alex Salmond commented there was 'no chance' of new nuclear power stations being built in Scotland. The Parliament voted 63–58 to support the policy of opposing new nuclear power stations, taking advantage of a loophole which permits a veto on planning, despite lacking authority over the UK energy policy. Others support nuclear as part of a sustainable, clean energy policy.

=== Renewable energy ===
The production of renewable energy in Scotland is a topic that came to the fore in technical, economic, and political terms during the opening years of the 21st century. The natural resource base for renewable energy is high by European, and even global standards, with the most important potential sources being wind, wave, and tide. Renewables generate almost all of Scotland's electricity, mostly from the country's wind power.

In 2020, Scotland had 12 gigawatts (GW) of renewable electricity capacity, which produced about a quarter of total UK renewable generation. In decreasing order of capacity, Scotland's renewable generation comes from onshore wind, hydropower, offshore wind, solar PV and biomass. Scotland exports much of this electricity. On 26 January 2024, the Scottish Government confirmed that 113% of Scotland's overall electricity consumption in 2022 was from renewable energy sources, making it the highest percentage figure ever recorded for renewable energy consumption in Scotland. It was hailed as "a significant milestone in Scotland's journey to net zero" by the Cabinet Secretary for Wellbeing Economy, Fair Work and Energy, Neil Gray. It becomes the first time that Scotland produced more renewable energy than it actually consumed, and demonstrates the "enormous potential of Scotland's green economy" as claimed by Gray.

Continuing improvements in engineering and economics are enabling more of the renewable resources to be used. Fears regarding fuel poverty and climate change have driven the subject high up the political agenda. In 2020 a quarter of total energy consumption, including heat and transportation, was met from renewables, and the Scottish government target is half by 2030. Although the finances of some projects remain speculative or dependent on market incentives, there has been a significant—and, in all likelihood, long-term—change in the underpinning economics.

=== Oil and gas ===
98% of oil and gas production in the United Kingdom as a whole comes from offshore fields and the services industry in Aberdeen has been a leader in developing technology for hydrocarbon extraction offshore.

Oil comes mainly from the North Sea Central Graben close to the median line with Norway in two main clusters – around the Forties oilfield east of Aberdeen and the Brent oilfield east of Shetland. There have been recent discoveries in challenging conditions west of Shetland.

Most of the largest oil fields in the UK sector of the North Sea were found in the waters to the north and east of the Scottish mainland, with the most northerly fields found to the east of the Orkney and the Shetland Islands. Aberdeen became the centre of Britain's North Sea oil industry, with many oil terminals such as that of Sullom Voe in Shetland and Flotta in Orkney and at Cruden Bay and St Fergus on the north-eastern coast of Scotland being built to support the North Sea oil industry. In the early 1970s, there was a great deal of economic turbulence with the 1973 oil price shock, which was caused by the Yom Kippur War. That resulted in rising inflation, high unemployment and a recession, a situation known as stagflation, in Scotland and the rest of the United Kingdom.

== See also ==
- Nuclear power in the United Kingdom
- Renewable energy in the United Kingdom
- Oil and gas industry in the United Kingdom
