= List of acts of the Scottish Parliament from 2024 =

This is a list of acts of the Scottish Parliament passed in 2024. Acts of the Scottish Parliament are enacted by the Scottish Parliament, which has legislative authority over devolved matters in relation to Scotland under the authority of the Scotland Act 1998. Acts are cited by calendar year, in the same fashion as acts of Parliament of the United Kingdom. Each act passed in a respective year is numbered consecutively with Arabic numerals, following the prefix "asp".

15 acts of the Scottish Parliament were passed in 2024.

indicates that an act has been transcribed on Wikisource, indicates that an act is available to view at legislation.gov.uk, and indicates the location of the original act in the Parliamentary Archives.

== Acts of the Scottish Parliament ==
Short title	Citation	Royal assent
Long title
United Nations Convention on the Rights of the Child (Incorporation) (Scotland) Act 2024	2024 asp 1	16 January 2024
An Act of the Scottish Parliament to incorporate in Scots law rights and obligations set out in the United Nations Convention on the Rights of the Child; (Note: Convention on the Rights of the Child) to make related provision to ensure compliance with duties relating to the Convention; and for connected purposes.
Trusts and Succession (Scotland) Act 2024	2024 asp 2	30 January 2024
An Act of the Scottish Parliament to make further provision as regards trusts; to make provision about the effect of divorce, dissolution or annulment on a special destination and about the rights of succession to an intestate estate; and for connected purposes.
Budget (Scotland) Act 2024	2024 asp 3	28 March 2024
An Act of the Scottish Parliament to make provision, for financial year 2024/25, for the use of resources by the Scottish Administration and certain bodies whose expenditure is payable out of the Scottish Consolidated Fund, for the maximum amounts of borrowing by certain statutory bodies and for authorising the payment of sums out of the Fund; to make provision, for financial year 2025/26, for authorising the payment of sums out of the Fund on a temporary basis; and for connected purposes.
Wildlife Management and Muirburn (Scotland) Act 2024	2024 asp 4	30 April 2024
An Act of the Scottish Parliament to make provision for the management of wildlife through the prohibition of glue traps and snares and regulation of other wildlife traps and the licensing of land on which certain birds are to be killed or taken; and for the licensing of the making of muirburn; and for connected purposes.
Children (Care and Justice) (Scotland) Act 2024	2024 asp 5	4 June 2024
An Act of the Scottish Parliament to make provision to bring all under 18s within the scope of the children’s hearings system and about the measures that may be included in compulsory supervision orders, the provision of information to certain persons as to disposals made by the hearings system, and about supervision and guidance for children after age 18; to make provision treating under 18s as children for the purposes of the criminal justice system and about how children are treated in that system, including providing for new safeguards for children in court, the circumstances in which courts must seek advice from a children’s hearing or remit the case to a hearing for disposal, the court’s power to impose driving disqualifications and penalty points despite so remitting, the operation of sexual offences notification requirements on such remittal, and the use of secure accommodation, and removing the option of young offenders institutions and remand centres, when detaining children; to make changes to provision on secure accommodation and the regulation of secure accommodation services, including those services which take children from other parts of the United Kingdom; to change the age at which a person is a child for the purposes of antisocial behaviour orders; to repeal provisions on the named person service and on child’s plans; to make provision about UNCRC compatibility issues in relation to decisions to prosecute children; and for connected purposes.
Post Office (Horizon System) Offences (Scotland) Act 2024	2024 asp 6	13 June 2024
An Act of the Scottish Parliament to provide for the quashing of certain convictions for offences of dishonesty connected to the carrying on of a post office business at a time when the Horizon system was in use; to provide for the deletion of details of alternatives to prosecution in relation to such offences; and for connected purposes.
Housing (Cladding Remediation) (Scotland) Act 2024	2024 asp 7	21 June 2024
An Act of the Scottish Parliament to confer on the Scottish Ministers powers to identify external wall cladding systems on residential buildings that create or exacerbate risks to human life and to address those risks; to establish a register to record that a building’s cladding has been assessed and that remediation works have been completed; to enable one or more schemes to be established to require persons in the building industry to contribute towards assessing and remediating dangerous cladding; and for connected purposes.
Visitor Levy (Scotland) Act 2024	2024 asp 8	5 July 2024
An Act of the Scottish Parliament to give local authorities the power to impose a levy in respect of persons staying in certain types of accommodation overnight.
Bankruptcy and Diligence (Scotland) Act 2024	2024 asp 9	15 July 2024
An Act of the Scottish Parliament to make provision to establish a mental health moratorium; to modify the Bankruptcy (Scotland) Act 2016; (Note: Bankruptcy (Scotland) Act 2016 (asp 21)) and to modify the law of diligence.
Abortion Services (Safe Access Zones) (Scotland) Act 2024	2024 asp 10	22 July 2024
An Act of the Scottish Parliament to create safe access zones around premises that provide treatment for the termination of pregnancy authorised under the Abortion Act 1967. (Note: Abortion Act 1967 (c. 87))
Agriculture and Rural Communities (Scotland) Act 2024	2024 asp 11	30 July 2024
An Act of the Scottish Parliament to make provision enabling the support of agriculture, rural communities and the rural economy through the creation of a framework for that support; to make provision for continuing professional development for those involved in agriculture and related industries, to make provision in relation to the welfare and identification of animals, to repeal spent and superseded agricultural enactments; and for connected purposes.
Gender Representation on Public Boards (Amendment) (Scotland) Act 2024	2024 asp 12	1 August 2024
An Act of the Scottish Parliament to make provision enabling the support of agriculture, rural communities and the rural economy through the creation of a framework for that support; to make provision for continuing professional development for those involved in agriculture and related industries, to make provision in relation to the welfare and identification of animals, to repeal spent and superseded agricultural enactments; and for connected purposes.
Circular Economy (Scotland) Act 2024	2024 asp 13	8 August 2024
An Act of the Scottish Parliament to require the Scottish Ministers to prepare and publish a circular economy strategy; to make provision about circular economy targets; to make provision about the reduction, recycling and management of waste; and for connected purposes.
Aggregates Tax and Devolved Taxes Administration (Scotland) Act 2024	2024 asp 14	12 November 2024
An An Act of the Scottish Parliament to make provision for a tax on the commercial exploitation of aggregate; and to make further provision about the administration of devolved taxes.
Climate Change (Emissions Reduction Targets) (Scotland) Act 2024	2024 asp 15	22 November 2024
An Act of the Scottish Parliament to modify the Climate Change (Scotland) Act 2009 (Note: Climate Change (Scotland) Act 2009 (asp 12)) in relation to the targets for the reduction of greenhouse gas emissions; and for connected purposes.

== See also ==
- List of acts of the Scottish Parliament
