= List of Scottish statutory instruments, 2011 =

This is a complete list of Scottish statutory instruments in 2011.

== 1-100 ==
- The Community Payback Orders (Prescribed Persons for Consultation) (Scotland) Regulations 2011 (S.S.I. 2011 No. 1)
- The M80/A80 Trunk Road (A80 Off Slip to the A8011 at Lowwoods) (Temporary Prohibition of Traffic) Order 2011 (S.S.I. 2011 No. 2)
- The Restriction of Liberty Order and Restricted Movement Requirement (Scotland) Regulations 2011 (S.S.I. 2011 No. 3)
- The Interpretation and Legislative Reform (Scotland) Act 2010 (Commencement) Order 2011 (S.S.I. 2011 No. 4 (C. 1))
- The Council Tax (Discounts) (Scotland) Amendment Order 2011 (S.S.I. 2011 No. 5)
- The A78 Trunk Road (Greenock) (Traffic Management) Order 2011 (S.S.I. 2011 No. 6)
- The Crime (International Co-operation) Act 2003 (Designation of Participating Countries) (Scotland) Order 2011 (S.S.I. 2011 No. 7)
- The Children's Hearings (Scotland) Act 2011 (Commencement No. 1) Order 2011 (S.S.I. 2011 No. 8 (C. 2))
- The M80/A80 Trunk Road (Robroyston to Bankhead), M73 Trunk Road (Gartcosh to Mollinsburn) and Moodiesburn Bypass Trunk Road (Hornshill to Mollinsburn) (Temporary 40 mph Speed Restriction) Order 2011 (S.S.I. 2011 No. 9)
- The M8 (Baillieston to Newhouse) Special Road Scheme 2011 (S.S.I. 2011 No. 10)
- The A8 Trunk Road (Baillieston to Newhouse) Order 2011 (S.S.I. 2011 No. 11)
- The A725 Trunk Road (Baillieston to Newhouse) Order 2011 (S.S.I. 2011 No. 12)
- The Advice and Assistance (Assistance By Way of Representation) (Scotland) Amendment Regulations 2011 (S.S.I. 2011 No. 13)
- The Waverley Railway (Scotland) Act 2006 (Extension of Time for Land Acquisition) Order 2011 (S.S.I. 2011 No. 14)
- The South West Unit Trunk Roads Area (Temporary Prohibitions of Traffic, Temporary Prohibitions of Overtaking and Temporary Speed Restrictions) (No.1) Order 2011 (S.S.I. 2011 No. 15)
- The South East Unit Trunk Roads Area (Temporary Prohibitions of Traffic, Temporary Prohibitions of Overtaking and Temporary Speed Restrictions) (No.1) Order 2011 (S.S.I. 2011 No. 16)
- The Interpretation and Legislative Reform (Scotland) Act 2010 (Commencement No. 2 and Transitional Provision) Order 2011 (S.S.I. 2011 No. 17 (C. 3))
- The North West Unit Trunk Roads Area (Temporary Prohibitions of Traffic, Temporary Prohibitions of Overtaking and Temporary Speed Restrictions) (No.1) Order 2011 (S.S.I. 2011 No. 18)
- The North East Unit Trunk Roads Area (Temporary Prohibitions of Traffic, Temporary Prohibitions of Overtaking and Temporary Speed Restrictions) (No. 1) Order 2011 (S.S.I. 2011 No. 19)
- The Charities and Trustee Investment (Scotland) Act 2005 (Commencement No. 5) Order 2011 (S.S.I. 2011 No. 20 (C. 4))
- Act of Adjournal (Criminal Procedure Rules Amendment) (Community Payback Orders) 2011 (S.S.I. 2011 No. 21)
- The Public Appointments and Public Bodies etc. (Scotland) Act 2003 (Amendment of Specified Authorities) Order 2011 (S.S.I. 2011 No. 22)
- The Sale of Tobacco (Registration of Moveable Structures and Fixed Penalty Notices) (Scotland) Regulations 2011 (S.S.I. 2011 No. 23)
- The Storage of Carbon Dioxide (Licensing etc.) (Scotland) Regulations 2011 (S.S.I. 2011 No. 24)
- The Criminal Justice and Licensing (Scotland) Act 2010 (Consequential and Supplementary Provisions) Order 2011 (S.S.I. 2011 No. 25)
- The Social Care and Social Work Improvement Scotland (Requirements for Reports) Regulations 2011 (S.S.I. 2011 No. 26)
- The Social Care and Social Work Improvement Scotland (Fees) Order 2011 (S.S.I. 2011 No. 27)
- The Social Care and Social Work Improvement Scotland (Registration) Regulations 2011 (S.S.I. 2011 No. 28)
- The Social Care and Social Work Improvement Scotland (Applications) Order 2011 (S.S.I. 2011 No. 29)
- The Public Services Reform (Scotland) Act 2010 (Commencement No. 3) Order 2011 (S.S.I. 2011 No. 30 (C. 5))
- The Bankruptcy and Diligence etc. (Scotland) Act 2007 (Commencement No. 7 and Transitionals) Order 2011 (S.S.I. 2011 No. 31 (C. 6))
- The National Health Service (Pharmaceutical Services) (Scotland) Amendment Regulations 2011 (S.S.I. 2011 No. 32)
- The Healthcare Improvement Scotland (Fees) Regulations 2011 (S.S.I. 2011 No. 33)
- The Healthcare Improvement Scotland (Requirements for Reports) Regulations 2011 (S.S.I. 2011 No. 34)
- The Healthcare Improvement Scotland (Applications and Registration) Regulations 2011 (S.S.I. 2011 No. 35)
- The NHS Quality Improvement Scotland (Dissolution) Order 2011 (S.S.I. 2011 No. 36)
- The A7 Trunk Road (Langholm)(Temporary Width Restriction) Order 2011 (S.S.I. 2011 No. 37)
- The Forth Crossing Act 2011 (Commencement) Order 2011 (S.S.I. 2011 No. 38 (C. 7))
- The Control of Dogs (Scotland) Act 2010 (Prescribed Form of Notice) Order 2011 (S.S.I. 2011 No. 39)
- The Interests of Members of the Scottish Parliament Act 2006 (Modifications to the Schedule) Resolution 2011 (S.S.I. 2011 No. 40)
- The Legal Aid and Advice and Assistance (Solicitors’ Travel Fees) (Scotland) Regulations 2011 (S.S.I. 2011 No. 41)
- The Teachers’ Superannuation (Scotland) Amendment Regulations 2011 (S.S.I. 2011 No. 42)
- The Scottish Road Works Register (Prescribed Fees) Regulations 2011 (S.S.I. 2011 No. 43)
- The Scottish Charitable Incorporated Organisations Regulations 2011 (S.S.I. 2011 No. 44)
- The Sexual Offences Act 2003 (Remedial) (Scotland) Order 2011 (S.S.I. 2011 No. 45)
- The Rabies (Importation of Dogs, Cats and Other Mammals) Amendment (Scotland) Order 2011 (S.S.I. 2011 No. 46)
- Act of Sederunt (Fees of Sheriff Officers) 2011 (S.S.I. 2011 No. 47)
- Act of Sederunt (Fees of Messengers-at-Arms) 2011 (S.S.I. 2011 No. 48)
- The A96 Trunk Road (Elgin) (40 mph Speed Limit) Order 2011 (S.S.I. 2011 No. 49)
- The A96 Trunk Road (Elgin) (30 mph Speed Limit) Order 2011 (S.S.I. 2011 No. 50)
- The Brucellosis (Scotland) Amendment Order 2011 (S.S.I. 2011 No. 51)
- The Teachers’ Superannuation (Scotland) Amendment (No. 2) Regulations 2011 (S.S.I. 2011 No. 52)
- The National Health Service (Superannuation Scheme and Pension Scheme) (Scotland) Amendment Regulations 2011 (S.S.I. 2011 No. 53)
- The Edinburgh College of Art (Transfer) (Scotland) Order 2011 (S.S.I. 2011 No. 54)
- The National Health Service (Free Prescriptions and Charges for Drugs and Appliances) (Scotland) Regulations 2011 (S.S.I. 2011 No. 55)
- The Home Energy Assistance Scheme (Scotland) Amendment Regulations 2011 (S.S.I. 2011 No. 56)
- The Marine Licensing (Exempted Activities) (Scottish Offshore Region) Order 2011 (S.S.I. 2011 No. 57)
- The Marine (Scotland) Act 2010 (Commencement No. 2 and Transitional Provisions) Order 2011 (S.S.I. 2011 No. 58 (C. 8))
- The Sea Fishing (EU Recording and Reporting Requirements) (Scotland) Amendment Order 2011 (S.S.I. 2011 No. 59)
- The Aquaculture and Fisheries (Scotland) Act 2007 (Fixed Penalty Notices) Amendment Order 2011 (S.S.I. 2011 No. 60)
- The Scottish Crime and Drug Enforcement Agency (Scotland) Regulations 2011 (S.S.I. 2011 No. 61)
- The Police Grant (Scotland) Order 2011 (S.S.I. 2011 No. 62)
- The Muntjac Keeping (Scotland) Regulations 2011 (S.S.I. 2011 No. 63)
- The Local Authority Accounts (Scotland) Amendment Regulations 2011 (S.S.I. 2011 No. 64)
- The Fire and Rescue Authorities (Appointment of Chief Inspector) (Scotland) Order 2011 (S.S.I. 2011 No. 65)
- The A9 Trunk Road (Faskally) (Temporary Prohibition of Specified Turns) Order 2011 (S.S.I. 2011 No. 66)
- The Ayr Road Route (M77) (Speed Limit) Amendment Regulations 2011 (S.S.I. 2011 No. 67)
- The M8 Motorway (Junction 10 Westerhouse Slip Roads) (Speed Limit) Regulations 2011 (S.S.I. 2011 No. 68)
- The Glasgow Renfrew Motorway (Stages I and II) (Speed Limit) Amendment Regulations 2011 (S.S.I. 2011 No. 69)
- The Sea Fishing (Licences and Notices) (Scotland) Regulations 2011 (S.S.I. 2011 No. 70)
- The Personal Injuries (NHS Charges) (Amounts) (Scotland) Amendment Regulations 2011 (S.S.I. 2011 No. 71)
- The Crofting Counties Agricultural Grants (Scotland) Variation Scheme 2011 (S.S.I. 2011 No. 72)
- The Less Favoured Area Support Scheme (Scotland) Amendment Regulations 2011 (S.S.I. 2011 No. 73)
- The Non-Domestic Rates (Levying) (Scotland) Amendment Regulations 2011 (S.S.I. 2011 No. 74)
- The Non-Domestic Rating (Valuation of Utilities) (Scotland) Amendment Order 2011 (S.S.I. 2011 No. 75)
- The Non-Domestic Rates (Levying) (Scotland) (No. 3) Regulations 2010 Revocation Order 2011 (S.S.I. 2011 No. 76)
- The Sheep Scab (Scotland) Amendment Order 2011 (S.S.I. 2011 No. 77)
- The Marine Licensing (Fees) (Scotland) Regulations 2011 (S.S.I. 2011 No. 78)
- The Marine Licensing (Consultees) (Scotland) Order 2011 (S.S.I. 2011 No. 79)
- The Marine Licensing (Register of Licensing Information) (Scotland) Regulations 2011 (S.S.I. 2011 No. 80)
- The Reporting of Prices of Milk Products (Scotland) Amendment Regulations 2011 (S.S.I. 2011 No. 81)
- The Milk and Milk Products (Pupils in Educational Establishments) (Scotland) Amendment Regulations 2011 (S.S.I. 2011 No. 82)
- The Dairy Produce Quotas (Scotland) Amendment Regulations 2011 (S.S.I. 2011 No. 83)
- The Drinking Milk (Scotland) Regulations 2011 (S.S.I. 2011 No. 84)
- The Rural Development Contracts (Land Managers Options) (Scotland) Amendment Regulations 2011 (S.S.I. 2011 No. 85)
- Act of Sederunt (Fees of Solicitors in the Sheriff Court) (Amendment) 2011 (S.S.I. 2011 No. 86)
- Act of Sederunt (Rules of the Court of Session Amendment) (Taxation of Accounts and Fees of Solicitors) 2011 (S.S.I. 2011 No. 87)
- The Interpretation and Legislative Reform (Scotland) Act 2010 (Savings and Transitional Provisions) Order 2011 (S.S.I. 2011 No. 88)
- The Disabled Persons (Badges for Motor Vehicles) (Scotland) Amendment Regulations 2011 (S.S.I. 2011 No. 89)
- The Officers of Court's Professional Association (Scotland) Regulations 2011 (S.S.I. 2011 No. 90)
- The Road Works (Inspection Fees) (Scotland) Amendment Regulations 2011 (S.S.I. 2011 No. 91)
- The Road Works (Fixed Penalty) (Scotland) Amendment Regulations 2011 (S.S.I. 2011 No. 92)
- The Official Feed and Food Controls (Scotland) Amendment Regulations 2011 (S.S.I. 2011 No. 93)
- The Natural Mineral Water, Spring Water and Bottled Drinking Water (Scotland) Amendment Regulations 2011 (S.S.I. 2011 No. 94)
- The Food (Jelly Mini-Cups) (Emergency Control) (Scotland) Revocation Regulations 2011 (S.S.I. 2011 No. 95)
- The Housing (Scotland) Act 2010 (Commencement No. 2, Transitional, Transitory and Saving Provisions) Order 2011 (S.S.I. 2011 No. 96 (C. 9))
- The Right to Purchase (Application Form) (Scotland) Order 2011 (S.S.I. 2011 No. 97)
- The Roads (Scotland) Act 1984 (Fixed Penalty) Amendment Regulations 2011 (S.S.I. 2011 No. 98)
- The Food Additives (Scotland) Amendment Regulations 2011 (S.S.I. 2011 No. 99)
- The Plastic Materials and Articles in Contact with Food (Scotland) Amendment Regulations 2011 (S.S.I. 2011 No. 100)

== 101–200 ==
- The Healthy Start Scheme (Prescribed Description of Food) (Scotland) Regulations 2011 (S.S.I. 2011 No. 101)
- The Additional Support for Learning (Sources of Information) (Scotland) Amendment Order 2011 (S.S.I. 2011 No. 102)
- The Additional Support Needs Tribunals for Scotland (Appointment of President, Conveners and Members and Disqualification) Amendment Regulations 2011 (S.S.I. 2011 No. 103)
- The Additional Support Needs Tribunals for Scotland (Disability Claims Procedure) Rules 2011 (S.S.I. 2011 No. 104)
- The Additional Support Needs Tribunals for Scotland (Practice and Procedure) Amendment Rules 2011 (S.S.I. 2011 No. 105)
- The Rural Development Contracts (Rural Priorities) (Scotland) Amendment Regulations 2011 (S.S.I. 2011 No. 106)
- The Individual Learning Account (Scotland) Regulations 2011 (S.S.I. 2011 No. 107)
- The South West Unit Trunk Roads Area (Temporary Prohibitions of Traffic, Temporary Prohibitions of Overtaking and Temporary Speed Restrictions) (No. 2) Order 2011 (S.S.I. 2011 No. 108)
- The Local Government Finance (Scotland) Order 2011 (S.S.I. 2011 No. 109)
- The South East Unit Trunk Roads Area (Temporary Prohibitions of Traffic, Temporary Prohibitions of Overtaking and Temporary Speed Restrictions) (No.2) Order 2011 (S.S.I. 2011 No. 110)
- The Children's Hearings (Scotland) Act 2011 (Commencement No. 2) Order 2011 (S.S.I. 2011 No. 111 (C. 10))
- The North West Unit Trunk Roads Area (Temporary Prohibitions of Traffic, Temporary Prohibitions of Overtaking and Temporary Speed Restrictions) (No.2) Order 2011 (S.S.I. 2011 No. 112)
- The Ethical Standards in Public Life etc. (Scotland) Act 2000 (Devolved Public Bodies and Stipulated Time Limit) and the Freedom of Information (Scotland) Act 2002 (Scottish Public Authorities) Amendment Order 2011 (S.S.I. 2011 No. 113)
- The North East Unit Trunk Roads Area (Temporary Prohibitions of Traffic, Temporary Prohibitions of Overtaking and Temporary Speed Restrictions) (No. 2) Order 2011 (S.S.I. 2011 No. 114)
- The Electricity Act 1989 (Requirement of Consent for Hydro-electric Generating Stations) (Scotland) Revocation Order 2011 (S.S.I. 2011 No. 115)
- The Environmental Liability (Scotland) Amendment Regulations 2011 (S.S.I. 2011 No. 116)
- The National Health Service Superannuation Scheme (Scotland) Regulations 2011 (S.S.I. 2011 No. 117)
- The British Waterways Board (Forth and Clyde and Union Canals) (Reclassification) Order 2011 (S.S.I. 2011 No. 118)
- The Provision of Water and Sewerage Services (Reasonable Cost) (Scotland) Regulations 2011 (S.S.I. 2011 No. 119)
- The Building (Scotland) Amendment Regulations 2011 (S.S.I. 2011 No. 120)
- The Public Services Reform (Scotland) Act 2010 (Health and Social Care) Savings and Transitional Provisions Order 2011 (S.S.I. 2011 No. 121)
- The Public Services Reform (Scotland) Act 2010 (Commencement No. 4) Order 2011 (S.S.I. 2011 No. 122 (C. 11))
- The National Assistance (Sums for Personal Requirements) (Scotland) Regulations 2011 (S.S.I. 2011 No. 123)
- The National Assistance (Assessment of Resources) Amendment (Scotland) Regulations 2011 (S.S.I. 2011 No. 124)
- The Public Services Reform (Scotland) Act 2010 Social Care and Social Work Improvement Scotland (Transfer of Staff) Order 2011 (S.S.I. 2011 No. 125)
- The Edinburgh Tram (Line One) Act 2006 (Extension of Time for Land Acquisition) Order 2011 (S.S.I. 2011 No. 126)
- The Edinburgh Tram (Line Two) Act 2006 (Extension of Time for Land Acquisition) Order 2011 (S.S.I. 2011 No. 127)
- The Licensing (Food Hygiene Requirements) (Scotland) Order 2011 (S.S.I. 2011 No. 128)
- The Sale and Hire of Crossbows, Knives and certain other Articles to Children and Young Persons (Scotland) Order 2011 (S.S.I. 2011 No. 129)
- The Licensing (Local Licensing Forum) (Scotland) Order 2011 (S.S.I. 2011 No. 130)
- The Tobacco and Primary Medical Services (Scotland) Act 2010 (Commencement No. 1, Consequential and Saving Provisions) Amendment Order 2011 (S.S.I. 2011 No. 131)
- The Sale of Tobacco (Display of Warning Statements) (Scotland) Regulations 2011 (S.S.I. 2011 No. 132)
- The Parole Board (Scotland) Amendment Rules 2011 (S.S.I. 2011 No. 133)
- The Advice and Assistance and Civil Legal Aid (Special Urgency and Property Recovered or Preserved) (Scotland) Regulations 2011 (S.S.I. 2011 No. 134)
- The Criminal Legal Aid (Scotland) (Fees) Amendment Regulations 2011 (S.S.I. 2011 No. 135)
- The Town and Country Planning (General Permitted Development) (Non-Domestic Microgeneration) (Scotland) Amendment Order 2011 (S.S.I. 2011 No. 136)
- The Extreme Pornography (Electronic Commerce Directive) (Scotland) Regulations 2011 (S.S.I. 2011 No. 137)
- The Town and Country Planning (Miscellaneous Amendments) (Scotland) Regulations 2011 (S.S.I. 2011 No. 138)
- The Town and Country Planning (Environmental Impact Assessment) (Scotland) Regulations 2011 (S.S.I. 2011 No. 139)
- The Insolvency Act 1986 Amendment (Appointment of Receivers) (Scotland) Regulations 2011 (S.S.I. 2011 No. 140)
- The Debt Arrangement Scheme (Scotland) Regulations 2011 (S.S.I. 2011 No. 141)
- The Bankruptcy Fees (Scotland) Amendment Regulations 2011 (S.S.I. 2011 No. 142)
- The Children's Hearings (Scotland) Act 2011 (National Convener Appeal against Dismissal) Regulations 2011 (S.S.I. 2011 No. 143)
- The Town and Country Planning (Marine Fish Farms Permitted Development) (Scotland) Order 2011 (S.S.I. 2011 No. 144)
- The Town and Country Planning (Marine Fish Farming) (Scotland) Amendment Regulations 2011 (S.S.I. 2011 No. 145)
- The Disclosure (Persons engaged in the Investigation and Reporting of Crime or Sudden Deaths) (Scotland) Regulations 2011 (S.S.I. 2011 No. 146)
- The Radioactive Substances Exemption (Scotland) Order 2011 (S.S.I. 2011 No. 147)
- The Police Grant (Carry-forward Percentages) (Scotland) Order 2011 (S.S.I. 2011 No. 148)
- The Alcohol etc. (Scotland) Act 2010 (Commencement) Order 2011 (S.S.I. 2011 No. 149 (C. 12))
- The Licensing (Scotland) Act 2005 (Consequential Provisions) Order 2011 (S.S.I. 2011 No. 150)
- The Licensing (Minor Variations) (Scotland) Regulations 2011 (S.S.I. 2011 No. 151)
- The Food Labelling (Declaration of Allergens) (Scotland) Regulations 2011 (S.S.I. 2011 No. 152)
- The Fruit Juices and Fruit Nectars (Scotland) Amendment Regulations 2011 (S.S.I. 2011 No. 153)
- The Police Pensions (Amendment) (Scotland) Regulations 2011 (S.S.I. 2011 No. 154)
- The Conservation (Natural Habitats, &c.) Amendment (Scotland) Regulations 2011 (S.S.I. 2011 No. 155)
- The Healthcare Improvement Scotland (Transfer of Property) Order 2011 (S.S.I. 2011 No. 156)
- The Protection of Vulnerable Groups (Scotland) Act 2007 (Commencement No. 5, Savings, Transitional and Consequential Provisions) and the Criminal Justice and Licensing (Scotland) Act 2010 (Commencement No. 7, Savings and Transitional Provisions) Order 2011 (S.S.I. 2011 No. 157 (C. 13))
- The Removing from Heritable Property (Form of Charge) (Scotland) Regulations 2011 (S.S.I. 2011 No. 158)
- The Adoptions with a Foreign Element (Scotland) Amendment Regulations 2011 (S.S.I. 2011 No. 159)
- The Civil Legal Aid (Scotland) (Fees) Amendment Regulations 2011 (S.S.I. 2011 No. 160)
- The Advice and Assistance and Legal Aid (Online Applications etc.) (Scotland) Regulations 2011 (S.S.I. 2011 No. 161)
- The Criminal Legal Aid (Fixed Payments) (Scotland) Amendment Regulations 2011 (S.S.I. 2011 No. 162)
- The Criminal Legal Assistance (Duty Solicitors) (Scotland) Regulations 2011 (S.S.I. 2011 No. 163)
- The Prohibited Procedures on Protected Animals (Exemptions) (Scotland) Amendment Regulations 2011 (S.S.I. 2011 No. 164)
- Act of Sederunt (Rules of the Court of Session Amendment No. 2) (Fees of Shorthand Writers) 2011 (S.S.I. 2011 No. 165)
- Act of Sederunt (Fees of Shorthand Writers in the Sheriff Court) (Amendment) 2011 (S.S.I. 2011 No. 166)
- Act of Adjournal (Criminal Procedure Rules Amendment No. 2) (Protection of Vulnerable Groups (Scotland) Act 2007) 2011 (S.S.I. 2011 No. 167)
- The National Health Service (Dental Charges) (Scotland) Amendment Regulations 2011 (S.S.I. 2011 No. 168)
- The Public Services Reform (Scotland) Act 2010 (Health and Social Care) Savings and Transitional Provisions (No. 2) Order 2011 (S.S.I. 2011 No. 169)
- The Extreme Pornography (Electronic Commerce Directive) (Scotland) Amendment Regulations 2011 (S.S.I. 2011 No. 170)
- The Animal By-Products (Enforcement) (Scotland) Regulations 2011 (S.S.I. 2011 No. 171)
- The Muntjac Keeping (Scotland) Order 2011 (S.S.I. 2011 No. 172)
- The National Health Service Superannuation Scheme (Scotland) Amendment Regulations 2011 (S.S.I. 2011 No. 173)
- The Historic Environment (Amendment) (Scotland) Act 2011 (Commencement No. 1) Order 2011 (S.S.I. 2011 No. 174 (C. 14))
- The A96 Trunk Road (Alexandra Road, Elgin) (Prohibition of Specified Turns) Order 2011 (S.S.I. 2011 No. 175)
- The Tenancy Deposit Schemes (Scotland) Regulations 2011 (S.S.I. 2011 No. 176)
- The Licensing (Food Hygiene Requirements) (Scotland) (No. 2) Order 2011 (S.S.I. 2011 No. 177)
- The Criminal Justice and Licensing (Scotland) Act 2010 (Commencement No. 8, Transitional and Savings Provisions) Order 2011 (S.S.I. 2011 No. 178 (C. 15))
- The Bankruptcy and Diligence etc. (Scotland) Act 2007 (Commencement No. 8 and Transitional) Order 2011 (S.S.I. 2011 No. 179 (C. 16))
- The Legal Services (Scotland) Act 2010 (Commencement No. 1 and Saving Provision) Order 2011 (S.S.I. 2011 No. 180 (C. 17))
- The Housing (Scotland) Act 2010 (Commencement No. 3) Order 2011 (S.S.I. 2011 No. 181 (C. 18))
- The Healthcare Improvement Scotland (Requirements as to Independent Health Care Services) Regulations 2011 (S.S.I. 2011 No. 182)
- The Public Services Reform (Joint Inspections) (Scotland) Regulations 2011 (S.S.I. 2011 No. 183)
- The Healthcare Improvement Scotland (Inspections) Regulations 2011 (S.S.I. 2011 No. 184)
- The Public Services Reform (Social Services Inspections) (Scotland) Regulations 2011 (S.S.I. 2011 No. 185)
- The Children's Hearings (Scotland) Act 2011 (Consequential Provision) and Public Appointments and Public Bodies etc. (Scotland) Act 2003 (Amendment of Specified Authorities) Order 2011 (S.S.I. 2011 No. 186)
- The Licensing (Scotland) Act 2005 (Consequential Provisions) Amendment Order 2011 (S.S.I. 2011 No. 187)
- The Criminal Proceedings etc. (Reform) (Scotland) Act 2007 (Commencement No. 9) Order 2011 (S.S.I. 2011 No. 188 (C. 19))
- The Disposal of Court Records (Scotland) Amendment Regulations 2011 (S.S.I. 2011 No. 189)
- Act of Sederunt (Rules of the Court of Session Amendment No. 3) (Miscellaneous) 2011 (S.S.I. 2011 No. 190)
- Act of Sederunt (Valuation Appeal Rules Amendment) 2011 (S.S.I. 2011 No. 191)
- Act of Sederunt (Jurisdiction in Respect of Parental Responsibility and Measures for the Protection of Children Rules) 2011 (S.S.I. 2011 No. 192)
- Act of Sederunt (Sheriff Court Rules) (Miscellaneous Amendments) 2011 (S.S.I. 2011 No. 193)
- Act of Adjournal (Criminal Procedure Rules Amendment No. 3) (Miscellaneous) 2011 (S.S.I. 2011 No. 194)
- The Scottish Statutory Instruments Regulations 2011 (S.S.I. 2011 No. 195)
- The Interpretation and Legislative Reform (Scotland) Act 2010 (Consequential Provisions) Order 2011 (S.S.I. 2011 No. 196)
- The Retention of Samples etc. (Children's Hearings) (Scotland) Order 2011 (S.S.I. 2011 No. 197)
- The M8 Special Road (Baillieston to Newhouse) Appropriation Order 2011 (S.S.I. 2011 No. 198)
- The M8 (Baillieston to Newhouse) Special Road (Redetermination of Means of Exercise of Public Right of Passage) Order 2011 (S.S.I. 2011 No. 199)
- The M8 (Baillieston to Newhouse) Special Road (Side Roads) Order 2011 (S.S.I. 2011 No. 200)

== 201–300 ==
- The Antisocial Behaviour Notices (Houses Used for Holiday Purposes) (Scotland) Order 2011 (S.S.I. 2011 No. 201)
- The Marine (Scotland) Act 2010 (Transitional and Consequential Provisions) Order 2011 (S.S.I. 2011 No. 202)
- The Marine Licensing Appeals (Scotland) Regulations 2011 (S.S.I. 2011 No. 203)
- The Marine Licensing (Exempted Activities) (Scottish Inshore Region) Order 2011 (S.S.I. 2011 No. 204)
- The A87 Trunk Road (Portree) (40 mph and 30 mph Speed Limits) and Portree High School (Part-time 20 mph Speed Limit) Variation and Revocation Order 2011 (S.S.I. 2011 No. 205)
- The A85 Trunk Road (Oban) (Temporary Prohibition of Traffic) Order 2011 (S.S.I. 2011 No. 206)
- The Radioactive Substances Act 1993 Amendment (Scotland) Regulations 2011 (S.S.I. 2011 No. 207)
- The Scottish Public Services Ombudsman Act 2002 Amendment Order 2011 (S.S.I. 2011 No. 208)
- The Water Environment (Controlled Activities) (Scotland) Regulations 2011 (S.S.I. 2011 No. 209)
- The Social Care and Social Work Improvement Scotland (Requirements for Care Services) Regulations 2011 (S.S.I. 2011 No. 210)
- The Public Services Reform (Scotland) Act 2010 (Consequential Modifications) Order 2011 (S.S.I. 2011 No. 211)
- The Budget (Scotland) Act 2010 Amendment Order 2011 (S.S.I. 2011 No. 212)
- The A77 Trunk Road (Girvan) (Restricted Roads) Order 2011 (S.S.I. 2011 No. 213)
- The M80/A80 Trunk Road (Lowwoods Southbound On Slip) (Temporary 30 mph Speed Restriction) Order 2011 (S.S.I. 2011 No. 214)
- The Public Services Reform (General Teaching Council for Scotland) Order 2011 (S.S.I. 2011 No. 215)
- The Advice and Assistance (Assistance by Way of Representation) (Scotland) Amendment (No. 2) Regulations 2011 (S.S.I. 2011 No. 216)
- The Advice and Assistance and Civil Legal Aid (Financial Conditions and Contributions) (Scotland) Regulations 2011 (S.S.I. 2011 No. 217)
- The Local Government Finance (Scotland) Amendment Order 2011 (S.S.I. 2011 No. 218)
- The Local Government Finance (Scotland) Amendment (No. 2) Order 2011 (S.S.I. 2011 No. 219)
- The South West Unit Trunk Roads Area (Temporary Prohibitions of Traffic, Temporary Prohibitions of Overtaking and Temporary Speed Restrictions) (No. 3) Order 2011 (S.S.I. 2011 No. 220)
- The South East Unit Trunk Roads Area (Temporary Prohibitions of Traffic, Temporary Prohibitions of Overtaking and Temporary Speed Restrictions) (No.3) Order 2011 (S.S.I. 2011 No. 221)
- The North West Unit Trunk Roads Area (Temporary Prohibitions of Traffic, Temporary Prohibitions of Overtaking and Temporary Speed Restrictions) (No. 3) Order 2011 (S.S.I. 2011 No. 222)
- The North East Unit Trunk Roads Area (Temporary Prohibitions of Traffic, Temporary Prohibitions of Overtaking and Temporary Speed Restrictions) (No. 3) Order 2011 (S.S.I. 2011 No. 223)
- The Energy Act 2008 (Storage of Carbon Dioxide) (Scotland) Regulations 2011 (S.S.I. 2011 No. 224)
- The Renewables Obligation (Scotland) Amendment Order 2011 (S.S.I. 2011 No. 225)
- The Waste (Scotland) Regulations 2011 (S.S.I. 2011 No. 226)
- The Fundable Bodies (University of the Highlands and Islands) Order 2011 (S.S.I. 2011 No. 227)
- The Waste Management Licensing (Scotland) Regulations 2011 (S.S.I. 2011 No. 228)
- The Fundable Bodies (Royal Conservatoire of Scotland) Order 2011 (S.S.I. 2011 No. 229)
- The Community Care (Personal Care and Nursing Care) (Scotland) Amendment Regulations 2011 (S.S.I. 2011 No. 230)
- The Proceeds of Crime Act 2002 Amendment (Scotland) Order 2011 (S.S.I. 2011 No. 231)
- The Public Services Reform (Agricultural Holdings) (Scotland) Order 2011 (S.S.I. 2011 No. 232)
- The Equality Act 2010 (Specification of Public Authorities) (Scotland) Order 2011 (S.S.I. 2011 No. 233)
- The Cross-Border Mediation (Scotland) Regulations 2011 (S.S.I. 2011 No. 234)
- The Legal Profession and Legal Aid (Scotland) Act 2007 (Modification and Consequential Provisions) Order 2011 (S.S.I. 2011 No. 235)
- The Public Appointments and Public Bodies etc. (Scotland) Act 2003 (Amendment of Specified Authorities) (No. 2) Order 2011 (S.S.I. 2011 No. 236)
- The Scottish Charitable Incorporated Organisations (Removal from Register and Dissolution) Regulations 2011 (S.S.I. 2011 No. 237)
- The Debt Arrangement Scheme (Interest, Fees, Penalties and Other Charges) (Scotland) Regulations 2011 (S.S.I. 2011 No. 238)
- The Housing Support Grant (Scotland) Order 2011 (S.S.I. 2011 No. 239)
- The A92 Trunk Road (Station Brae and Inverdovat Junctions) (Prohibition of Specified Turns) Order 2011 (S.S.I. 2011 No. 240)
- The A828 Trunk Road (Connel to Salachan Glen Cycle Track) (Redetermination of Means of Exercise of Public Right of Passage) Order 2011 (S.S.I. 2011 No. 241)
- Act of Adjournal (Criminal Procedure Rules Amendment No. 4) (Disclosure) 2011 (S.S.I. 2011 No. 242)
- The A90 Trunk Road (Ferrytoll Junction) (Special Event) (Temporary Prohibition of Traffic)Order 2011 (S.S.I. 2011 No. 243)
- The Scottish Parliamentary Pensions Act 2009 (Modifications to the Scottish Parliamentary Pensions Scheme) Resolution 2011 (S.S.I. 2011 No. 244)
- The M80/A80 Trunk Road (Dennyloanhead to Mollinsburn) (Temporary Width Restriction on Vehicles) Order 2011 (S.S.I. 2011 No. 245)
- The M8 Motorway(Junction 20, West Street, to Junction 24, Helen Street) (Temporary 50 mph Speed Limit) Revocation Order 2011 (S.S.I. 2011 No. 246)
- The South West Unit Trunk Roads Area (Temporary Prohibitions of Traffic, Temporary Prohibitions of Overtaking and Temporary Speed Restrictions) (No.4) Order 2011 (S.S.I. 2011 No. 247)
- The South East Unit Trunk Roads Area (Temporary Prohibitions of Traffic, Temporary Prohibitions of Overtaking and Temporary Speed Restrictions) (No.4) Order 2011 (S.S.I. 2011 No. 248)
- The North West Unit Trunk Roads Area (Temporary Prohibitions of Traffic, Temporary Prohibitions of Overtaking and Temporary Speed Restrictions) (No.4) Order 2011 (S.S.I. 2011 No. 249)
- The North East Unit Trunk Roads Area (Temporary Prohibitions of Traffic, Temporary Prohibitions of Overtaking and Temporary Speed Restrictions) (No. 4) Order 2011 (S.S.I. 2011 No. 250)
- The A80 Trunk Road (Castlecary Interchange) (Temporary Prohibition of Specified Turns and Bus Lanes) Order 2011 (S.S.I. 2011 No. 251)
- The South East Unit Trunk Roads Area (Temporary Prohibitions of Traffic, Temporary Prohibitions of Overtaking and Temporary Speed Restrictions) (No.5) Order 2011 (S.S.I. 2011 No. 252)
- The South West Unit Trunk Roads Area (Temporary Prohibitions of Traffic, Temporary Prohibitions of Overtaking and Temporary Speed Restrictions) (No.5) Order 2011 (S.S.I. 2011 No. 253)
- The North East Unit Trunk Roads Area (Temporary Prohibitions of Traffic, Temporary Prohibitions of Overtaking and Temporary Speed Restrictions) (No. 5) Order 2011 (S.S.I. 2011 No. 254)
- The North West Unit Trunk Roads Area (Temporary Prohibitions of Traffic, Temporary Prohibitions of Overtaking and Temporary Speed Restrictions) (No.5) Order 2011 (S.S.I. 2011 No. 255)
- The A1 (Spott Roundabout to Skateraw Railway Overbridge) (Temporary Prohibition of Specified Turns) Order 2011 (S.S.I. 2011 No. 256)
- The A90 Trunk Road (Laurencekirk North Junction Improvements) Order 2011 (S.S.I. 2011 No. 257)
- The A90 Trunk Road (Laurencekirk North Junction Improvements) (Side Roads) Order 2011 (S.S.I. 2011 No. 258)
- The Aquatic Animal Health (Scotland) Amendment Regulations 2011 (S.S.I. 2011 No. 259)
- The Rural Development Support Measures (Control Procedures and Miscellaneous Amendments) (Scotland) Regulations 2011 (S.S.I. 2011 No. 260)
- The Education Maintenance Allowances (Scotland) Amendment Regulations 2011 (S.S.I. 2011 No. 261)
- The Crofting Counties Agricultural Grants (Scotland) Amendment Scheme 2011 (S.S.I. 2011 No. 262)
- The Knife Dealer's Licence (Historical Re-enactment Events) (Scotland) Order 2011 (S.S.I. 2011 No. 263)
- The Local Governance (Scotland) Act 2004 (Remuneration) Amendment Regulations 2011 (S.S.I. 2011 No. 264)
- The National Health Service Central Register (Scotland) Amendment Regulations 2011 (S.S.I. 2011 No. 265)
- The M80/A80 Trunk Road (Hornshill to Haggs) (Temporary Prohibition of Traffic) Order 2011 (S.S.I. 2011 No. 266)
- The A83 Trunk Road (Poltalloch Street, Lochgilphead) (Special Event) (Temporary Prohibition of Traffic) Order 2011 (S.S.I. 2011 No. 267)
- The Damages (Scotland) Act 2011 (Commencement, Transitional Provisions and Savings) Order 2011 (S.S.I. 2011 No. 268 (C. 20))
- The Local Democracy, Economic Development and Construction Act 2009 (Commencement No. 1) (Scotland) Order 2011 (S.S.I. 2011 No. 269 (C. 21))
- The Private Rented Housing (Scotland) Act 2011 (Commencement No. 1 and Saving Provision) Order 2011 (S.S.I. 2011 No. 270 (C. 22))
- The North East Unit Trunk Roads Area (Temporary Prohibitions of Traffic, Temporary Prohibitions of Overtaking and Temporary Speed Restrictions) (No. 6) Order 2011 (S.S.I. 2011 No. 271)
- The North West Unit Trunk Roads Area (Temporary Prohibitions of Traffic, Temporary Prohibitions of Overtaking and Temporary Speed Restrictions) (No. 6) Order 2011 (S.S.I. 2011 No. 272)
- The South East Unit Trunk Roads Area (Temporary Prohibitions of Traffic, Temporary Prohibitions of Overtaking and Temporary Speed Restrictions) (No.6) Order 2011 (S.S.I. 2011 No. 273)
- The South West Unit Trunk Roads Area (Temporary Prohibitions of Traffic, Temporary Prohibitions of Overtaking and Temporary Speed Restrictions) (No.6) Order 2011 (S.S.I. 2011 No. 274)
- The M74 Motorway (Fullarton Road to the M8 Motorway West of Kingston Bridge) (Temporary Speed Restriction) Order 2011 (S.S.I. 2011 No. 275)
- The A96 Trunk Road (Scottish Open Golf, Castle Stuart) (Temporary 30 mph Speed Restriction) Order 2011 (S.S.I. 2011 No. 276)
- The Local Electoral Administration (Scotland) Act 2011 (Commencement) Order 2011 (S.S.I. 2011 No. 277 (C. 23))
- The Public Services Reform (Scotland) Act 2010 (Commencement No. 5) Order 2011 (S.S.I. 2011 No. 278 (C. 24))
- The Wildlife and Natural Environment (Scotland) Act 2011 (Commencement No. 1) Order 2011 (S.S.I. 2011 No. 279 (C. 25))
- The A85 (Main Street, Methven) (Temporary Prohibition of Waiting, Loading and Unloading) Order 2011 (S.S.I. 2011 No. 280)
- The M9/A90/M90 Trunk Road (Gairneybridge to Milnathort) (Temporary 50 mph and 30 mph Speed Limits) Order 2011 (S.S.I. 2011 No. 281)
- The Plastic Kitchenware (Conditions on Imports from China) (Scotland) Regulations 2011 (S.S.I. 2011 No. 282)
- The Caledonian Maritime Assets (Port Ellen) Harbour Revision Order 2011 (S.S.I. 2011 No. 283)
- The Scrabster (Deep Inner Berth) Harbour Revision Order 2011 (S.S.I. 2011 No. 284)
- The Pollution Prevention and Control (Scotland) Amendment Regulations 2011 (S.S.I. 2011 No. 285)
- The A96 Trunk Road (Old Barn Church Road, Culloden to Smithton Roundabout) (Temporary Prohibition of Specified Turns) Order 2011 (S.S.I. 2011 No. 286)
- The Wildlife and Natural Environment (Scotland) Act 2011 (Commencement No. 1) Amendment Order 2011 (S.S.I. 2011 No. 287 (C. 26))
- Act of Sederunt (Rules of the Court of Session Amendment No. 4) (Miscellaneous) 2011 (S.S.I. 2011 No. 288)
- Act of Sederunt (Sheriff Court Rules) (Miscellaneous Amendments) (No. 2) 2011 (S.S.I. 2011 No. 289)
- Act of Adjournal (Criminal Procedure Rules Amendment No.5) (Miscellaneous) 2011 (S.S.I. 2011 No. 290)
- The Local Democracy, Economic Development and Construction Act 2009 (Commencement No. 2) (Scotland) Order 2011 (S.S.I. 2011 No. 291 (C. 27))
- The M8/A8 and A78 Trunk Roads (Temporary Prohibition of Traffic, Temporary Prohibitions of Specified Turns, Temporary Prohibitions of Waiting and Loading and Temporary Speed Restriction) Order 2011 (S.S.I. 2011 No. 292)
- The A835/A893 Trunk Road (Shore Street, Ullapool) (Special Event) (Temporary Prohibition of Traffic) Order 2011 (S.S.I. 2011 No. 293)
- The A68 Trunk Road (St Boswells) (30 mph and 40 mph Speed Limit) Order 2011 (S.S.I. 2011 No. 294)
- The A84 Trunk Road (Callander Gala Day, Callander) (Temporary 30 mph Speed Restriction) Order 2011 (S.S.I. 2011 No. 295)
- The North East Unit Trunk Roads Area (Temporary Prohibitions of Traffic, Temporary Prohibitions of Overtaking and Temporary Speed Restrictions) (No. 7) Order 2011 (S.S.I. 2011 No. 296)
- The North West Unit Trunk Roads Area (Temporary Prohibitions of Traffic, Temporary Prohibitions of Overtaking and Temporary Speed Restrictions) (No.7) Order 2011 (S.S.I. 2011 No. 297)
- The South East Unit Trunk Roads Area (Temporary Prohibitions of Traffic, Temporary Prohibitions of Overtaking and Temporary Speed Restrictions) (No.7) Order 2011 (S.S.I. 2011 No. 298)
- The South West Unit Trunk Roads Area (Temporary Prohibitions of Traffic, Temporary Prohibitions of Overtaking and Temporary Speed Restrictions) (No.7) Order 2011 (S.S.I. 2011 No. 299)
- The A7 Trunk Road (Townhead and High Street, Langholm) (Special Event) (Temporary Prohibition of Traffic) Order 2011 (S.S.I. 2011 No. 300)

== 301–400 ==
- The A720 Trunk Road (Lothianburn Junction to Dreghorn Junction) (Temporary 50 mph Speed Limit) Order 2011 (S.S.I. 2011 No. 301)
- The M80/A80 Trunk Road (Hornshill to Auchenkilns), M73 Trunk Road (Gartcosh to Mollinsburn) and Moodiesburn Bypass Trunk Road (Hornshill to Mollinsburn) (Temporary 40 mph Speed Restriction) Order 2011 (S.S.I. 2011 No. 302)
- Act of Sederunt (Rules of the Court of Session Amendment No. 5) (Causes in the Inner House) 2011 (S.S.I. 2011 No. 303)
- The Local Government (Allowances and Expenses) (Scotland) Amendment Regulations 2011 (S.S.I. 2011 No. 304)
- The Food Additives (Scotland) Amendment (No. 2) Regulations 2011 (S.S.I. 2011 No. 305)
- The Extraction Solvents in Food Amendment (Scotland) Regulations 2011 (S.S.I. 2011 No. 306)
- The South East Unit Trunk Roads Area (Temporary Prohibitions of Traffic, Temporary Prohibitions of Overtaking and Temporary Speed Restrictions) (No.8) Order 2011 (S.S.I. 2011 No. 307)
- The South West Unit Trunk Roads Area (Temporary Prohibitions of Traffic, Temporary Prohibitions of Overtaking and Temporary Speed Restrictions) (No.8) Order 2011 (S.S.I. 2011 No. 308)
- The North East Unit Trunk Roads Area (Temporary Prohibitions of Traffic, Temporary Prohibitions of Overtaking and Temporary Speed Restrictions) (No. 8) Order 2011 (S.S.I. 2011 No. 309)
- The North West Unit Trunk Roads Area (Temporary Prohibitions of Traffic, Temporary Prohibitions of Overtaking and Temporary Speed Restrictions) (No.8) Order 2011 (S.S.I. 2011 No. 310)
- The Plant Health (Import Inspection Fees) (Scotland) Amendment Regulations 2011 (S.S.I. 2011 No. 311)
- Act of Sederunt (Regulation of Advocates) 2011 (S.S.I. 2011 No. 312)
- The A76 Trunk Road (Closeburn) (40 mph Speed Limit) Order 2011 (S.S.I. 2011 No. 313)
- The M9/A90/M90 Trunk Road (Admiralty to Halbeath) (Temporary Prohibition of Traffic) Order 2011 (S.S.I. 2011 No. 314)
- The M9/A90/M90 Trunk Road (Admiralty to Halbeath), A823(M) Trunk Road (Masterton to Pitreavie), A92 Trunk Road (Halbeath to Cowdenbeath) (Temporary 40 mph Speed Restriction) Order 2011 (S.S.I. 2011 No. 315)
- The A96 Trunk Road (Mosstodloch Bypass) (Temporary Prohibition of Traffic, Temporary Prohibition of Overtaking, Temporary Prohibition of Waiting, Loading and Unloading and Temporary Speed Restriction) Order 2011 (S.S.I. 2011 No. 316)
- The A92 Trunk Road (Leuchars Airshow) (Temporary 30 mph Speed Restriction) Order 2011 (S.S.I. 2011 No. 317)
- The Poultrymeat (Scotland) Regulations 2011 (S.S.I. 2011 No. 318)
- The Inshore Fishing (Prohibition of Fishing for Cockles) (Solway Firth) (Scotland) Order 2011 (S.S.I. 2011 No. 319)
- The Curators ad Litem and Reporting Officers (Panels) and the Panels of Persons to Safeguard the Interests of Children (Scotland) Amendment Regulations 2011 (S.S.I. 2011 No. 320)
- The A7 Trunk Road (Selkirk Vintage Car Rally) (Special Event)(Temporary 30 mph Speed Limit) Order 2011 (S.S.I. 2011 No. 321)
- The A90/A92/A972 Trunk Roads (Forfar Road Junction, Dundee)(Temporary Prohibition of Specified Turns) Order 2011 (S.S.I. 2011 No. 322)
- The Road Traffic (Permitted Parking Area and Special Parking Area) (City of Edinburgh) Designation Amendment Order 2011 (S.S.I. 2011 No. 323)
- The Marketing of Horticultural Produce (Scotland) Amendment Regulations 2011 (S.S.I. 2011 No. 324)
- The Bananas (Enforcement of Quality Standards) (Scotland) Regulations 2011 (S.S.I. 2011 No. 325)
- The Bee Diseases and Pests Control (Scotland) Amendment Order 2011 (S.S.I. 2011 No. 326)
- The Pigs (Records, Identification and Movement) (Scotland) Order 2011 (S.S.I. 2011 No. 327)
- The Property Factors (Scotland) Act 2011 (Commencement No. 1) Order 2011 (S.S.I. 2011 No. 328 (C. 28))
- The A78 Trunk Road (Nelson Street/Newton Street) (Detrunking) Order 2011 (S.S.I. 2011 No. 329)
- The A876 Trunk Road (Clackmannanshire Bridge) (Temporary Prohibition of Traffic) Order 2011 (S.S.I. 2011 No. 330)
- The Prisons and Young Offenders Institutions (Scotland) Rules 2011 (S.S.I. 2011 No. 331)
- The West Lothian (Electoral Arrangements) Councillor Numbers Order 2011 (S.S.I. 2011 No. 332)
- The Criminal Legal Assistance (Fees) (Scotland) Regulations 2011 (S.S.I. 2011 No. 333)
- The Crofting Reform (Scotland) Act 2010 (Commencement No. 2, Transitory, Transitional and Saving Provisions) Order 2011 (S.S.I. 2011 No. 334 (C. 29))
- The A82 Trunk Road (Fort William) (Prohibition of Waiting) Order 2011 (S.S.I. 2011 No. 335)
- The Planning etc. (Scotland) Act 2006 (Development Planning) (Saving, Transitional and Consequential Provisions) Amendment Order 2011 (S.S.I. 2011 No. 336)
- The Local Democracy, Economic Development and Construction Act 2009 (Commencement No. 3) (Scotland) Order 2011 (S.S.I. 2011 No. 337 (C. 30))
- The Ullapool Harbour Revision (Constitution) Order 2011 (S.S.I. 2011 No. 338)
- The Housing (Scotland) Act 2010 (Commencement No. 4) Order 2011 (S.S.I. 2011 No. 339 (C. 31))
- The North West Unit Trunk Roads Area (Temporary Prohibitions of Traffic, Temporary Prohibitions of Overtaking and Temporary Speed Restrictions) (No.9) Order 2011 (S.S.I. 2011 No. 340)
- The North East Unit Trunk Roads Area (Temporary Prohibitions of Traffic, Temporary Prohibitions of Overtaking and Temporary Speed Restrictions) (No.9) Order 2011 (S.S.I. 2011 No. 341)
- The South West Unit Trunk Roads Area (Temporary Prohibitions of Traffic, Temporary Prohibitions of Overtaking and Temporary Speed Restrictions) (No.9) Order 2011 (S.S.I. 2011 No. 342)
- The South East Unit Trunk Roads Area (Temporary Prohibitions of Traffic, Temporary Prohibitions of Overtaking and Temporary Speed Restrictions) (No.9) Order 2011 (S.S.I. 2011 No. 343)
- The A96 Trunk Road (Ashgrove Road, Elgin) (Temporary Prohibition of Specified Turns) Order 2011 (S.S.I. 2011 No. 344)
- The A1 Trunk Road (Spott Roundabout - Unnamed Road at Innerwick Junction) (Temporary Prohibition of Specified Turns) Order 2011 (S.S.I. 2011 No. 345)
- The M8 Motorway (Junction 21, Seaward Street) (Temporary Width Restriction) Order 2011 (S.S.I. 2011 No. 346)
- The Caledonian Maritime Assets (Kennacraig) Harbour Revision Order 2011 (S.S.I. 2011 No. 347)
- The Planning etc. (Scotland) Act 2006 (Saving and Transitional Provisions) Amendment Order 2011 (S.S.I. 2011 No. 348)
- The Local Government Pension Scheme (Miscellaneous Amendments) (Scotland) Regulations 2011 (S.S.I. 2011 No. 349)
- The Home Energy Assistance Scheme (Scotland) Amendment (No. 2) Regulations 2011 (S.S.I. 2011 No. 350)
- The Pigs (Records, Identification and Movement) (Scotland) Amendment Order 2011 (S.S.I. 2011 No. 351)
- The Forced Marriage etc. (Protection and Jurisdiction) (Scotland) Act 2011 (Commencement) Order 2011 (S.S.I. 2011 No. 352 (C. 32))
- Climate Change (Annual Targets) (Scotland) Order 2011 (SSI 2011/353)
- The Criminal Justice and Licensing (Scotland) Act 2010 (Commencement No. 9, Transitional and Savings Provisions) Order 2011 (S.S.I. 2011 No. 354 (C. 33))
- Act of Adjournal (Criminal Procedure Rules Amendment No.6) (Sexual Offences Prevention Order) 2011 (S.S.I. 2011 No. 355)
- The Prisons and Young Offenders Institutions (Scotland) Amendment Rules 2011 (S.S.I. 2011 No. 356)
- The Town and Country Planning (General Permitted Development) (Scotland) Amendment Order 2011 (S.S.I. 2011 No. 357)
- The North East Unit Trunk Roads Area (Temporary Prohibitions of Traffic, Temporary Prohibitions of Overtaking and Temporary Speed Restrictions) (No. 10) Order 2011 (S.S.I. 2011 No. 358)
- The North West Unit Trunk Roads Area (Temporary Prohibitions of Traffic, Temporary Prohibitions of Overtaking and Temporary Speed Restrictions) (No. 10) Order 2011 (S.S.I. 2011 No. 359)
- The South East Unit Trunk Roads Area (Temporary Prohibitions of Traffic, Temporary Prohibitions of Overtaking and Temporary Speed Restrictions) (No. 10) Order 2011 (S.S.I. 2011 No. 360)
- The South West Unit Trunk Roads Area (Temporary Prohibitions of Traffic, Temporary Prohibitions of Overtaking and Temporary Speed Restrictions) (No. 10) Order 2011 (S.S.I. 2011 No. 361)
- The M9/A90/M90 Trunk Road (Kirkliston to Scotstoun) and M9/A9 Trunk Road (Newbridge to Winchburgh) Temporary Prohibition of Traffic Order 2011 (S.S.I. 2011 No. 362)
- The M9/A90/M90 Trunk Road (Kirkliston to Queensferry), M9/A9 Trunk Road (Newbridge to Winchburgh) and M8/A8 Trunk Road (Claylands M8 Spur to Newbridge) Temporary 40 mph Speed Restriction Order 2011 (S.S.I. 2011 No. 363)
- The National Health Service Superannuation Scheme etc. (Miscellaneous Amendments) (Scotland) Regulations 2011 (S.S.I. 2011 No. 364)
- The Double Jeopardy (Scotland) Act 2011 (Commencement and Transitional Provisions) Order 2011 (S.S.I. 2011 No. 365 (C. 34))
- The Criminal Justice and Licensing (Scotland) Act 2010 (Commencement No. 9, Transitional and Savings Provisions) Amendment Order 2011 (S.S.I. 2011 No. 366)
- The Highlands and Islands Air Services (Scotland) Act 1980 Amendment Regulations 2011 (S.S.I. 2011 No. 367)
- The Water Environment (Relevant Enactments and Designation of Responsible Authorities and Functions) (Scotland) Order 2011 (S.S.I. 2011 No. 368)
- The Public Services Reform (Scotland) Act 2010 (Consequential Modifications) (No. 2) Order 2011 (S.S.I. 2011 No. 369)
- The Construction Contracts (Scotland) Exclusion Order 2011 (S.S.I. 2011 No. 370)
- The Scheme for Construction Contracts (Scotland) Amendment Regulations 2011 (S.S.I. 2011 No. 371)
- The Historic Environment (Amendment) (Scotland) Act 2011 (Commencement No. 2) Order 2011 (S.S.I. 2011 No. 372 (C. 35))
- The Ancient Monuments and Archaeological Areas (Compensation) (Scotland) Regulations 2011 (S.S.I. 2011 No. 373)
- The Planning (Listed Buildings) (Prescribed Form of Notices) (Scotland) Regulations 2011 (S.S.I. 2011 No. 374)
- The Ancient Monuments and Archaeological Areas (Applications for Scheduled Monument Consent) (Scotland) Regulations 2011 (S.S.I. 2011 No. 375)
- The Town and Country Planning (Listed Buildings and Buildings in Conservation Areas) (Scotland) Amendment Regulations 2011 (S.S.I. 2011 No. 376)
- The Historic Environment (Amendment) (Scotland) Act 2011 (Saving, Transitional and Consequential Provisions) Order 2011 (S.S.I. 2011 No. 377)
- The Town and Country Planning (Appeals) (Scotland) Amendment Regulations 2011 (S.S.I. 2011 No. 378)
- The Town and Country Planning (Inquiries Procedure) (Scotland) Amendment Rules 2011 (S.S.I. 2011 No. 379)
- The Town and Country Planning (Appeals) (Written Submissions Procedure) (Scotland) Revocation Regulations 2011 (S.S.I. 2011 No. 380)
- The Planning etc. (Scotland) Act 2006 (Listed Buildings) (Saving Provisions) Order 2011 (S.S.I. 2011 No. 381)
- The Planning etc. (Scotland) Act 2006 (Commencement No. 12) Order 2011 (S.S.I. 2011 No. 382 (C. 36))
- The Town and Country Planning (Enforcement of Control) (No. 2) (Scotland) Amendment Regulations 2011 (S.S.I. 2011 No. 383)
- The A82 Trunk Road (Ba Bridge, Rannoch Moor) (Temporary Prohibition of Traffic) Order 2011 (S.S.I. 2011 No. 384)
- Act of Sederunt (Rules of the Court of Session Amendment No. 6) (Miscellaneous) 2011 (S.S.I. 2011 No. 385)
- Act of Sederunt (Sheriff Court Rules) (Miscellaneous Amendments) (No. 3) 2011 (S.S.I. 2011 No. 386)
- Act of Adjournal (Criminal Procedure Rules Amendment No.7) (Double Jeopardy (Scotland) Act 2011) 2011 (S.S.I. 2011 No. 387)
- Act of Sederunt (Contempt of Court in Civil Proceedings) 2011 (S.S.I. 2011 No. 388)
- The Education (Fees) (Scotland) Regulations 2011 (S.S.I. 2011 No. 389)
- The Enzootic Bovine Leukosis (Scotland) Amendment Regulations 2011 (S.S.I. 2011 No. 390)
- The A96 Trunk Road (Church Road, Keith) (Special Event) (Temporary Prohibition of Traffic) Order 2011 (S.S.I. 2011 No. 391)
- The National Health Service (Primary Medical Services Performers Lists) (Scotland) Amendment Regulations 2011 (S.S.I. 2011 No. 392)
- The Spring Traps Approval (Scotland) Order 2011 (S.S.I. 2011 No. 393)
- The Removal, Storage and Disposal of Vehicles (Prescribed Sums and Charges etc.) (Scotland) Regulations 2011 (S.S.I. 2011 No. 394)
- The Police (Retention and Disposal of Motor Vehicles) (Scotland) Amendment Regulations 2011 (S.S.I. 2011 No. 395)
- The Interpretation and Legislative Reform (Scotland) Act 2010 (Consequential, Savings and Transitional Provisions) Order 2011 (S.S.I. 2011 No. 396)
- The A823(M) Trunk Road (Pitreavie to Masterton) and M9/A90/M90 Trunk Road (Masterton to Halbeath and Admiralty Interchange) Temporary Prohibition of Traffic Order 2011 (S.S.I. 2011 No. 397)
- The A82 Trunk Road (Glen Righ) (Temporary Prohibition of Traffic, Temporary Prohibition of Overtaking and Temporary 40 mph Speed Restriction) Order 2011 (S.S.I. 2011 No. 398)
- The Scottish Local Government Elections Order 2011 (S.S.I. 2011 No. 399)
- Act of Sederunt (Lands Valuation Appeal Court) 2011 (S.S.I. 2011 No. 400)

== 401–458 ==
- The Licensing and Regulation of Taxis (Appeals in Respect of Taxi Fares) (Scotland) Amendment Order 2011 (S.S.I. 2011 No. 401)
- Act of Sederunt (Rules of the Court of Session Amendment No. 7) (Taxation of Accounts and Fees of Solicitors) 2011 (S.S.I. 2011 No. 402)
- Act of Sederunt (Fees of Solicitors and Witnesses in the Sheriff Court) (Amendment) 2011 (S.S.I. 2011 No. 403)
- Act of Sederunt (Sanction for the Employment of Counsel in the Sheriff Court) 2011 (S.S.I. 2011 No. 404)
- The Administrative Justice and Tribunals Council (Listed Tribunals) (Scotland) Amendment Order 2011 (S.S.I. 2011 No. 405)
- The South East Unit Trunk Roads Area (Temporary Prohibitions of Traffic, Temporary Prohibitions of Overtaking and Temporary Speed Restrictions) (No. 11) Order 2011 (S.S.I. 2011 No. 406)
- The South West Unit Trunk Roads Area (Temporary Prohibitions of Traffic, Temporary Prohibitions of Overtaking and Temporary Speed Restrictions) (No.11) Order 2011 (S.S.I. 2011 No. 407)
- The North East Unit Trunk Roads Area (Temporary Prohibitions of Traffic, Temporary Prohibitions of Overtaking and Temporary Speed Restrictions) (No. 11) Order 2011 (S.S.I. 2011 No. 408)
- The North West Unit Trunk Roads Area (Temporary Prohibitions of Traffic, Temporary Prohibitions of Overtaking and Temporary Speed Restrictions) (No. 11) Order 2011 (S.S.I. 2011 No. 409)
- The Disabled Persons (Badges for Motor Vehicles) (Scotland) Amendment (No. 2) Regulations 2011 (S.S.I. 2011 No. 410)
- The Protection of Vulnerable Groups (Scotland) Act 2007 (Prescribed Purposes for Consideration of Suitability) Regulations 2011 (S.S.I. 2011 No. 411)
- The Cattle Identification (Scotland) Amendment Regulations 2011 (S.S.I. 2011 No. 412)
- The Seed (Fees) (Scotland) Regulations 2011 (S.S.I. 2011 No. 413)
- The Seed Potatoes (Fees) (Scotland) Amendment Regulations 2011 (S.S.I. 2011 No. 414)
- The Common Agricultural Policy Schemes (Cross-Compliance) (Scotland) Regulations 2011 (S.S.I. 2011 No. 415)
- The Common Agricultural Policy Single Farm Payment and Support Schemes (Scotland) Regulations 2011 (S.S.I. 2011 No. 416)
- The Deer (Close Seasons) (Scotland) Order 2011 (S.S.I. 2011 No. 417)
- The Control of Volatile Organic Compounds (Petrol Vapour Recovery) (Scotland) Regulations 2011 (S.S.I. 2011 No. 418)
- The Nature Conservation (Scotland) Act 2004 (Authorised Operations) Order 2011 (S.S.I. 2011 No. 419)
- The A96 Aberdeen - Inverness Trunk Road (Fochabers and Mosstodloch Bypass) (40 mph Speed Limit) Order 2011 (S.S.I. 2011 No. 420)
- The A77 Trunk Road (Dalrymple Street, Girvan) (Special Event) (Temporary Prohibition of Traffic) Order 2011 (S.S.I. 2011 No. 421)
- The Campbeltown Harbour Revision Order 2011 (S.S.I. 2011 No. 422)
- The Pollution Prevention and Control (Designation of Industrial Emissions Directive) (Scotland) Order 2011 (S.S.I. 2011 No. 423)
- The Planning (Listed Buildings) (Amount of Fixed Penalty) (Scotland) Regulations 2011 (S.S.I. 2011 No. 424)
- The M9/A90/M90 Trunk Road (Potterton and Belhelvie Junctions (Temporary Prohibition of Specified Turns) Order 2011 (S.S.I. 2011 No. 425)
- The A6091 Trunk Road (Borders General Hospital Junction) (Prohibition of Specified Turns) Order 2011 (S.S.I. 2011 No. 426)
- The Aquatic Animal Health (Miscellaneous Modifications) (Scotland) Regulations 2011 (S.S.I. 2011 No. 427)
- The Removal, Storage and Disposal of Vehicles (Prescribed Sums and Charges etc.) (Scotland) Revocation Regulations 2011 (S.S.I. 2011 No. 428)
- The Police (Retention and Disposal of Motor Vehicles) (Scotland) Amendment Revocation Regulations 2011 (S.S.I. 2011 No. 429)
- Act of Adjournal (Amendment of the Criminal Procedure (Scotland) Act 1995) (Refixing diets) 2011 (S.S.I. 2011 No. 430)
- Act of Sederunt (Fees of Messengers-at-Arms) (No. 2) 2011 (S.S.I. 2011 No. 431)
- Act of Sederunt (Fees of Sheriff Officers) (No. 2) 2011 (S.S.I. 2011 No. 432)
- The Wildlife and Natural Environment (Scotland) Act 2011 (Commencement No. 2) Order 2011 (S.S.I. 2011 No. 433 (C. 37))
- The Budget (Scotland) Act 2011 Amendment Order 2011 (S.S.I. 2011 No. 434)
- The Confirmation to Small Estates (Scotland) Order 2011 (S.S.I. 2011 No. 435)
- The Prior Rights of Surviving Spouse and Civil Partner (Scotland) Order 2011 (S.S.I. 2011 No. 436)
- The Wildlife and Natural Environment (Scotland) Act 2011 (Commencement No. 2) Amendment Order 2011 (S.S.I. 2011 No. 437 (C. 38))
- The M9/A90/M90 Trunk Road (North Queensferry to Inverkeithing) Temporary 40 mph Speed Restriction Order 2011 (S.S.I. 2011 No. 438)
- The Fife Area Trunk Roads (M9/A90/M90, A985, A823(M) and A92) Temporary Regulation and Prohibitions of Traffic and Pedestrians Order 2011 (S.S.I. 2011 No. 439)
- Climate Change (Limit on Carbon Units) (Scotland) Order 2011 (SSI 2011/440)
- Act of Sederunt (Rules of the Court of Session Amendment No. 8) (Terrorism Prevention and Investigation Measures) 2011 (S.S.I. 2011 No. 441)
- The Bus Lane Contraventions (Charges, Adjudication and Enforcement) (Scotland) Regulations 2011 (S.S.I. 2011 No. 442)
- The Bus Lane Contraventions (Approved Local Authorities) (Scotland) Order 2011 (S.S.I. 2011 No. 443)
- The Bus Lanes (Approved Devices) (Scotland) Order 2011 (S.S.I. 2011 No. 444)
- The Housing (Scotland) Act 2010 (Consequential Amendment) Order 2011 (S.S.I. 2011 No. 445)
- The Charities References in Documents (Scotland) Amendment Regulations 2011 (S.S.I. 2011 No. 446)
- The Fraserburgh Harbour Revision Order 2011 (S.S.I. 2011 No. 447)
- The M9/A90/M90 Trunk Road (Laurencekirk) (Temporary Prohibition of Specified Turns) Order 2011 (S.S.I. 2011 No. 448)
- The National Health Service (Travelling Expenses and Remission of Charges) (Scotland) (No. 2) Amendment Regulations 2011 (S.S.I. 2011 No. 449)
- The South East Unit Trunk Roads Area (Temporary Prohibitions of Traffic, Temporary Prohibitions of Overtaking and Temporary Speed Restrictions) (No.12) Order 2011 (S.S.I. 2011 No. 450)
- The South West Unit Trunk Roads Area (Temporary Prohibitions of Traffic, Temporary Prohibitions of Overtaking and Temporary Speed Restrictions) (No.12) Order 2011 (S.S.I. 2011 No. 451)
- The North East Unit Trunk Roads Area (Temporary Prohibitions of Traffic, Temporary Prohibitions of Overtaking and Temporary Speed Restrictions) (No.12) Order 2011 (S.S.I. 2011 No. 452)
- The North West Unit Trunk Roads Area (Temporary Prohibitions of Traffic, Temporary Prohibitions of Overtaking and Temporary Speed Restrictions) (No.12) Order 2011 (S.S.I. 2011 No. 453)
- The A9 Trunk Road (Inshes Junction) (Temporary Prohibitions and Restrictions of Traffic) Order 2011 (S.S.I. 2011 No. 454)
- The Student Fees (Specification) (Scotland) Order 2011 (S.S.I. 2011 No. 455)
- The Crofting Commission (Elections) (Scotland) Regulations 2011 (S.S.I. 2011 No. 456)
- The Storage of Carbon Dioxide (Licensing etc.) (Scotland) Amendment Regulations 2011 (S.S.I. 2011 No. 457)
- The London Olympic Games and Paralympic Games (Advertising and Trading) (Scotland) Regulations 2011 (S.S.I. 2011 No. 458)
