= United Nations Convention on the Rights of the Child (Incorporation) (Scotland) Act 2024 =

Act of the Scottish Parliament

United Nations Convention on the Rights of the Child (Incorporation) (Scotland) Act 2024 (Note: Section 48.)
- Act of the Scottish Parliament
- Scottish Parliament
- Long title: An Act of the Scottish Parliament to incorporate in Scots law rights and obligations set out in the United Nations Convention on the Rights of the Child; to make related provision to ensure compliance with duties relating to the Convention; and for connected purposes.
- Citation: 2024 asp 1
- Territorial extent: Scotland

Dates
- Royal assent: 16 January 2024
- Commencement: various (Note: Section 47.)

Other legislation
- Amends: Court of Session Act 1988; Criminal Procedure (Scotland) Act 1995; Scottish Commission for Human Rights Act 2006
- Amended by: Children (Care and Justice) (Scotland) Act 2024

Status: Amended

History of passage through the Parliament

Text of statute as originally enacted

Revised text of statute as amended

Text of the United Nations Convention on the Rights of the Child (Incorporation) (Scotland) Act 2024 as in force today (including any amendments) within the United Kingdom, from legislation.gov.uk.

The United Nations Convention on the Rights of the Child (Incorporation) (Scotland) Act 2024 (asp 1) is an act of the Scottish Parliament that established several provisions with regard Scottish Parliament complying with the United Nations Convention on the Rights of the Child.

== Provisions ==
The act places a duty on Scottish Ministers to comply with the UN Convention, and a duty to promote the convention.

The Scottish Government must now consult the Children and Young People's Commissioner Scotland, the Scottish Human Rights Commission.

Asylum and migration policy is also not devolved, is also not devolved so the Act also does not apply to policies regarding unaccompanied minors.

The act also makes provisions for a children's rights scheme to ensure compliance with the convention.

== History ==
In 2008, the four children's commissioners of the UK recommended incorporating the Convention into domestic law.

In March 2021, the Scottish Parliament passed the United Nations Convention on the Rights of the Child (Incorporation) (Scotland) Bill partially incorporating the Convention into domestic law. It only applied to devolved matters. However, in October 2021 the UK Supreme Court held that central provisions of the bill were outside the authority of the Scottish Parliament. In December 2023, the Scottish Parliament reconsidered the Bill, amended it to address the Supreme Court's ruling and passed it 117-0 and it received royal assent on 16 January 2024, meaning it came into force on 16 July 2024.

In 2024, the Scottish Government announced plans to set up the Children's Rights Scheme to provide the mechanism to ensure that the Scottish Government complies with the convention.

== See also ==
- Children Act 1989
- Human Rights Act 1998
- European Convention on Human Rights
- United Nations Convention on the Rights of the Child
- Children and Young People's Commissioner Scotland
