= List of Scottish statutory instruments, 2009 =

This is a complete list of Scottish statutory instruments in 2009.

== 1-100 ==
- The Rural Development Contracts (Rural Priorities) (Scotland) Amendment Regulations 2009 (S.S.I. 2009 No. 1)
- The Local Electoral Administration and Registration Services (Scotland) Act 2006 (Commencement No. 5 and Transitional Provision) Order 2009 (S.S.I. 2009 No. 2 (C. 1))
- The Non-Domestic Rate (Scotland) Order 2009 (S.S.I. 2009 No. 3)
- The Protection of Vulnerable Groups (Scotland) Act 2007 (Transitory Provisions in Consequence of the Safeguarding Vulnerable Groups Act 2006) Order 2009 (S.S.I. 2009 No. 4)
- The Scottish Register of Tartans Act 2008 (Commencement) Order 2009 (S.S.I. 2009 No. 5 (C. 2))
- The Scottish Register of Tartans Fees Order 2009 (S.S.I. 2009 No. 6)
- The Animal By-Products (Scotland) Amendment Regulations 2009 (S.S.I. 2009 No. 7)
- The Plant Health (Import Inspection Fees) (Scotland) Amendment Regulations 2009 (S.S.I. 2009 No. 8)
- The Public Health etc. (Scotland) Act 2008 (Commencement No. 1) Order 2009 (S.S.I. 2009 No. 9 (C. 3))
- The M8 (Junction 4a at Whitburn Connecting Roads) Special Road Scheme 2009 (S.S.I. 2009 No. 10)
- The M8 (Junction 4a at Whitburn Connecting Roads) Side Roads Order 2009 (S.S.I. 2009 No. 11)
- Act of Sederunt (Registration Appeal Court) 2009 (S.S.I. 2009 No. 12)
- The A92/A972 Trunk Road (Central Reserve Crossing Kingsway East, Dundee) (Prohibition of Specified Turns) Order 2009 (S.S.I. 2009 No. 13)
- The A76 Trunk Road (Glenairlie Improvement) (50 mph Speed Limit) Order 2009 (S.S.I. 2009 No. 14)
- The M90/A90 Inverkeithing–Fraserburgh Trunk Road (North Anderson Drive, Aberdeen) (Prohibition of Specified Turns) Order 2009 (S.S.I. 2009 No. 15)
- The M8 Motorway (White Cart Viaduct) (Temporary 40 mph Speed Limit) Order 2009 (S.S.I. 2009 No. 16)
- The Legal Profession and Legal Aid (Scotland) Act 2007 (Transitional Provision) Order 2009 (S.S.I. 2009 No. 17)
- The Planning etc. (Scotland) Act 2006 (Development Planning) (Saving, Transitional and Consequential Provisions) Amendment Order 2009 (S.S.I. 2009 No. 18)
- The National Health Service (Superannuation Scheme, Pension Scheme and Injury Benefits) (Scotland) Amendment Regulations 2009 (S.S.I. 2009 No. 19)
- The Justice of the Peace Courts (Sheriffdom of Tayside, Central and Fife) Amendment Order 2009 (S.S.I. 2009 No. 20)
- The Feeding Stuffs (Scotland) Amendment Regulations 2009 (S.S.I. 2009 No. 21)
- The South West Unit Trunk Roads Area (Temporary Prohibitions of Traffic, Temporary Prohibitions of Overtaking and Temporary Speed Restrictions) Order 2009 (S.S.I. 2009 No. 22)
- The South East Unit Trunk Roads Area (Temporary Prohibitions of Traffic, Temporary Prohibitions of Overtaking and Temporary Speed Restrictions) Order 2009 (S.S.I. 2009 No. 23)
- The North West Unit Trunk Roads Area (Temporary Prohibitions of Traffic, Temporary Prohibitions of Overtaking and Temporary Speed Restrictions) Order 2009 (S.S.I. 2009 No. 24)
- The North East Unit Trunk Roads Area (Temporary Prohibitions of Traffic, Temporary Prohibitions of Overtaking and Temporary Speed Restrictions) Order 2009 (S.S.I. 2009 No. 25)
- The Scottish Road Works Register (Prescribed Fees) Regulations 2009 (S.S.I. 2009 No. 26)
- The Port Babcock Rosyth Harbour Empowerment Order 2009 (S.S.I. 2009 No. 27)
- The Further and Higher Education (Scotland) Act 1992 Modification Order 2009 (S.S.I. 2009 No. 28)
- Act of Sederunt (Child Care and Maintenance Rules) Amendment 2009 (S.S.I. 2009 No. 29)
- The Plastic Materials and Articles in Contact with Food (Scotland) Regulations 2009 (S.S.I. 2009 No. 30)
- The Victim Statements (Prescribed Offences) (Scotland) Order 2009 (S.S.I. 2009 No. 31)
- The Regulation of Care (Miscellaneous Amendments) (Scotland) Regulations 2009 (S.S.I. 2009 No. 32)
- The Private Landlord Registration (Modification) (Scotland) Order 2009 (S.S.I. 2009 No. 33)
- The Town and Country Planning (General Permitted Development) (Domestic Microgeneration) (Scotland) Amendment Order 2009 (S.S.I. 2009 No. 34)
- The Absent Voting at Scottish Local Government Elections (Provision of Personal Identifiers) Regulations 2009 (S.S.I. 2009 No. 35)
- The Scottish Local Government Elections Amendment Order 2009 (S.S.I. 2009 No. 36)
- The National Health Service (Charges for Drugs and Appliances) (Scotland) Amendment Regulations 2009 (S.S.I. 2009 No. 37)
- The Sea Fish (Prohibited Methods of Fishing) (Firth of Clyde) Order 2009 (S.S.I. 2009 No. 38)
- The Protection of Children (Scotland) Act 2003 (The Meaning of Disqualified from Working with Children: Corresponding Disqualifications in Northern Ireland) Order 2009 (S.S.I. 2009 No. 39)
- The Police Act 1997 (Criminal Records) (Scotland) Amendment Regulations 2009 (S.S.I. 2009 No. 40)
- The Police Grant (Variation) (Scotland) Order 2009 (S.S.I. 2009 No. 41)
- The Non-Domestic Rates (Levying) (Scotland) Regulations 2009 (S.S.I. 2009 No. 42)
- The Housing Revenue Account General Fund Contribution Limits (Scotland) Order 2009 (S.S.I. 2009 No. 43)
- The International Organisations (Immunities and Privileges) (Scotland) Order 2009 (S.S.I. 2009 No. 44)
- The Specified Animal Pathogens (Scotland) Order 2009 (S.S.I. 2009 No. 45)
- The A835/A893 Trunk Road (Garve) (40 mph Speed Limit) Order 2009 (S.S.I. 2009 No. 46)
- The Prohibited Procedures on Protected Animals (Exemptions) (Scotland) Amendment Regulations 2009 (S.S.I. 2009 No. 47)
- The Home Energy Assistance Scheme (Scotland) Regulations 2009 (S.S.I. 2009 No. 48)
- The Advice and Assistance and Civil Legal Aid (Priority of Debts) (Scotland) Regulations 2009 (S.S.I. 2009 No. 49)
- The Local Government Finance Act 1992 (Scotland) Order 2009 (S.S.I. 2009 No. 50)
- The Town and Country Planning (Hierarchy of Developments) (Scotland) Regulations 2009 (S.S.I. 2009 No. 51)
- The Town and Country Planning (Amount of Fixed Penalty) (Scotland) Regulations 2009 (S.S.I. 2009 No. 52)
- The Town and Country Planning (Grounds for Declining to Follow Recommendations) (Scotland) Regulations 2009 (S.S.I. 2009 No. 53)
- The A82 Trunk Road (Glencoe Village to North Ballachulish Cycle Track) (Redetermination of Means of Exercise of Public Right of Passage) Order 2009 (S.S.I. 2009 No. 54)
- The Police Grant (Revocation and Variation No. 2) (Scotland) Order 2009 (S.S.I. 2009 No. 55)
- The South West Unit Trunk Roads Area (Temporary Prohibitions of Traffic, Temporary Prohibitions of Overtaking and Temporary Speed Restrictions) (No.2) Order 2009 (S.S.I. 2009 No. 56)
- The North West Unit Trunk Roads Area (Temporary Prohibitions of Traffic, Temporary Prohibitions of Overtaking and Temporary Speed Restrictions) (No.2) Order 2009 (S.S.I. 2009 No. 57)
- The South East Unit Trunk Roads Area (Temporary Prohibitions of Traffic, Temporary Prohibitions of Overtaking and Temporary Speed Restrictions) (No.2) Order 2009 (S.S.I. 2009 No. 58)
- The North East Unit Trunk Roads Area (Temporary Prohibitions o Traffic, Temporary Prohibitions of Overtaking and Temporary Speed Restrictions) (No.2) Order 2009 (S.S.I. 2009 No. 59)
- The Education (Listed Bodies) (Scotland) Amendment Order 2009 (S.S.I. 2009 No. 60)
- The Education (Recognised Bodies) (Scotland) Amendment Order 2009 (S.S.I. 2009 No. 61)
- The A82 Trunk Road (Barnhill Road and Strowans Well Road, Dumbarton) (Temporary Prohibition of Specified Turns) Order 2009 (S.S.I. 2009 No. 62)
- Act of Sederunt (Rules of the Court of Session Amendment) (Miscellaneous) 2009 (S.S.I. 2009 No. 63)
- The Registration Services (Fees, etc.) (Scotland) Amendment Regulations 2009 (S.S.I. 2009 No. 64)
- The Registration of Births, Deaths and Marriages (Fees) (Scotland) Order 2009 (S.S.I. 2009 No. 65)
- The Arrestment Jurisdiction (Scotland) Order 2009 (S.S.I. 2009 No. 66)
- The Bankruptcy and Diligence etc. (Scotland) Act 2007 (Commencement No. 4, Savings and Transitionals) Order 2009 (S.S.I. 2009 No. 67 (C. 4))
- The Diligence (Scotland) Regulations 2009 (S.S.I. 2009 No. 68)
- The Non-Domestic Rating (Petrol Filling Stations, Public Houses and Hotels) (Scotland) Order 2009 (S.S.I. 2009 No. 69)
- The Planning etc. (Scotland) Act 2006 (Commencement No. 6) Order 2009 (S.S.I. 2009 No. 70 (C. 5))
- The Victim Statements (Prescribed Offences) (No. 2) (Scotland) Order 2009 (S.S.I. 2009 No. 71)
- The National Assistance (Assessment of Resources) Amendment (Scotland) Regulations 2009 (S.S.I. 2009 No. 72)
- The National Assistance (Sums for Personal Requirements) (Scotland) Regulations 2009 (S.S.I. 2009 No. 73)
- The Road Works (Inspection Fees) (Scotland) Amendment Regulations 2009 (S.S.I. 2009 No. 74)
- The Financial Assistance for Environmental Purposes (Scotland) Order 2009 (S.S.I. 2009 No. 75)
- The Non-Domestic Rating (Payment of Interest) (Scotland) Amendment Regulations 2009 (S.S.I. 2009 No. 76)
- The A80 Trunk Road (Stepps to Haggs) (Temporary 40 mph Speed Restriction) Order 2009 (S.S.I. 2009 No. 77)
- The A80 Trunk Road (Castlecary Interchange) (Temporary Prohibition of Specified Turns ) Order 2009 (S.S.I. 2009 No. 78)
- The A835/A893 Trunk Road (Shore Street, Ullapool) (Prohibition of Waiting) Order 2009 (S.S.I. 2009 No. 79)
- The Police Grant (Scotland) Order 2009 (S.S.I. 2009 No. 80)
- Act of Sederunt (Fees of Solicitors in the Sheriff Court) (Amendment) 2009 (S.S.I. 2009 No. 81)
- Act of Sederunt (Rules of the Court of Session Amendment No. 2) (Fees of Solicitors) 2009 (S.S.I. 2009 No. 82)
- The Judiciary and Courts (Scotland) Act 2008 (Commencement No. 1) Order 2009 (S.S.I. 2009 No. 83 (C. 6))
- The A85 Trunk Road (St Fillans) (50 mph Speed Limit) Order 2009 (S.S.I. 2009 No. 84)
- The Aquatic Animal Health (Scotland) Regulations 2009 (S.S.I. 2009 No. 85)
- The National Health Service (Optical Charges and Payments) (Scotland) Amendment Regulations 2009 (S.S.I. 2009 No. 86)
- The High Court of Justiciary Fees Amendment Order 2009 (S.S.I. 2009 No. 87)
- The Court of Session etc. Fees Amendment Order 2009 (S.S.I. 2009 No. 88)
- The Sheriff Court Fees Amendment Order 2009 (S.S.I. 2009 No. 89)
- The Regulation of Care (Requirements as to Limited Registration Services) (Scotland) Amendment Regulations 2009 (S.S.I. 2009 No. 90)
- The Regulation of Care (Fitness of Employees in Relation to Care Services) (Scotland) Regulations 2009 (S.S.I. 2009 No. 91)
- The M9/A9 Trunk Road (Ashfield to Aberuthven) (Temporary Prohibition of Specified Turns) Order 2009 (S.S.I. 2009 No. 92)
- The Local Government Pension Scheme Amendment (Scotland) Regulations 2009 (S.S.I. 2009 No. 93)
- The Representation of the People (Absent Voting at Local Government Elections) (Scotland) Amendment Order 2009 (S.S.I. 2009 No. 94)
- The A737/A738 Trunk Road (New Street and Townend Street, Dalry) (Prohibition of Waiting, Prohibition of Loading and Unloading, Prohibition of Specified Turns and Waiting Restrictions) Order 2009 (S.S.I. 2009 No. 95)
- The National Health Service (General Dental Services) (Scotland) Amendment Regulations 2009 (S.S.I. 2009 No. 96)
- The Bankruptcy Fees (Scotland) Amendment Regulations 2009 (S.S.I. 2009 No. 97)
- The Diligence against Earnings (Variation) (Scotland) Regulations 2009 (S.S.I. 2009 No. 98)
- The European Communities (European Order for Payment) (Scotland) Regulations 2009 (S.S.I. 2009 No. 99)
- The Planning etc. (Scotland) Act 2006 (Commencement No. 7) Order 2009 (S.S.I. 2009 No. 100 (C. 7))

== 101-200 ==
- The Planning etc. (Scotland) Act 2006 (Saving and Transitional Provisions) Order 2009 (S.S.I. 2009 No. 101)
- The Repayment of Student Loans (Scotland) Amendment Regulations 2009 (S.S.I. 2009 No. 102)
- Act of Sederunt (Fees of Shorthand Writers in the Sheriff Court) (Amendment) 2009 (S.S.I. 2009 No. 103)
- Act of Sederunt (Rules of the Court of Session Amendment No. 3) (Diligence) 2009 (S.S.I. 2009 No. 104)
- Act of Sederunt (Rules of the Court of Session Amendment No.4) (Fees of Shorthand Writers) 2009 (S.S.I. 2009 No. 105)
- The Crime (International Co-operation) Act 2003 (Designation of Participating Countries) (Scotland) Order 2009 (S.S.I. 2009 No. 106)
- Act of Sederunt (Sheriff Court Rules Amendment) (Diligence) 2009 (S.S.I. 2009 No. 107)
- Act of Adjournal (Amendment of the Criminal Procedure (Scotland) Act 1995) (Appeals by Stated Case) 2009 (S.S.I. 2009 No. 108)
- Act of Sederunt (Summary Applications, Statutory Applications and Appeals etc. Rules) Amendment (Employment Tribunals Act 1996) 2009 (S.S.I. 2009 No. 109)
- The Enforcement of Fines etc. (Diligence) (Scotland) Regulations 2009 (S.S.I. 2009 No. 110)
- The A83 Trunk Road (Inveraray) (30 mph and 40 mph Speed Limits) Order 2009 (S.S.I. 2009 No. 111)
- The Non-Domestic Rating (Valuation of Utilities) (Scotland) Amendment Order 2009 (S.S.I. 2009 No. 112)
- The A76 Trunk Road (Horse Ploughing Match, Mauchline) (Temporary Prohibition of Waiting and Loading) Order 2009 (S.S.I. 2009 No. 113)
- Act of Sederunt (Rules of the Court of Session Amendment No. 5) (Exchequer Appeals) 2009 (S.S.I. 2009 No. 114)
- The Justice of the Peace Courts (Sheriffdom of South Strathclyde, Dumfries and Galloway) Order 2009 (S.S.I. 2009 No. 115)
- The Criminal Proceedings etc. (Reform) (Scotland) Act 2007 (Commencement No. 7) Order 2009 (S.S.I. 2009 No. 116 (C. 8))
- The Building (Procedure) (Scotland) Amendment Regulations 2009 (S.S.I. 2009 No. 117)
- The Regulation of Care (Fitness of Employees in Relation to Care Services) (Scotland) (No. 2) Regulations 2009 (S.S.I. 2009 No. 118)
- The Building (Scotland) Amendment Regulations 2009 (S.S.I. 2009 No. 119)
- The Budget (Scotland) Acts 2007 and 2008 Amendment Order 2009 (S.S.I. 2009 No. 120)
- The Charities and Benevolent Fundraising (Scotland) Regulations 2009 (S.S.I. 2009 No. 121)
- The Housing (Scotland) Act 2006 (Commencement No. 7, Savings and Transitional Provisions) Order 2009 (S.S.I. 2009 No. 122 (C. 9))
- The South West Unit Trunk Roads Area (Temporary Prohibitions of Traffic, Temporary Prohibitions of Overtaking and Temporary Speed Restrictions)(No.3) Order 2009 (S.S.I. 2009 No. 123)
- The National Health Service (Travelling Expenses and Remission of Charges) (Scotland) Amendment Regulations 2009 (S.S.I. 2009 No. 124)
- The South East Unit Trunk Roads Area (Temporary Prohibitions of Traffic, Temporary Prohibitions of Overtaking and Temporary Speed Restrictions)(No.3) Order 2009 (S.S.I. 2009 No. 125)
- The North West Unit Trunk Roads Area (Temporary Prohibitions of Traffic, Temporary Prohibitions of Overtaking and Temporary Speed Restrictions)(No.3) Order 2009 (S.S.I. 2009 No. 126)
- The North East Unit Trunk Roads Area (Temporary Prohibitions of Traffic, Temporary Prohibitions of Overtaking and Temporary Speed Restrictions)(No.3) Order 2009 (S.S.I. 2009 No. 127)
- The Representation of the People (Postal Voting for Local Government Elections) (Scotland) Amendment Regulations 2009 (S.S.I. 2009 No. 128)
- The Bankruptcy and Diligence etc. (Scotland) Act 2007 (Inhibition) Order 2009 (S.S.I. 2009 No. 129)
- The Regulation of Care (Fitness to Register, Provide and Manage Care Services) (Scotland) Amendment Regulations 2009 (S.S.I. 2009 No. 130)
- The Regulation of Care (Scotland) Act 2001 (Minimum Frequency of Inspections) Order 2009 (S.S.I. 2009 No. 131)
- The Local Government Finance Act 1992 (Scotland) Amendment Order 2009 (S.S.I. 2009 No. 132)
- The Diligence against Earnings (Variation) (Scotland) Revocation Regulations 2009 (S.S.I. 2009 No. 133)
- The Victim Statements (Prescribed Courts) (Scotland) Order 2009 (S.S.I. 2009 No. 134)
- Act of Sederunt (Rules of the Court of Session Amendment No. 6) (Building Society Special Administration etc.) 2009 (S.S.I. 2009 No. 135)
- The A77 Trunk Road (Haggstone Climbing Lane and Glen App Carriageway Improvement) (Temporary Prohibition of Traffic, Temporary Prohibition of Overtaking and Temporary Speed Restriction) Revocation Order 2009 (S.S.I. 2009 No. 136)
- The Community Care and Health (Scotland) Act 2002 (Amendment to schedule 1) Order 2009 (S.S.I. 2009 No. 137)
- The Community Care (Personal Care and Nursing Care) (Scotland) Amendment Regulations 2009 (S.S.I. 2009 No. 138)
- The Housing Support Grant (Scotland) Order 2009 (S.S.I. 2009 No. 139)
- The Renewables Obligation (Scotland) Order 2009 (S.S.I. 2009 No. 140)
- The Licensing of Animal Dealers (Young Cats and Young Dogs) (Scotland) Regulations 2009 (S.S.I. 2009 No. 141)
- The Victim Notification (Prescribed Offences) (Scotland) Amendment Order 2009 (S.S.I. 2009 No. 142)
- The Advice and Assistance and Civil Legal Aid (Financial Conditions and Contributions) (Scotland) Regulations 2009 (S.S.I. 2009 No. 143)
- Act of Adjournal (Criminal Procedure Rules Amendment) (Miscellaneous) 2009 (S.S.I. 2009 No. 144)
- The Civic Government (Scotland) Act 1982 (Licensing of Booking Offices) Order 2009 (S.S.I. 2009 No. 145)
- The A76 Trunk Road (Mauchline) (Prohibition of Waiting, Loading and Unloading) Order 2009 (S.S.I. 2009 No. 146)
- The Adoption and Children (Scotland) Act 2007 (Commencement No. 3) Order 2009 (S.S.I. 2009 No. 147 (C. 10))
- The M90/A90 Trunk Road (B957 Finavon Junction, Angus) (Prohibition of Specified Turns) Order 2009 (S.S.I. 2009 No. 148)
- The A7 Trunk Road (Hawick) (Prohibition of Waiting and Loading) Order 2009 (S.S.I. 2009 No. 149)
- The Building (Scotland) Act 2003 (Commencement No. 2 and Transitional Provisions) Order 2009 (S.S.I. 2009 No. 150 (C. 11))
- The Public Service Vehicles (Registration of Local Services) (Scotland) Amendment Regulations 2009 (S.S.I. 2009 No. 151)
- The Adoption Support Services and Allowances (Scotland) Regulations 2009 (S.S.I. 2009 No. 152)
- The Plant Health (Scotland) Amendment Order 2009 (S.S.I. 2009 No. 153)
- The Adoption Agencies (Scotland) Regulations 2009 (S.S.I. 2009 No. 154)
- The Rural Development Contracts (Land Managers Options) (Scotland) Amendment Regulations 2009 (S.S.I. 2009 No. 155)
- The Community Right to Buy (Prescribed Form of Application and Notices) (Scotland) Regulations 2009 (S.S.I. 2009 No. 156)
- The South West Unit Trunk Roads Area (Temporary Prohibitions of Traffic, Temporary Prohibitions of Overtaking and Temporary Speed Restrictions) (No.4) Order 2009 (S.S.I. 2009 No. 157)
- The South East Unit Trunk Roads Area (Temporary Prohibitions of Traffic, Temporary Prohibitions of Overtaking and Temporary Speed Restrictions) (No.4) Order 2009 (S.S.I. 2009 No. 158)
- The North West Unit Trunk Roads Area (Temporary Prohibitions of Traffic, Temporary Prohibitions of Overtaking and Temporary Speed Restrictions) (No.4) Order 2009 (S.S.I. 2009 No. 159)
- The Crofting Community Body (Prescribed Form of Application and Notice) (Scotland) Regulations 2009 (S.S.I. 2009 No. 160)
- The North East Unit Trunk Roads Area (Temporary Prohibitions of Traffic, Temporary Prohibitions of Overtaking and Temporary Speed Restrictions) (No.4) Order 2009 (S.S.I. 2009 No. 161)
- Act of Sederunt (Fees of Members of the Association of Commercial Attorneys in the Sheriff Court) 2009 (S.S.I. 2009 No. 162)
- Act of Sederunt (Sections 25 to 29 of the Law Reform (Miscellaneous Provisions) (Scotland) Act 1990) (Association of Commercial Attorneys) 2009 (S.S.I. 2009 No. 163)
- Act of Sederunt (Sheriff Court Rules Amendment) (Sections 25 to 29 of the Law Reform (Miscellaneous Provisions) (Scotland) Act 1990) 2009 (S.S.I. 2009 No. 164)
- The Sea Fish (Specified Sea Areas) (Regulation of Nets and Other Fishing Gear) (Scotland) Amendment Order 2009 (S.S.I. 2009 No. 165)
- The National Health Service (Appointment of Consultants) (Scotland) Regulations 2009 (S.S.I. 2009 No. 166)
- The Purity Criteria for Colours, Sweeteners and Miscellaneous Food Additives (Scotland) Regulations 2009 (S.S.I. 2009 No. 167)
- The Period to Prepare an Adoption Allowances Scheme (Scotland) Order 2009 (S.S.I. 2009 No. 168)
- The Adoption and Children (Scotland) Act 2007 (Supervision Requirement Reports in Applications for Permanence Orders) Regulations 2009 (S.S.I. 2009 No. 169)
- The Applications to the Court of Session to Annul Convention Adoptions or Overseas Adoptions (Scotland) Regulations 2009 (S.S.I. 2009 No. 170)
- The Fees in the Registers of Scotland Amendment Order 2009 (S.S.I. 2009 No. 171)
- The Damages (Asbestos-related Conditions) (Scotland) Act 2009 (Commencement) Order 2009 (S.S.I. 2009 No. 172 (C. 12))
- The Swine Vesicular Disease (Scotland) Order 2009 (S.S.I. 2009 No. 173)
- The Products of Animal Origin (Disease Control) (Scotland) Amendment Order 2009 (S.S.I. 2009 No. 174)
- The M9/A9 Trunk Road (Crossgates to Tibbermore) (Temporary Prohibition of Specified Turns) Order 2009 (S.S.I. 2009 No. 175)
- The Individual Learning Account (Scotland) Amendment Regulations 2009 (S.S.I. 2009 No. 176)
- The National Health Service (Pharmaceutical Services, Charges for Drugs and Appliances and Charges to Overseas Visitors) (Scotland) Amendment Regulations 2009 (S.S.I. 2009 No. 177)
- The Education (School Lunches) (Scotland) Regulations 2009 (S.S.I. 2009 No. 178)
- The Planning etc. (Scotland) Act 2006 (Commencement No. 8) Order 2009 (S.S.I. 2009 No. 179 (C. 13))
- The Justice of the Peace Courts (Sheriffdom of South Strathclyde, Dumfries and Galloway) Revocation Order 2009 (S.S.I. 2009 No. 180)
- The St Mary’s Music School (Aided Places) (Scotland) Amendment Regulations 2009 (S.S.I. 2009 No. 181)
- The Adoptions with a Foreign Element (Scotland) Regulations 2009 (S.S.I. 2009 No. 182)
- The National Health Service (Pharmaceutical Services) (Scotland) Regulations 2009 (S.S.I. 2009 No. 183)
- The Firefighters' Pension Scheme Amendment (Increased Pension Entitlement) (Scotland) Order 2009 (S.S.I. 2009 No. 184)
- The Police Pensions Amendment (Increased Pension Entitlement) (Scotland) Regulations 2009 (S.S.I. 2009 No. 185)
- The Local Government Pension Scheme Amendment (Increased Pension Entitlement) (Scotland) Regulations 2009 (S.S.I. 2009 No. 186)
- The Local Government (Discretionary Payments and Injury Benefits) (Scotland) Amendment Regulations 2009 (S.S.I. 2009 No. 187)
- The Education (Fees and Awards for EC Nationals and UK Returners) (Scotland) Regulations 2009 (S.S.I. 2009 No. 188)
- The Education (Interest on Student Loans) (Scotland) Regulations 2009 (S.S.I. 2009 No. 189)
- The Title Conditions (Scotland) Act 2003 (Commencement No. 2) Order 2009 (S.S.I. 2009 No. 190 (C. 14))
- The Parental Responsibilities and Parental Rights Agreement (Scotland) Amendment Regulations 2009 (S.S.I. 2009 No. 191)
- The Judiciary and Courts (Scotland) Act 2008 (Commencement No. 2) Order 2009 (S.S.I. 2009 No. 192 (C. 15))
- The Personal Injuries (NHS Charges) (Scotland) Amendment Regulations 2009 (S.S.I. 2009 No. 193)
- The University of the West of Scotland Order of Council 2009 (S.S.I. 2009 No. 194)
- The A830 Trunk Road (Arisaig – Loch Nan Uamh Improvement) (Temporary Prohibition of Traffic, Temporary Prohibition of Overtaking and Temporary Speed Restriction) Order 2009 (S.S.I. 2009 No. 195)
- The Non-Domestic Rating (Valuation of Utilities) (Scotland) Amendment (No. 2) Order 2009 (S.S.I. 2009 No. 196)
- The Custodial Sentences and Weapons (Scotland) Act 2007 (Commencement No. 2 and Transitional Provisions) Order 2009 (S.S.I. 2009 No. 197 (C. 16))
- The South West Unit Trunk Roads Area (Temporary Prohibitions of Traffic, Temporary Prohibitions of Overtaking and Temporary Speed Restrictions) (No.5) Order 2009 (S.S.I. 2009 No. 198)
- The South East Unit Trunk Roads Area (Temporary Prohibitions of Traffic, Temporary Prohibitions of Overtaking and Temporary Speed Restrictions) (No.5) Order 2009 (S.S.I. 2009 No. 199)
- The North West Unit Trunk Roads Area (Temporary Prohibitions of Traffic, Temporary Prohibitions of Overtaking and Temporary Speed Restrictions) (No.5) Order 2009 (S.S.I. 2009 No. 200)

== 201-300 ==
- The North East Unit Trunk Roads Area (Temporary Prohibitions of Traffic, Temporary Prohibitions of Overtaking and Temporary Speed Restrictions) (No.5) Order 2009 (S.S.I. 2009 No. 201)
- The Radioactive Contaminated Land (Scotland) Amendment Regulations 2009 (S.S.I. 2009 No. 202)
- The Civil Legal Aid (Scotland) (Fees) Amendment Regulations 2009 (S.S.I. 2009 No. 203)
- The A96 Trunk Road (Great Northern Road/Auchmill Road, Aberdeen) (Bus Lane and Traffic Management) (Variation) Order 2009 (S.S.I. 2009 No. 204)
- The Local Government and Housing Act 1989 Amendment (Scotland) Order 2009 (S.S.I. 2009 No. 205)
- The Crime (International Co-operation) Act 2003 (Designation of Participating Countries) (Scotland) (No. 2) Order 2009 (S.S.I. 2009 No. 206)
- The Community Right to Buy (Definition of Excluded Land) (Scotland) Order 2009 (S.S.I. 2009 No. 207)
- The National Health Service (Superannuation Scheme, Pension Scheme and Injury Benefits) (Scotland) Amendment (No. 2) Regulations 2009 (S.S.I. 2009 No. 208)
- The National Health Service (Pharmaceutical Services) (Scotland) Amendment Regulations 2009 (S.S.I. 2009 No. 209)
- The Looked After Children (Scotland) Regulations 2009 (S.S.I. 2009 No. 210)
- The Children’s Hearings (Legal Representation) (Scotland) Amendment Rules 2009 (S.S.I. 2009 No. 211)
- The Town and Country Planning (Inquiries Procedure) (Scotland) Amendment Rules 2009 (S.S.I. 2009 No. 212)
- The Town and Country Planning (Temporary Stop Notice) (Scotland) Regulations 2009 (S.S.I. 2009 No. 213)
- The Smoke Control Areas (Exempt Fireplaces) (Scotland) Order 2009 (S.S.I. 2009 No. 214)
- The Contaminants in Food (Scotland) Regulations 2009 (S.S.I. 2009 No. 215)
- The Police Act 1997 (Criminal Records) (Scotland) Amendment (No. 2) Regulations 2009 (S.S.I. 2009 No. 216)
- The Knife Dealers (Licence Conditions) Order 2009 (S.S.I. 2009 No. 217)
- The Knife Dealers (Exceptions) Order 2009 (S.S.I. 2009 No. 218)
- The Planning etc. (Scotland) Act 2006 (Commencement No. 9) Order 2009 (S.S.I. 2009 No. 219 (C. 17))
- The Town and Country Planning (Miscellaneous Amendments) (Scotland) Regulations 2009 (S.S.I. 2009 No. 220)
- The Environmental Impact Assessment (Scotland) Amendment Regulations 2009 (S.S.I. 2009 No. 221)
- The Planning etc. (Scotland) Act 2006 (Development Management and Appeals) (Saving, Transitional and Consequential Provisions) Order 2009 (S.S.I. 2009 No. 222)
- The Seed (Scotland) (Amendments for Conservation Varieties) Regulations 2009 (S.S.I. 2009 No. 223)
- The Serious Crime Act 2007 (Commencement No. 2) (Scotland) Order 2009 (S.S.I. 2009 No. 224 (C. 18))
- The Marketing of Horticultural Produce (Scotland) Regulations 2009 (S.S.I. 2009 No. 225)
- The Seed Potatoes (Scotland) Amendment Regulations 2009 (S.S.I. 2009 No. 226)
- The Animals and Animal Products (Import and Export) (Scotland) Amendment Regulations 2009 (S.S.I. 2009 No. 227)
- The Products of Animal Origin (Third Country Imports) (Scotland) Amendment Regulations 2009 (S.S.I. 2009 No. 228)
- The Control of Salmonella in Poultry (Breeding, Laying and Broiler Flocks) (Scotland) Order 2009 (S.S.I. 2009 No. 229)
- The Zoonoses and Animal By-Products (Fees) (Scotland) Regulations 2009 (S.S.I. 2009 No. 230)
- The Horse Identification (Scotland) Regulations 2009 (S.S.I. 2009 No. 231)
- The Brucellosis (Scotland) Order 2009 (S.S.I. 2009 No. 232)
- The Rural Development Contracts (Rural Priorities) (Scotland) Amendment (No. 2) Regulations 2009 (S.S.I. 2009 No. 233)
- The Debt Arrangement Scheme (Scotland) Amendment Regulations 2009 (S.S.I. 2009 No. 234)
- The Fire and Rescue Authorities (Appointment of Chief Inspector) (Scotland) Order 2009 (S.S.I. 2009 No. 235)
- The Scottish Public Services Ombudsman Act 2002 (Amendment) Order 2009 (S.S.I. 2009 No. 236)
- The M8 Motorway (Junction 21, Paisley Road) (Temporary Prohibition of Traffic) (No.2) Order 2009 (S.S.I. 2009 No. 237)
- The Criminal Proceedings etc. (Reform) (Scotland) Act 2007 (Commencement No. 7) Revocation Order 2009 (S.S.I. 2009 No. 238 (C. 19))
- The A830 Trunk Road (Arisaig to Loch nan Uamh) (40 and 30 mph Speed Limit) Order 2009 (S.S.I. 2009 No. 239)
- The Management of Offenders etc. (Scotland) Act 2005 (Commencement No. 6) Order 2009 (S.S.I. 2009 No. 240 (C. 20))
- The A9 Trunk Road (Bankfoot) (Prohibition of Specified Turns) Order 2009 (S.S.I. 2009 No. 241)
- The Health Boards (Membership and Elections) (Scotland) Act 2009 (Commencement No. 1) Order 2009 (S.S.I. 2009 No. 242 (C. 21))
- Act of Adjournal (Criminal Procedure Rules Amendment No. 2) (Contempt of Court) 2009 (S.S.I. 2009 No. 243)
- Act of Adjournal (Criminal Procedure Rules Amendment No. 3) (Confiscation Proceedings) 2009 (S.S.I. 2009 No. 244)
- The Proceeds of Crime Act 2002 (Investigations: Code of Practice) (Scotland) Order 2009 (S.S.I. 2009 No. 245)
- The Proceeds of Crime Act 2002 (Cash Searches: Constables in Scotland: Code of Practice) Order 2009 (S.S.I. 2009 No. 246)
- The Waste Batteries (Scotland) Regulations 2009 (S.S.I. 2009 No. 247)
- The Licensing (Scotland) Act 2005 (Consequential Provisions) Order 2009 (S.S.I. 2009 No. 248)
- The A702 Trunk Road Improvement (Candymill Bend and Edmonston Brae) (Side Roads) Order 2009 (S.S.I. 2009 No. 249)
- The A702 Trunk Road Improvement (Candymill Bend and Edmonston Brae) (Trunking and Detrunking) Order 2009 (S.S.I. 2009 No. 250)
- The A68 Trunk Road (Pathhead to Tynehead Junction Improvement) (Side Roads) Order 2009 (S.S.I. 2009 No. 251)
- The South West Unit Trunk Roads Area (Temporary Prohibitions of Traffic, Temporary Prohibitions of Overtaking and Temporary Speed Restrictions) (No. 6) Order 2009 (S.S.I. 2009 No. 252)
- The South East Unit Trunk Roads Area (Temporary Prohibitions of Traffic, Temporary Prohibitions of Overtaking and Temporary Speed Restrictions) (No. 6) Order 2009 (S.S.I. 2009 No. 253)
- The North West Unit Trunk Roads Area (Temporary Prohibitions of Traffic, Temporary Prohibitions of Overtaking and Temporary Speed Restrictions) (No. 6) Order 2009 (S.S.I. 2009 No. 254)
- The North East Unit Trunk Roads Area (Temporary Prohibitions of Traffic, Temporary Prohibitions of Overtaking and Temporary Speed Restrictions) (No. 6) Order 2009 (S.S.I. 2009 No. 255)
- The Planning etc. (Scotland) Act 2006 (Consequential Amendments) Order 2009 (S.S.I. 2009 No. 256)
- The Town and Country Planning (Charges for Publication of Notices) (Scotland) Regulations 2009 (S.S.I. 2009 No. 257)
- The Debt Arrangement Scheme (Scotland) Revocation Regulations 2009 (S.S.I. 2009 No. 258)
- The Lands Tribunal for Scotland Amendment Rules 2009 (S.S.I. 2009 No. 259)
- The Lands Tribunal for Scotland Amendment (Fees) Rules 2009 (S.S.I. 2009 No. 260)
- The Food Irradiation (Scotland) Regulations 2009 (S.S.I. 2009 No. 261)
- The Meat (Official Controls Charges) (Scotland) Regulations 2009 (S.S.I. 2009 No. 262)
- The Feed (Hygiene and Enforcement) (Scotland) Amendment Regulations 2009 (S.S.I. 2009 No. 263)
- The A82 Trunk Road (Scottish Open Golf Tournament, Loch Lomond) (Special Event) (Temporary Restriction of Speed) Order 2009 (S.S.I. 2009 No. 264)
- The M90/A90 Trunk Road (Gairneybridge to Milnathort) (Temporary 50 mph Speed Limit) Order 2009 (S.S.I. 2009 No. 265)
- The Environmental Liability (Scotland) Regulations 2009 (S.S.I. 2009 No. 266)
- The Adoption and Children (Scotland) Act 2007 (Commencement No. 4, Transitional and Savings Provisions) Order 2009 (S.S.I. 2009 No. 267 (C. 22))
- The Adoption (Disclosure of Information and Medical Information about Natural Parents) (Scotland) Regulations 2009 (S.S.I. 2009 No. 268)
- The Management of Offenders etc. (Scotland) Act 2005 (Commencement No. 7) Order 2009 (S.S.I. 2009 No. 269 (C. 23))
- The Licensing (Mandatory Conditions) (Scotland) Regulations 2009 (S.S.I. 2009 No. 270)
- The Rehabilitation of Offenders Act 1974 (Exclusions and Exceptions) (Scotland) Amendment Order 2009 (S.S.I. 2009 No. 271)
- The M77/A77 and A78 Trunk Roads (British Open Golf Championship, Turnberry) (Temporary Prohibition of Waiting and Loading, Temporary Speed Restriction and Temporary Prohibition of Traffic) Order 2009 (S.S.I. 2009 No. 272)
- The Natural Mineral Water, Spring Water and Bottled Drinking Water (Scotland) Amendment Regulations 2009 (S.S.I. 2009 No. 273)
- The M8 Motorway (Junction 21, Paisley Road) (Temporary Prohibition of Traffic) (No.3) Order 2009 (S.S.I. 2009 No. 274)
- The Local Government in Scotland Act 2003 (Commencement No. 4) Order 2009 (S.S.I. 2009 No. 275 (C. 24))
- The Renewables Obligation (Scotland) Amendment Order 2009 (S.S.I. 2009 No. 276)
- The Licensing (Scotland) Act 2005 (Transitional Provisions) Order 2009 (S.S.I. 2009 No. 277)
- The M8 Motorway (Junction 21, Carnoustie Street) (Temporary Prohibition of Traffic) Order 2009 (S.S.I. 2009 No. 278)
- The South East Unit Trunk Roads Area (Temporary Prohibitions of Traffic, Temporary Prohibitions of Overtaking and Temporary Speed Restrictions) (No.7) Order 2009 (S.S.I. 2009 No. 279)
- The North East Unit Trunk Roads Area (Temporary Prohibitions of Traffic, Temporary Prohibitions of Overtaking and Temporary Speed Restrictions) (No.7) Order 2009 (S.S.I. 2009 No. 280)
- The South West Unit Trunk Roads Area (Temporary Prohibitions of Traffic, Temporary Prohibitions of Overtaking and Temporary Speed Restrictions) (No.7) Order 2009 (S.S.I. 2009 No. 281)
- The North West Unit Trunk Roads Area (Temporary Prohibitions of Traffic, Temporary Prohibitions of Overtaking and Temporary Speed Restrictions) (No.7) Order 2009 (S.S.I. 2009 No. 282)
- Act of Sederunt (Rules of the Court of Session Amendment No.7) (Adoption and Children (Scotland) Act 2007) 2009 (S.S.I. 2009 No. 283)
- Act of Sederunt (Sheriff Court Rules Amendment) (Adoption and Children (Scotland) Act 2007) 2009 (S.S.I. 2009 No. 284)
- Act of Sederunt (Ordinary Cause Rules Amendment) (Personal Injuries Actions) 2009 (S.S.I. 2009 No. 285)
- The Ethical Standards in Public Life etc. (Scotland) Act 2000 (Devolved Public Bodies) Order 2009 (S.S.I. 2009 No. 286)
- The Ethical Standards in Public Life etc. (Scotland) Act 2000 (Codes of Conduct for Members of certain Scottish Public Authorities) Amendment Order 2009 (S.S.I. 2009 No. 287)
- The National Health Service (Optical Charges and Payments) (Scotland) Amendment (No. 2) Regulations 2009 (S.S.I. 2009 No. 288)
- The A80 Trunk Road (Haggs to Bankhead) (Temporary 40 mph Speed Restriction) Order 2009 (S.S.I. 2009 No. 289)
- The Looked After Children (Scotland) Amendment Regulations 2009 (S.S.I. 2009 No. 290)
- The Maximum Number of Judges (Transitional Provision) (Scotland) Order 2009 (S.S.I. 2009 No. 291)
- Act of Sederunt (Commissary Business) (Amendment) 2009 (S.S.I. 2009 No. 292)
- The Sheriff Court Districts Amendment Order 2009 (S.S.I. 2009 No. 293)
- Act of Sederunt (Sheriff Court Rules) (Miscellaneous Amendments) 2009 (S.S.I. 2009 No. 294)
- Act of Sederunt (Lands Valuation Appeal Court) 2009 (S.S.I. 2009 No. 295)
- The South West Unit Trunk Roads Area (Temporary Prohibitions of Traffic, Temporary Prohibitions of Overtaking and Temporary Speed Restrictions) (No.8) Order 2009 (S.S.I. 2009 No. 296)
- The South East Unit Trunk Roads Area (Temporary Prohibitions of Traffic, Temporary Prohibitions of Overtaking and Temporary Speed Restrictions) (No.8) Order 2009 (S.S.I. 2009 No. 297)
- The North West Unit Trunk Roads Area (Temporary Prohibitions of Traffic, Temporary Prohibitions of Overtaking and Temporary Speed Restrictions) (No.8) Order 2009 (S.S.I. 2009 No. 298)
- The North East Unit Trunk Roads Area (Temporary Prohibitions of Traffic, Temporary Prohibitions of Overtaking and Temporary Speed Restrictions) (No.8) Order 2009 (S.S.I. 2009 No. 299)
- The A92/A972 Trunk Road (Gellatly Street to Greendykes Road) (Temporary Prohibition of Specified Turns) Order 2009 (S.S.I. 2009 No. 300)

== 301-400 ==
- The Public Health etc. (Scotland) Act 2008 Designation of Competent Persons Regulations 2009 (S.S.I. 2009 No. 301)
- The Health Boards (Membership) (Scotland) Regulations 2009 (S.S.I. 2009 No. 302)
- The Scottish Court Service (Procedure for Appointment of Members) Regulations 2009 (S.S.I. 2009 No. 303)
- The Sea Fishing (Enforcement of Community Control Measures) (Scotland) Amendment Order 2009 (S.S.I. 2009 No. 304)
- The Plant Health (Import Inspection Fees) (Scotland) Amendment (No. 2) Regulations 2009 (S.S.I. 2009 No. 305)
- The Seed Potatoes (Fees) (Scotland) Regulations 2009 (S.S.I. 2009 No. 306)
- The Children’s Hearings (Scotland) Amendment Rules 2009 (S.S.I. 2009 No. 307)
- The National Health Service (Discipline Committees) (Scotland) Amendment Regulations 2009 (S.S.I. 2009 No. 308)
- The Education (Fees, Awards and Student Support) (Miscellaneous Amendments) (Scotland) Regulations 2009 (S.S.I. 2009 No. 309)
- The Limited Liability Partnerships (Scotland) Amendment Regulations 2009 (S.S.I. 2009 No. 310)
- The Judiciary and Courts (Scotland) Act 2008 (Transitional Provision) Order 2009 (S.S.I. 2009 No. 311)
- The Legal Aid (Supreme Court) (Scotland) Regulations 2009 (S.S.I. 2009 No. 312)
- The A92/A972 Trunk Road (Kingsway East Fire Station Exit) (Prohibition of Specified Turns) Order 2009 (S.S.I. 2009 No. 313)
- The Registration Services (Prescription of Forms) (Scotland) Regulations 2009 (S.S.I. 2009 No. 314)
- The Registration of Births, Still-births, Deaths and Marriages (Prescription of Forms) (Scotland) Amendment Regulations 2009 (S.S.I. 2009 No. 315)
- The Protection of Children (Scotland) Act 2003 (The Meaning of Disqualified from Working with Children: Corresponding Disqualifications in Northern Ireland) (No. 2) Order 2009 (S.S.I. 2009 No. 316)
- The Sea Fishing (Enforcement of Community Quota and Third Country Fishing Measures and Restriction on Days at Sea) (Scotland) Order 2009 (S.S.I. 2009 No. 317)
- The Judiciary and Courts (Scotland) Act 2008 (Commencement No. 3) Order 2009 (S.S.I. 2009 No. 318 (C. 25))
- The Public Health etc. (Scotland) Act 2008 (Commencement No. 2, Savings and Consequential Provisions) Order 2009 (S.S.I. 2009 No. 319 (C. 26))
- Act of Sederunt (Summary Applications, Statutory Applications and Appeals etc. Rules) Amendment (Public Health etc. (Scotland) Act 2008) 2009 (S.S.I. 2009 No. 320)
- Act of Sederunt (Fees of Solicitors in the Sheriff Court) (Amendment No. 2) 2009 (S.S.I. 2009 No. 321)
- Act of Adjournal (Criminal Procedure Rules Amendment No.4) (Devolution Issues) 2009 (S.S.I. 2009 No. 322)
- Act of Sederunt (Devolution Issues) (Appeals and References to the Supreme Court) 2009 (S.S.I. 2009 No. 323)
- The North East Unit Trunk Roads Area (Temporary Prohibitions of Traffic, Temporary Prohibitions of Overtaking and Temporary Speed Restrictions) (No.9) Order 2009 (S.S.I. 2009 No. 324)
- The North West Unit Trunk Roads Area (Temporary Prohibitions of Traffic, Temporary Prohibitions of Overtaking and Temporary Speed Restrictions) (No.9) Order 2009 (S.S.I. 2009 No. 325)
- The South East Unit Trunk Roads Area (Temporary Prohibitions of Traffic, Temporary Prohibitions of Overtaking and Temporary Speed Restrictions) (No.9) Order 2009 (S.S.I. 2009 No. 326)
- The South West Unit Trunk Roads Area (Temporary Prohibitions of Traffic, Temporary Prohibitions of Overtaking and Temporary Speed Restrictions) (No.9) Order 2009 (S.S.I. 2009 No. 327)
- The Food Labelling (Nutrition Information) (Scotland) Regulations 2009 (S.S.I. 2009 No. 328)
- The A68 Trunk Road (Lauder) (30 mph Speed Limit) Order 2009 (S.S.I. 2009 No. 329)
- The Fodder Plant Seed (Scotland) Amendment Regulations 2009 (S.S.I. 2009 No. 330)
- The Justice of the Peace Courts (Sheriffdom of North Strathclyde) etc. Order 2009 (S.S.I. 2009 No. 331)
- The Justice of the Peace Courts (Sheriffdom of South Strathclyde, Dumfries and Galloway) etc. Order 2009 (S.S.I. 2009 No. 332)
- The Environmental Impact Assessment and Natural Habitats (Extraction of Minerals by Marine Dredging) (Scotland) Amendment Regulations 2009 (S.S.I. 2009 No. 333)
- The Judiciary and Courts (Scotland) Act 2008 (Consequential Modifications) Order 2009 (S.S.I. 2009 No. 334)
- The Rural Development Contracts (Rural Priorities) (Scotland) Amendment (No. 3) Regulations 2009 (S.S.I. 2009 No. 335)
- The Pollution Prevention and Control (Scotland) Amendment Regulations 2009 (S.S.I. 2009 No. 336)
- The Protection of Vulnerable Groups (Scotland) Act 2007 (Transitory Provisions in Consequence of the Safeguarding Vulnerable Groups Act 2006) (No. 2) Order 2009 (S.S.I. 2009 No. 337)
- The Sea Fishing (Enforcement of Community Quota and Third Country Fishing Measures and Restriction on Days at Sea) (Scotland) Amendment Order 2009 (S.S.I. 2009 No. 338)
- The Welfare of Animals (Transport) (Scotland) Amendment Regulations 2009 (S.S.I. 2009 No. 339)
- The Regulation of Investigatory Powers (Prescription of Offices, Ranks and Positions) (Scotland) Amendment Order 2009 (S.S.I. 2009 No. 340)
- Climate Change (Scotland) Act 2009 (Commencement No. 1) Order 2009 (SSI 2009/341 (C. 27))
- The Mutual Recognition of Criminal Financial Penalties in the European Union (Scotland) Order 2009 (S.S.I. 2009 No. 342)
- The Town and Country Planning (Miscellaneous Amendments) (Scotland) (No. 2) Regulations 2009 (S.S.I. 2009 No. 343)
- The Planning etc. (Scotland) Act 2006 (Development Planning) (Saving, Transitional and Consequential Provisions) Amendment (No. 2) Order 2009 (S.S.I. 2009 No. 344)
- Act of Adjournal (Criminal Procedure Rules Amendment No. 5) (Miscellaneous) 2009 (S.S.I. 2009 No. 345)
- The A76 Trunk Road (Glenairlie Improvement) (Temporary Prohibition of Traffic, Temporary Prohibition of Overtaking and Temporary Speed Restriction) (No.2) Order 2009 (S.S.I. 2009 No. 346)
- The A80 Trunk Road (A80 Westfield Link Road to Auchenkilns) (Temporary Prohibition of Traffic) Order 2009 (S.S.I. 2009 No. 347)
- The A92 Trunk Road (Scott Fyffe Roundabout) (30 mph Speed Limit) Order 2009 (S.S.I. 2009 No. 348)
- The Regulation of Care (Fitness of Employees in Relation to Care Services) (Scotland) (No. 2) Amendment Regulations 2009 (S.S.I. 2009 No. 349)
- The Regulation of Care (Social Service Workers) (Scotland) Amendment Order 2009 (S.S.I. 2009 No. 350)
- The A68 Trunk Road (St Boswells) (40 mph Speed Limit) Order 2009 (S.S.I. 2009 No. 351)
- The Health Board Elections (Scotland) Regulations 2009 (S.S.I. 2009 No. 352)
- The Pensions Appeal Tribunals (Scotland) (Amendment) Rules 2009 (S.S.I. 2009 No. 353)
- The A96 Trunk Road (Wittet Drive to Oakwood) (Temporary Prohibition of Specified Turns) Order 2009 (S.S.I. 2009 No. 354)
- The A80 Trunk Road (Dennyloanhead to Moodiesburn) (Temporary Width Restriction of Traffic) Order 2009 (S.S.I. 2009 No. 355)
- The A80 Trunk Road (A80 Westfield Link Road) (Temporary 30 mph Speed Restriction) Order 2009 (S.S.I. 2009 No. 356)
- The A75 Trunk Road (Hardgrove to Kinmount Improvement) (Trunking and Detrunking) Order 2009 (S.S.I. 2009 No. 357)
- The A75 Trunk Road (Hardgrove to Kinmount Improvement) (Side Roads) Order 2009 (S.S.I. 2009 No. 358)
- The Mental Health Tribunal for Scotland (Appointment of Medical Members) Amendment Regulations 2009 (S.S.I. 2009 No. 359)
- The South West Unit Trunk Roads Area (Temporary Prohibitions of Traffic, Temporary Prohibitions of Overtaking and Temporary Speed Restrictions) (No.10) Order 2009 (S.S.I. 2009 No. 360)
- The South East Unit Trunk Roads Area (Temporary Prohibitions of Traffic, Temporary Prohibitions of Overtaking and Temporary Speed Restrictions) (No.10) Order 2009 (S.S.I. 2009 No. 361)
- The North West Unit Trunk Roads Area (Temporary Prohibitions of Traffic, Temporary Prohibitions of Overtaking and Temporary Speed Restrictions) (No.10) Order 2009 (S.S.I. 2009 No. 362)
- The North East Unit Trunk Roads Area (Temporary Prohibitions of Traffic, Temporary Prohibitions of Overtaking and Temporary Speed Restrictions) (No.10) Order 2009 (S.S.I. 2009 No. 363)
- The A96 Trunk Road (Fochabers to Mosstodloch Bypass) (Temporary Prohibition of Traffic, Temporary Prohibition of Overtaking, Temporary Prohibition of Waiting and Loading and Temporary Speed Restriction) Order 2009 (S.S.I. 2009 No. 364)
- Act of Sederunt (Child Support Rules) (Amendment) 2009 (S.S.I. 2009 No. 365)
- The A9 Trunk Road (Kincraig to Dalraddy) (Side Roads) Order 2009 (S.S.I. 2009 No. 366)
- The A78 Trunk Road (Inverkip Street, Greenock) (Prohibition of Waiting, Prohibition of Loading/Unloading and Prohibition of Specified Turns) Order 2009 (S.S.I. 2009 No. 367)
- The Glasgow City Council Area and North Lanarkshire Council Area (Cardowan by Stepps) Boundaries Amendment Order 2009 (S.S.I. 2009 No. 368)
- The Bankruptcy and Diligence etc. (Scotland) Act 2007 (Commencement No. 5 and Transitional) Order 2009 (S.S.I. 2009 No. 369 (C. 28))
- The A96 Trunk Road (Church Road, Keith) (Special Event) (Temporary Prohibition of Traffic) Order 2009 (S.S.I. 2009 No. 370)
- The Railway Closures (Exclusion) Scotland Order 2009 (S.S.I. 2009 No. 371)
- The Police (Scotland) Amendment Regulations 2009 (S.S.I. 2009 No. 372)
- The Feed (Specified Undesirable Substances) (Scotland) Regulations 2009 (S.S.I. 2009 No. 373)
- The Food Labelling (Declaration of Allergens) (Scotland) Regulations 2009 (S.S.I. 2009 No. 374)
- The Protection of Vulnerable Groups (Scotland) Act 2007 (Transitory Provisions in Consequence of the Safeguarding Vulnerable Groups (Northern Ireland) Order 2007) Order 2009 (S.S.I. 2009 No. 375)
- The Rural Payments (Appeals) (Scotland) Regulations 2009 (S.S.I. 2009 No. 376)
- The Glasgow Commonwealth Games Act 2008 (Commencement No. 2) Order 2009 (S.S.I. 2009 No. 377 (C. 29))
- The Planning (Control of Major–Accident Hazards) (Scotland) Regulations 2009 (S.S.I. 2009 No. 378)
- Act of Sederunt (Fees of Sheriff Officers) (Diligence) 2009 (S.S.I. 2009 No. 379)
- The Campbeltown Legalised Police Cells (Declaration and Revocation) Rules 2009 (S.S.I. 2009 No. 380)
- The National Assistance (Assessment of Resources) Amendment (No. 2) (Scotland) Regulations 2009 (S.S.I. 2009 No. 381)
- Act of Sederunt (Money Attachment Rules) 2009 (S.S.I. 2009 No. 382)
- Act of Sederunt (Fees of Messengers-at-Arms) (Diligence) 2009 (S.S.I. 2009 No. 383)
- The A8 Trunk Road (Main Street, Greenock and Kincaid Gate West Access/Egress) (Temporary Prohibition of Specified Turns) Order 2009 (S.S.I. 2009 No. 384)
- The A702 Trunk Road (West Linton) (30 mph Speed Limit) Variation and West Linton Primary School (Part-time 20 mph Speed Limit) Variation Order 2009 (S.S.I. 2009 No. 385)
- The Teaching Council (Scotland) Act 1965 Modification Order 2009 (S.S.I. 2009 No. 386)
- Act of Sederunt (Rules of the Court of Session Amendment No. 8) (Motions Procedure) 2009 (S.S.I. 2009 No. 387)
- The Public Health etc. (Scotland) Act 2008 (Sunbed) Regulations 2009 (S.S.I. 2009 No. 388)
- The A68 Trunk Road (Old Dalkeith Road, Midlothian) (Redetermination of Means of Exercise of Public Right of Passage) Order 2009 (S.S.I. 2009 No. 389)
- The Public Appointments and Public Bodies etc. (Scotland) Act 2003 (Amendment of Specified Authorities) Order 2009 (S.S.I. 2009 No. 390)
- The Common Agricultural Policy (Single Farm Payment and Support Schemes and Cross-Compliance) (Scotland) Amendment Regulations 2009 (S.S.I. 2009 No. 391)
- The Home Energy Assistance Scheme (Scotland) Amendment Regulations 2009 (S.S.I. 2009 No. 392)
- The Flood Risk Management (Scotland) Act 2009 (Commencement No. 1 and Transitional and Savings Provisions) Order 2009 (S.S.I. 2009 No. 393 (C. 30))
- The Specified Animal Pathogens (Scotland) Amendment Order 2009 (S.S.I. 2009 No. 394)
- The Diligence against Earnings (Variation) (No. 2) (Scotland) Regulations 2009 (S.S.I. 2009 No. 395)
- The Diligence (Scotland) Amendment Regulations 2009 (S.S.I. 2009 No. 396)
- The A9 Trunk Road (Moy) (Side Roads) Order 2009 (S.S.I. 2009 No. 397)
- The A80 Trunk Road (Castlecary Interchange) (Temporary Prohibition of Specified Turns) (No.2) Order 2009 (S.S.I. 2009 No. 398)
- The A75 Trunk Road (Dunragit Bypass) (Trunking and Detrunking) Order 2009 (S.S.I. 2009 No. 399)
- The A75 Trunk Road (Dunragit Bypass) (Side Roads) Order 2009 (S.S.I. 2009 No. 400)

== 401-455 ==
- The A7 Trunk Road (Selkirk to Lindean Junction) (Redetermination of Means of Exercise of Public Right of Passage) Order 2009 (S.S.I. 2009 No. 401)
- Act of Sederunt (Amendment of the Act of Sederunt (Sheriff Court Rules) (Miscellaneous Amendments) 2009) 2009 (S.S.I. 2009 No. 402)
- Act of Sederunt (Debt Arrangement and Attachment (Scotland) Act 2002) Amendment 2009 (S.S.I. 2009 No. 403)
- The Public Health etc. (Scotland) Act 2008 (Commencement No. 3, Consequential Provisions and Revocation) Order 2009 (S.S.I. 2009 No. 404 (C. 31))
- The A702 Trunk Road (Coulter) (30 mph Speed Limit) and Coulter Primary School (Part-time 20 mph Speed Limit) Variation Order 2009 (S.S.I. 2009 No. 405)
- The A737 Trunk Road (Beith Bypass, Head Street Junction) Order 2009 (S.S.I. 2009 No. 406)
- The A737 Trunk Road (Beith Bypass, Head Street Junction) (Side Roads) Order 2009 (S.S.I. 2009 No. 407)
- The A9 Trunk Road (Crubenmore Dual Carriageway Northern Extension) (Side Roads) Order 2009 (S.S.I. 2009 No. 408)
- The Justice of the Peace Courts (Sheriffdom of North Strathclyde) etc. Amendment Order 2009 (S.S.I. 2009 No. 409)
- The Law Applicable to Contractual Obligations (Scotland) Regulations 2009 (S.S.I. 2009 No. 410)
- The Rural Development Contracts (Rural Priorities) (Scotland) Amendment (No. 4) Regulations 2009 (S.S.I. 2009 No. 411)
- The Less Favoured Area Support Scheme (Scotland) Amendment Regulations 2009 (S.S.I. 2009 No. 412)
- The Sea Fishing (Prohibition on the Removal of Shark Fins) (Scotland) Amendment Order 2009 (S.S.I. 2009 No. 413)
- The Sheep and Goats (Records, Identification and Movement) (Scotland) Order 2009 (S.S.I. 2009 No. 414)
- The Sheep and Goats (Identification and Traceability) (Scotland) Revocation Regulations 2009 (S.S.I. 2009 No. 415)
- The Zoonoses and Animal By-Products (Fees) (Scotland) Amendment Regulations 2009 (S.S.I. 2009 No. 416)
- The Control of Salmonella in Turkey Flocks (Scotland) Order 2009 (S.S.I. 2009 No. 417)
- The Wildlife and Countryside Act 1981 (Variation of Schedule 4) (Scotland) Order 2009 (S.S.I. 2009 No. 418)
- The Wildlife and Countryside (Registration and Ringing of Certain Captive Birds) (Scotland) Regulations 2009 (S.S.I. 2009 No. 419)
- The Water Environment (Groundwater and Priority Substances) (Scotland) Regulations 2009 (S.S.I. 2009 No. 420)
- The South West Unit Trunk Roads Area (Temporary Prohibitions of Traffic, Temporary Prohibitions of Overtaking and Temporary Speed Restrictions) (No.11) Order 2009 (S.S.I. 2009 No. 421)
- The South East Unit Trunk Roads Area (Temporary Prohibitions of Traffic, Temporary Prohibitions of Overtaking and Temporary Speed Restrictions) (No.11) Order 2009 (S.S.I. 2009 No. 422)
- The North West Unit Trunk Roads Area (Temporary Prohibitions of Traffic, Temporary Prohibitions of Overtaking and Temporary Speed Restrictions) (No.11) Order 2009 (S.S.I. 2009 No. 423)
- The North East Unit Trunk Roads Area (Temporary Prohibitions of Traffic, Temporary Prohibitions of Overtaking and Temporary Speed Restrictions) (No.11) Order 2009 (S.S.I. 2009 No. 424)
- The A77 Trunk Road (Dalrymple Street, Girvan) (Special Event) (Temporary Prohibition of Traffic) Order 2009 (S.S.I. 2009 No. 425)
- The Materials and Articles in Contact with Food (Scotland) Amendment Regulations 2009 (S.S.I. 2009 No. 426)
- The Food for Particular Nutritional Uses (Addition of Substances for Specific Nutritional Purposes) (Scotland) Regulations 2009 (S.S.I. 2009 No. 427)
- The Public Contracts and Utilities Contracts (Scotland) Amendment Regulations 2009 (S.S.I. 2009 No. 428)
- The Adoption and Children (Scotland) Act 2007 (Modification of Subordinate Legislation) Order 2009 (S.S.I. 2009 No. 429)
- The M73 Trunk Road (Gartcosh to Mollinsburn) (Temporary Prohibition of Traffic) Order 2009 (S.S.I. 2009 No. 430)
- The M80/A80 Trunk Road (Hornshill to Haggs) (Temporary Prohibition of Traffic) Order 2009 (S.S.I. 2009 No. 431)
- The Criminal Proceedings etc. (Reform) (Scotland) Act 2007 (Commencement No. 8) Order 2009 (S.S.I. 2009 No. 432 (C. 32))
- The Health Boards (Membership and Elections) (Scotland) Act 2009 (Commencement No. 2) Order 2009 (S.S.I. 2009 No. 433 (C. 33))
- The Budget (Scotland) Act 2009 Amendment Order 2009 (S.S.I. 2009 No. 434)
- The Food Enzymes (Scotland) Regulations 2009 (S.S.I. 2009 No. 435)
- The Food Additives (Scotland) Regulations 2009 (S.S.I. 2009 No. 436)
- The Food (Jelly Mini-Cups) (Emergency Control) (Scotland) Regulations 2009 (S.S.I. 2009 No. 437)
- The Food Supplements, Vitamins, Minerals and Other Substances (Scotland) Regulations 2009 (S.S.I. 2009 No. 438)
- The Public Contracts and Utilities Contracts (Scotland) Amendment (Amendment) Regulations 2009 (S.S.I. 2009 No. 439)
- The INSPIRE (Scotland) Regulations 2009 (S.S.I. 2009 No. 440)
- The Crime (International Co-operation) Act 2003 (Designation of Participating Countries) (Scotland) (No. 3) Order 2009 (S.S.I. 2009 No. 441)
- The Angus Council Area and Dundee City Council Area (Fithiebank) Boundaries Amendment Order 2009 (S.S.I. 2009 No. 442)
- The Shetland Islands Regulated Fishery (Scotland) Order 2009 (S.S.I. 2009 No. 443)
- The Inshore Fishing (Prohibition of Fishing for Cockles) (Western Isles) (Scotland) Order 2009 (S.S.I. 2009 No. 444)
- The Tuberculosis (Scotland) Amendment Order 2009 (S.S.I. 2009 No. 445)
- The Official Feed and Food Controls (Scotland) Regulations 2009 (S.S.I. 2009 No. 446)
- The Action Programme for Nitrate Vulnerable Zones (Scotland) Amendment Regulations 2009 (S.S.I. 2009 No. 447)
- The Scottish Criminal Cases Review Commission (Permitted Disclosure of Information) Order 2009 (S.S.I. 2009 No. 448)
- Act of Sederunt (Child Care and Maintenance Rules) Amendment (No.2) 2009 (S.S.I. 2009 No. 449)
- Act of Sederunt (Rules of the Court of Session Amendment No. 9) (Miscellaneous) 2009 (S.S.I. 2009 No. 450)
- The North East Unit Trunk Roads Area (Temporary Prohibitions of Traffic, Temporary Prohibitions of Overtaking and Temporary Speed Restrictions) (No.12) Order 2009 (S.S.I. 2009 No. 451)
- The North West Unit Trunk Roads Area (Temporary Prohibitions of Traffic, Temporary Prohibitions of Overtaking and Temporary Speed Restrictions) (No.12) Order 2009 (S.S.I. 2009 No. 452)
- The South East Unit Trunk Roads Area (Temporary Prohibitions of Traffic, Temporary Prohibitions of Overtaking and Temporary Speed Restrictions) (No.12) Order 2009 (S.S.I. 2009 No. 453)
- The South West Unit Trunk Roads Area (Temporary Prohibitions of Traffic, Temporary Prohibitions of Overtaking and Temporary Speed Restrictions) (No.12) Order 2009 (S.S.I. 2009 No. 454)
- The A702 Trunk Road (Biggar High Street) (Special Event) (Temporary Prohibition of Traffic) Order 2009 (S.S.I. 2009 No. 455)
