= Climate Change (Scotland) Act 2009 =

Act of the Scottish Parliament

Climate Change (Scotland) Act 2009 (Note: Section 100(1).)
- Act of the Scottish Parliament
- Scottish Parliament
- Long title: An Act of the Scottish Parliament to set a target for the year 2050, an interim target for the year 2020, and to provide for annual targets, for the reduction of greenhouse gas emissions; to provide about the giving of advice to the Scottish Ministers relating to climate change; to confer power on Ministers to impose climate change duties on public bodies; to make further provision about mitigation of and adaptation to climate change; to make provision about energy efficiency, including provision enabling council tax discounts; to make provision about the reduction and recycling of waste; and for connected purposes.
- Citation: 2009 asp 12
- Territorial extent: Scotland

Dates
- Royal assent: 4 August 2009
- Commencement: various (Note: Section 100(2)–(5).)
Other legislation
Amends	Town and Country Planning (Scotland) Act 1997
Amended by	Climate Change (Emissions Reduction Targets) (Scotland) Act 2019

Status: Amended

Text of statute as originally enacted

Text of the Climate Change (Scotland) Act 2009 as in force today (including any amendments) within the United Kingdom, from legislation.gov.uk.

The Climate Change (Scotland) Act 2009 (asp 12) is an act of the Scottish Parliament concerning the setting of emissions reductions targets and certain other matters.

== History ==
=== Role in the formation of the first Scottish National Party government ===
In May 2007 the Scottish Green Party supported Alex Salmond's first election as First Minister, and his subsequent appointments of ministers, in return for early tabling of the climate change bill and the SNP nominating a Green MSP to chair a parliamentary committee.

=== Consultation ===
The government consulted on the legislation and received more than 21,000 responses. The bill was announced in December 2008.

== Parliamentary passage ==
The bill was passed unanimously by the Scottish Parliament on 24 June 2009 and received royal assent on 4 August.

== Provisions ==
Provisions are included in the act for the creation of a Scottish Committee on Climate Change, as at present the only advisory body is the UK-wide Committee on Climate Change. Ministers in parliament must now report on the progress of these targets. As of January 2011, public sector bodies in Scotland must comply with new guidelines set out by the Scottish Government.

The act acknowledged transport as a major source of emissions.

The act requires that a 42% cut in greenhouse gas emissions by 2020 and 80% by 2050.

Under an amendment to the act carried, introduced by Patrick Harvie, the legislation prevented the Scottish Government from building a new coal-fired power station at Hunterston.

The act amended the Title Conditions (Scotland) Act 2003, by inserting a new section creating an additional personal real burden, known as a "climate change burden", which conveyancers can use in their work.

Until 2024, the legislation required the setting of annual interim targets.

== Amendments ==
Climate Change (Emissions Reduction Targets) (Scotland) Act 2019
- Act of the Scottish Parliament
- Scottish Parliament
- Long title: An Act of the Scottish Parliament to amend the Climate Change (Scotland) Act 2009 to make provision setting targets for the reduction of greenhouse gases emissions and to make provision about advice, plans and reports in relation to those targets, with the objective of Scotland contributing appropriately to the world's efforts to deliver on the Paris Agreement reached at the 21st Conference of the Parties of the United Nations Framework Convention on Climate Change.
- Citation: 2019 asp 15
- Introduced by: Roseanna Cunningham MSP

Dates
- Royal assent: 31 October 2019

Status: Current legislation

Text of the Climate Change (Scotland) Act 2009 as in force today (including any amendments) within the United Kingdom, from legislation.gov.uk.

The act was amended by the Climate Change (Emissions Reduction Targets) (Scotland) Act 2019 (asp 15) to remove the target of a reduction in greenhouse gas emissions of 75% for 2030, compared to 1990 levels.

Climate Change (Emissions Reduction Targets) (Scotland) Act 2024
- Act of the Scottish Parliament
- Scottish Parliament
- Long title: An Act of the Scottish Parliament to modify the Climate Change (Scotland) Act 2009 in relation to the targets for the reduction of greenhouse gas emissions; and for connected purposes.
- Citation: 2024 asp 15
- Introduced by: Gillian Martin MSP

Dates
- Royal assent: 22 November 2024

Status: Current legislation

Text of the Climate Change (Scotland) Act 2009 as in force today (including any amendments) within the United Kingdom, from legislation.gov.uk.

The Climate Change (Emissions Reduction Targets) (Scotland) Act 2024 (asp 15) replaced the setting of interim targets with a system measuring emissions every five years.

== Secondary legislation ==
Eight pieces of secondary legislation have been made under the act:

1. Climate Change (Scotland) Act 2009 (Commencement No. 1) Order 2009 (SSI 2009/341)
2. Carbon Accounting Scheme (Scotland) Regulations 2010 (SSI 2010/216)
3. Climate Change (Limit on Carbon Units) (Scotland) Order 2010 (SSI 2010/217), for the period 2010–2012, includes a specification that certain carbon units associated with the European Union Emission Trading Scheme do not count towards the limit for that period
4. Climate Change (International Aviation and Shipping) (Scotland) Order 2010 (SSI 2010/218), describes the method for calculating emissions of greenhouse gases from international aviation and shipping that are attributable to Scotland
5. Climate Change (Annual Targets) (Scotland) Order 2010 (SSI 2010/359), for the period 2010-2022
6. Waste Information (Scotland) Regulations 2010 (SSI 2010/435), introduce a statutory obligation on bodies to provide the Scottish Environmental Protection Agency with data upon request
7. Climate Change (Annual Targets) (Scotland) Order 2011 (SSI 2011/353), for the period 2023-2027
8. Climate Change (Limit on Carbon Units) (Scotland) Order 2011 (SSI 2011/440)

== See also ==
- Climate change in Scotland
- Environment of Scotland
- List of acts of the Scottish Parliament from 1999
