= Gender Representation on Public Boards (Scotland) Act 2018 =

Act of the Scottish Parliament

Gender Representation on Public Boards (Scotland) Act 2018 (Note: Section 14.)
- Act of the Scottish Parliament
- Scottish Parliament
- Long title: An Act of the Scottish Parliament to make provision about gender representation on boards of Scottish public authorities.
- Citation: 2018 asp 4
- Introduced by: Shirley-Anne Somerville MSP
- Territorial extent: Scotland

Dates
- Royal assent: 8 March 2018
- Commencement: 1 December 2018 (in part); 29 May 2020 (in part); (Note: Section 13.)

Other legislation
- Amended by: Scottish Crown Estate Act 2019; Scottish Elections (Reform) Act 2020

Status: Amended

History of passage through the Parliament

Text of statute as originally enacted

Revised text of statute as amended

Text of the Gender Representation on Public Boards (Scotland) Act 2018 as in force today (including any amendments) within the United Kingdom, from legislation.gov.uk.

The Gender Representation on Public Boards (Scotland) Act 2018 (asp 4) is an act of the Scottish Parliament which received royal assent on 9 March 2018.

The act is designed to make more public boards in Scotland more diverse in terms of gender to be more representative of Scotland, requiring that they encourage applications from women. The Act requires that when there is a vacancy, there must be more than one candidate and at least one candidate must be a woman and one candidate must not be a woman.

== Gender Representation on Public Boards (Amendment) (Scotland) Act 2024 ==
Originally, the act specified that the definition of a woman "includes a person who has the protected characteristic of gender reassignment (within the meaning of section 7 of the Equality Act 2010) if, and only if, the person is living as a woman and is proposing to undergo, is undergoing or has undergone a process (or part of a process) for the purpose of becoming female."

For Women Scotland (FWS) initially won a judicial review against the act: the definition of "woman" was deemed to be outside of the devolved matters of the Scottish Parliament. This was reversed upon appeal to the Court of Session on the basis that the definition of sex was "not limited to biological or birth sex".

Gender Representation on Public Boards (Amendment) (Scotland) Act 2024
- Act of the Scottish Parliament
- Scottish Parliament
- Long title: An Act of the Scottish Parliament to make provision enabling the support of agriculture, rural communities and the rural economy through the creation of a framework for that support; to make provision for continuing professional development for those involved in agriculture and related industries, to make provision in relation to the welfare and identification of animals, to repeal spent and superseded agricultural enactments; and for connected purposes.
- Citation: 2024 asp 12

Dates
- Royal assent: 1 August 2024

Text of statute as originally enacted

Text of the Gender Representation on Public Boards (Amendment) (Scotland) Act 2024 as in force today (including any amendments) within the United Kingdom, from legislation.gov.uk.

After the Gender Representation on Public Boards (Amendment) (Scotland) Act 2024 (asp 12) was passed, the definition of "woman" was removed in favour of using the definition from the Equality Act 2010. Statutory guidance also held that the Equality Act's definition of "man" and "woman" included people with who had undergone a recognized gender transition under the Gender Recognition Act 2004. FWS filed for a second judicial review that challenged this guidance, which was won by the Scottish Ministers. After FWS were declined an appeal, the case was taken to the Supreme Court of the United Kingdom. In April 2025, the court ruled in For Women Scotland Ltd v The Scottish Ministers that the Equality Act's definition of "man", "woman, and "sex" were in reference to "biological sex".
