= Graeme Armstrong (author) =

Scottish author (born 1991)

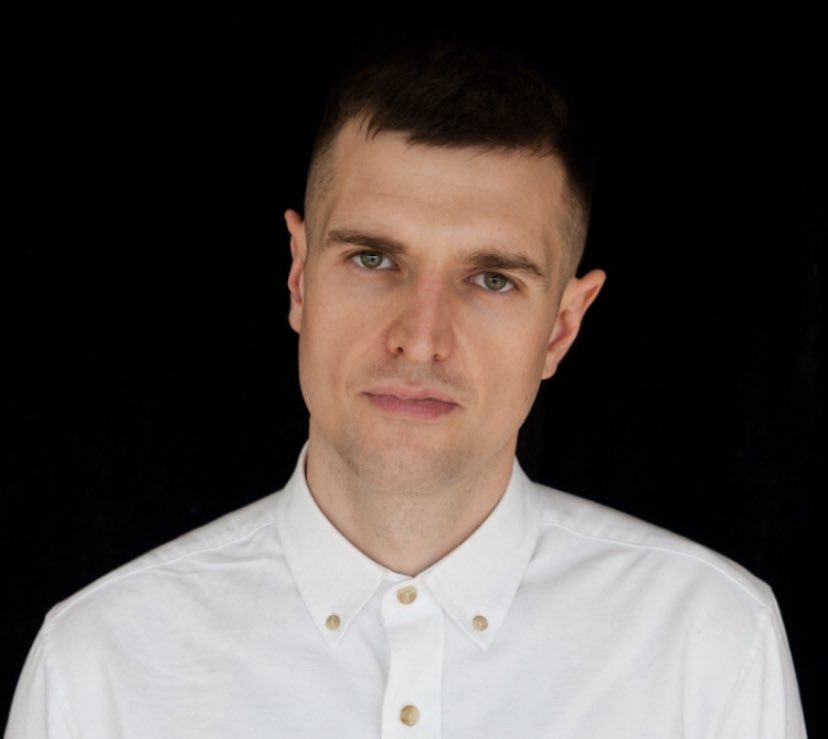
- Born: 1991 (age 34–35); Airdrie, Scotland
- Education: University of Stirling
- Writing career
- Notable awards: Betty Trask Award (2021); Somerset Maugham Award (2021); Granta Best of Young British Novelists (2023)

Graeme Armstrong (born 1991) is a Scottish author best known for his debut novel, The Young Team. The novel won the Betty Trask Award, Somerset Maugham Award, and was named 'Scots Book of the Year' in 2021. The Young Team is currently being adapted for television by Synchronicity Films and has been commissioned as a BBC drama production as of March, 2025. Armstrong has been announced as lead screenwriter.

In 2023, Granta included Armstrong on their 'Best of Young British Novelists' list, an honour presented every decade to the twenty most significant British novelists under forty years old.

Armstrong's second novel, Raveheart, was published by 4th Estate (imprint) at HarperCollins in June 2026. It is being adapted for screen by Warp Films, (This Is England, Dead Man's Shoes and Adolescence) and is a dystopian rave comedy.

== Biography ==
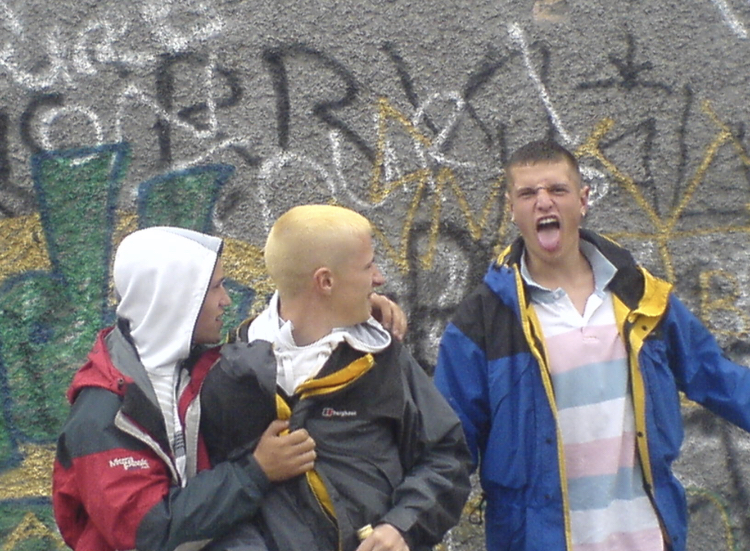
Armstrong (right) as a young gang member in Airdrie, 2006

Armstrong is from Airdrie, Scotland. As a teenager he was involved in North Lanarkshire's 'young team' territorial gang culture as a member of the Young Mavis, from Glenmavis. At fourteen, he was expelled from Airdrie Academy and began attending Coatbridge High School, where he joined another gang, the Lang El Toi (LL TOI) from Langloan, Coatbridge.

Armstrong is a lifelong supporter of Scottish football side Rangers F.C.

Aged sixteen, following the deaths of three friends by heroin overdose and after reading Trainspotting by Irvine Welsh, Armstrong pursued a route of higher education, and began to break away from gang life. During his time in gangs, he struggled with alcohol abuse, drug addiction and violence. Armstrong "stopped taking drugs on Christmas Day 2012" and speaks candidly about having a Christian faith. His experiences inspired his debut novel, The Young Team, a work of social realism, written in West Central Scots language.

In 2013, Armstrong received a 2:1 Bachelor of Arts undergraduate degree in English Studies from the University of Stirling and returned there to complete a Master of Letters in Creative Writing, graduating with Merit in 2015. As of 2023, he is currently undertaking a PhD between the University of Strathclyde and The University of Glasgow.

In 2021, Armstrong wrote and appeared in a short film for the Edinburgh International Book Festival Infectious Nihilism and Small Metallic Pieces of Hope directed by James Price. Later that year, he presented a BBC documentary, Scotland the Rave with IWC Media, subsequently nominated for a BAFTA Scotland and Royal Television Society Scotland awards.

During the Edinburgh International Book Festival 2023, Armstrong hosted James Kelman and spoke around difficulties in working-class representation, "cultural banishment" and Kelman's new work, 'God's Teeth and Other Phenomena'.

Armstrong wrote and presented a three-part BBC Scotland documentary series, Street Gangs exploring current Scottish gang culture, including the recent impact of social media, Drill music / Roadman culture, and his lived experience as an ex-gang member, which aired on television in October 2023 and was featured on BBC iPlayer.

Armstrong is an ambassador for The Hope Collective, a London-based anti-violence organisation, formed originally to support the 20th anniversary legacy campaign for Damilola Taylor.

In June 2024, New College Lanarkshire inducted Armstrong as an honorary lecturer to celebrate the launch of their Undergraduate School in partnership with the University of the West of Scotland, offering the first degree level study in North Lanarkshire, alongside others including author and broadcaster Damian Barr, a fellow North Lanarkshire native.

Later in 2024, Armstrong joined a panel of experts at the Convention of Scottish Local Authorities (COSLA) national conference alongside Karyn McCluskey and Maureen McKenna OBE to discuss early intervention and prevention, where First Minister of Scotland John Swinney also delivered an address.

As of 2025, Armstrong runs a violence prevention educational event programme, 'Street Belonging', for school pupils, leaders and in the prison estate across Scotland, working with organisations such as Community Justice Scotland and Medics Against Violence. He is an associate for the Children and Young People's Centre for Justice and currently sits on the Strategic Advisory Board for the Scottish Violence Reduction Unit.

== Awards and honours ==
In April 2023, Granta included Armstrong on their "Best of Young British Novelists" list, an honour presented every ten years "to the twenty most significant British novelists under forty."

Year	Title	Award	Category	Result	Ref.
2021	The Young Team	Betty Trask Prize and Awards	Betty Trask Award	Won	
2021	The Young Team	Scots Language Awards	Scots Book of the Year	Won	
2021	The Young Team	Saltire Society Literary Awards	Scottish First Book of the Year	Shortlisted	
2021	The Young Team	Somerset Maugham Award	—	Won	
2022	Scotland the Rave	BAFTA Scotland	Single Documentary	Nominated	
2022	Scotland the Rave	RTS Scotland	Documentary and Specialist Factual	Nominated	
2022	The Cloud Factory	Granta Best of Young British Novelists	—	Won	

== Publication ==
=== Novels ===
- The Young Team (Picador, 2020)
- Raveheart (4th Estate, 2026)

=== Short works ===
- Landit (The Middle of a Sentence: Short Prose Anthology, The Common Breath, 2020)
- The Jakit, Mysticism n PPK Resurrection (Scottish Book Trust, 2022)
- The Cloud Factory (Granta, 2023)

=== Translated ===
- La Gang - Italian translation of The Young Team (Guanda, 2021)
- The Young Team - Spanish translation (Automática Editorial, 2022)

== Filmography ==
- Scotland the Rave – single documentary (IWC Media, 2021)
- Street Gangs – documentary series (Tern Media, 2023)
