= List of acts of the Scottish Parliament from 2016 =

This is a list of acts of the Scottish Parliament passed in 2016. Acts of the Scottish Parliament are enacted by the Scottish Parliament, which has legislative authority over devolved matters in relation to Scotland under the authority of the Scotland Act 1998. Acts are cited by calendar year, in the same fashion as acts of Parliament of the United Kingdom. Each act passed in a respective year is numbered consecutively with Arabic numerals, following the prefix "asp".

22 acts of the Scottish Parliament were passed in 2016.

indicates that an act has been transcribed on Wikisource, indicates that an act is available to view at legislation.gov.uk, and indicates the location of the original act in the Parliamentary Archives.

== Acts of the Scottish Parliament ==
Short title	Citation	Royal assent
Long title
Criminal Justice (Scotland) Act 2016	2016 asp 1	13 January 2016
An Act of the Scottish Parliament to make provision about criminal justice including as to police powers and rights of suspects and as to criminal evidence, procedure and sentencing; to establish the Police Negotiating Board for Scotland; and for connected purposes.
Inquiries into Fatal Accidents and Sudden Deaths etc. (Scotland) Act 2016	2016 asp 2	14 January 2016
An Act of the Scottish Parliament to make provision for the holding of public inquiries in respect of certain deaths.
Smoking Prohibition (Children in Motor Vehicles) (Scotland) Act 2016	2016 asp 3	21 January 2016
An Act of the Scottish Parliament to prohibit smoking in private motor vehicles in the presence of children, subject to limited exceptions; and for connected purposes.
Interests of Members of the Scottish Parliament (Amendment) Act 2016	2016 asp 4	21 January 2016
An Act of the Scottish Parliament to amend the Interests of Members of the Scottish Parliament Act 2006 (Note: Interests of Members of the Scottish Parliament Act 2006 (asp 12)) and the Political Parties, Elections and Referendums Act 2000. (Note: Political Parties, Elections and Referendums Act 2000 (c. 41))
Apologies (Scotland) Act 2016	2016 asp 5	23 February 2016
An Act of the Scottish Parliament to make provision for the effect of an apology in certain legal proceedings.
National Galleries of Scotland Act 2016	2016 asp 6	23 February 2016
An Act of the Scottish Parliament to change the status of a piece of land currently within Princes Street Gardens so as to enable the City of Edinburgh Council to dispose of it to the National Galleries of Scotland and to provide for that same piece of land to cease to form part of Princes Street Gardens, thus disapplying section 22 of the Schedule to the City of Edinburgh District Council Order Confirmation Act 1991 (Note: City of Edinburgh District Council Order Confirmation Act 1991 (c. xix)) to that land.
Succession (Scotland) Act 2016	2016 asp 7	3 March 2016
An Act of the Scottish Parliament to make provision about succession; to make provision about liferents; to amend the Trusts (Scotland) Act 1921; (Note: Trusts (Scotland) Act 1921 (11 & 12 Geo. 5. c. 58)) and for connected purposes.
Education (Scotland) Act 2016	2016 asp 8	8 March 2016
An Act of the Scottish Parliament to make provision in relation to school education about priorities, objectives and reducing pupils' inequalities of outcome; to modify the Education (Additional Support for Learning) (Scotland) Act 2004 (Note: Education (Additional Support for Learning) (Scotland) Act 2004 (asp 4)) and section 70 of the Education (Scotland) Act 1980; (Note: Education (Scotland) Act 1980 (c. 44)) to make provision in relation to Gaelic medium education, the provision of school meals, the appointment of Chief Education Officers, the registration of independent schools and teachers in grant-aided schools and the standards of education and training of persons to be appointed as head teachers; to enable provision to be made requiring a minimum number of hours of school education to be provided; to enable provision to be made about school clothing grants; to extend the duty to provide early learning and childcare to certain children; and for connected purposes.
Carers (Scotland) Act 2016	2016 asp 9	9 March 2016
An Act of the Scottish Parliament to make provision about carers, including the identification of carers' needs for support through adult carer support plans and young carer statements; the provision of support to carers; the enabling of carer involvement in certain services; the preparation of local carer strategies; the establishment of information and advice services for carers; and for connected purposes.
Community Justice (Scotland) Act 2016	2016 asp 10	21 March 2016
An Act of the Scottish Parliament to make provision about community justice, including establishing a new national body to oversee community justice and introducing requirements in relation to the achievement of particular nationally and locally determined outcomes; and for connected purposes.
Land and Buildings Transaction Tax (Amendment) (Scotland) Act 2016	2016 asp 11	24 March 2016
An Act of the Scottish Parliament to amend the Land and Buildings Transaction Tax (Scotland) Act 2013 (Note: Land and Buildings Transaction Tax (Scotland) Act 2013 (asp 11)) to make provision about an additional amount of tax to be chargeable in respect of certain transactions relating to dwellings.
Budget (Scotland) Act 2016	2016 asp 12	30 March 2016
An Act of the Scottish Parliament to make provision, for financial year 2016/17, for the use of resources by the Scottish Administration and certain bodies whose expenditure is payable out of the Scottish Consolidated Fund, for the maximum amounts of borrowing by certain statutory bodies and for authorising the payment of sums out of the Fund; to make provision, for financial year 2017/18, for authorising the payment of sums out of the Fund on a temporary basis; and for connected purposes.
Scottish Elections (Dates) Act 2016	2016 asp 13	30 March 2016
An Act of the Scottish Parliament to make provision about the determination of the day of the poll at the first ordinary general election for membership of the Scottish Parliament after 2016 and about the year in which local government elections fall to be held.
Health (Tobacco, Nicotine etc. and Care) (Scotland) Act 2016	2016 asp 14	6 April 2016
An Act of the Scottish Parliament to make provision about tobacco, nicotine and related products, in particular to make provision about retailing, to amend the prohibition on smoking in certain areas and to control advertising and promotion; to make provision about a duty of candour following serious incidents in the course of providing care; to make provision about offences applying to ill-treatment or neglect where care is provided; and for connected purposes.
Higher Education Governance (Scotland) Act 2016	2016 asp 15	13 April 2016
An Act of the Scottish Parliament to make provision about the composition of and appointment to the governing bodies and academic boards of higher education institutions; and to revise provision about the academic freedom of various persons carrying out activities at higher education and certain other institutions.
Lobbying (Scotland) Act 2016	2016 asp 16	14 April 2016
An Act of the Scottish Parliament to make provision about lobbying, including provision for establishing and maintaining a lobbying register and the publication of a code of conduct.
Scottish Fiscal Commission Act 2016	2016 asp 17	14 April 2016
An Act of the Scottish Parliament to establish the Scottish Fiscal Commission and to provide for its functions.
Land Reform (Scotland) Act 2016	2016 asp 18	22 April 2016
An Act of the Scottish Parliament to make provision for a land rights and responsibilities statement; to establish the Scottish Land Commission, provide for its functions and the functions of the Land Commissioners and the Tenant Farming Commissioner; to make provision about access to, and provision of, information about owners and controllers of land; to make provision about engaging communities in decisions relating to land; to enable certain persons to buy land to further sustainable development; to make provision for non-domestic rates to be levied on shootings and deer forests; to make provision about the change of use of common good land; to make provision about the management of deer on land; to make provision about access rights to land; to amend the law on agricultural holdings to provide for new forms of agricultural tenancy, to remove the requirement to register before tenants of certain holdings can exercise a right to buy, to provide a new power of sale where a landlord is in breach of certain obligations, to provide about rent reviews, to expand the list of the persons to whom holdings can be assigned or bequeathed and to whom holdings can be transferred on intestacy and to make provision about landlords' objections to such successor tenants, to provide for certain holdings to be relinquished where landlords agree or assigned to persons new to or progressing in farming, to provide for a 3 year amnesty period in relation to certain improvements carried out by tenants, and to provide for notice of certain improvements proposed by landlords; and for connected purposes.
Private Housing (Tenancies) (Scotland) Act 2016	2016 asp 19	22 April 2016
An Act of the Scottish Parliament to make provision about private rented housing; in particular to establish a new type of tenancy to be known as a private residential tenancy.
Burial and Cremation (Scotland) Act 2016	2016 asp 20	28 April 2016
An Act of the Scottish Parliament to restate and amend the law relating to burial and cremation; to make provision about exhumation of human remains; to make provision in relation to the inspection and regulation of burial authorities, cremation authorities and funeral directors; to enable provision to be made for the licensing of funeral directors; and for connected purposes.
Bankruptcy (Scotland) Act 2016	2016 asp 21	28 April 2016
An Act of the Scottish Parliament to consolidate the Bankruptcy (Scotland) Act 1985, (Note: Bankruptcy (Scotland) Act 1985 (c. 66)) the Bankruptcy (Scotland) Act 1993, (Note: Bankruptcy (Scotland) Act 1993 (c. 6)) Part 1 of the Bankruptcy and Diligence etc. (Scotland) Act 2007, (Note: Bankruptcy and Diligence etc. (Scotland) Act 2007 (asp 3)) Part 2 of the Home Owner and Debtor Protection (Scotland) Act 2010, (Note: Home Owner and Debtor Protection (Scotland) Act 2010 (asp 6)) the Bankruptcy and Debt Advice (Scotland) Act 2014, (Note: Bankruptcy and Debt Advice (Scotland) Act 2014 (asp 11)) the Protected Trust Deeds (Scotland) Regulations 2013 (Note: Protected Trust Deeds (Scotland) Regulations 2013 (SSI 2013/318)) and related enactments.
Abusive Behaviour and Sexual Harm (Scotland) Act 2016	2016 asp 22	28 April 2016
An Act of the Scottish Parliament to make provision about abusive behaviour; and to make provision about sexual harm including provision about directions to be given to juries in sexual offence cases and provision about orders to prevent future sexual harm.

== See also ==
- List of acts of the Scottish Parliament
