= Lobbying Act =

Lobbying Act can refer to several pieces of legislation governing the lobbying of government:

- Lobbying Act (Canada) - Canadian law regarding lobbying of Parliament
- Lobbying Disclosure Act of 1995 - US law regarding lobbying of the US Congress
- Transparency of Lobbying, Non-party Campaigning and Trade Union Administration Act 2014 - UK law regarding political and lobbying activities
- Lobbying (Scotland) Act 2016 - Scottish law regarding lobbying
