= Scottish Parliamentary Standards Commissioner Act 2002 =

- Act of the Scottish Parliament
- Scottish Parliament
- Long title: An Act of the Scottish Parliament to establish a Scottish Parliamentary Standards Commissioner to investigate complaints about the conduct of members of the Parliament and to report upon the outcome of such investigations to the Parliament; and for connected purposes.
- Citation: 2002 asp 16
- Territorial extent: Scotland

Dates
- Royal assent: 30 July 2002

Other legislation
- Repealed by: Public Services Reform (Commissioner for Ethical Standards in Public Life in Scotland etc.) Order 2013
- Relates to: Scottish Parliamentary Commissions and Commissioners etc. Act 2010

Status: Partially repealed

History of passage through the Parliament

Text of statute as originally enacted

Text of the Scottish Parliamentary Standards Commissioner Act 2002 as in force today (including any amendments) within the United Kingdom, from legislation.gov.uk.

The Scottish Parliamentary Standards Commissioner Act 2002 (asp 16) is legislation that introduced arrangements for complaints against any Member of the Scottish Parliament to be investigated independently. It established the Scottish Parliamentary Standards Commissioner, who was given powers to summon witnesses and compel evidence.

== History ==
Parliament's Standards Committee published a bill to establish its own Standards Commissioner. The bill was introduced to Parliament on 4 February 2002. The bill set out that the commissioner would have the statutory power to summon witnesses and to compel the production of evidence.

The legislation was passed on 27 June 2002. It received royal assent on 30 July 2002.

== Transfer of powers ==
The Scottish Parliamentary Commissions and Commissioners etc. Act 2010 transferred the powers to the Commissioner for Ethical Standards in Public Life in Scotland. The post was abolished by the Public Services Reform (Commissioner for Ethical Standards in Public Life in Scotland etc.) Order 2013 (SSI 2013/197).
