= List of acts of the Scottish Parliament from 2013 =

This is a list of acts of the Scottish Parliament passed in 2013. Acts of the Scottish Parliament are enacted by the Scottish Parliament, which has legislative authority over devolved matters in relation to Scotland under the authority of the Scotland Act 1998. Acts are cited by calendar year, in the same fashion as acts of Parliament of the United Kingdom. Each act passed in a respective year is numbered consecutively with Arabic numerals, following the prefix "asp".

14 acts of the Scottish Parliament were passed in 2013.

indicates that an act has been transcribed on Wikisource, indicates that an act is available to view at legislation.gov.uk, and indicates the location of the original act in the Parliamentary Archives.

== Acts of the Scottish Parliament ==
Short title	Citation	Royal assent
Long title
Social Care (Self-directed Support) (Scotland) Act 2013	2013 asp 1	10 January 2013
An Act of the Scottish Parliament to enable local authorities to provide support to certain carers; to make provision about the way in which certain social care services are provided by local authorities; and for connected purposes.
Freedom of Information (Amendment) (Scotland) Act 2013	2013 asp 2	19 February 2013
An Act of the Scottish Parliament to amend provisions of the Freedom of Information (Scotland) Act 2002 (Note: Freedom of Information (Scotland) Act 2002 (asp 13)) relating to the designation of authorities, the effect of various exemptions and the time limit for certain proceedings.
Scottish Civil Justice Council and Criminal Legal Assistance Act 2013	2013 asp 3	5 March 2013
An Act of the Scottish Parliament to establish the Scottish Civil Justice Council; to make provision about contributions in respect of criminal legal assistance; and for connected purposes.
Budget (Scotland) Act 2013	2013 asp 4	13 March 2013
An Act of the Scottish Parliament to make provision, for financial year 2013/14, for the use of resources by the Scottish Administration and certain bodies whose expenditure is payable out of the Scottish Consolidated Fund, for the maximum amounts of borrowing by certain statutory bodies and for authorising the payment of sums out of the Fund; to make provision, for financial year 2014/15, for authorising the payment of sums out of the Fund on a temporary basis; and for connected purposes.
Water Resources (Scotland) Act 2013	2013 asp 5	9 April 2013
An Act of the Scottish Parliament to make provision for the development of Scotland's water resources; to bring large-scale water abstraction under Ministerial control; to extend Scottish Water's functions and to authorise grants and loans in favour of related bodies; to permit the taking of steps for the sake of water quality; to create contracts for certain non-domestic water and sewerage services; to protect the public sewerage network from harm and to allow for maintenance of private sewage works; to enable the making of water shortage orders; and for connected purposes.
High Hedges (Scotland) Act 2013	2013 asp 6	2 May 2013
An Act of the Scottish Parliament to make provision about hedges which interfere with the reasonable enjoyment of residential properties.
Aquaculture and Fisheries (Scotland) Act 2013	2013 asp 7	18 June 2013
An Act of the Scottish Parliament to make provision about fish farming and shellfish farming; about salmon fisheries and freshwater fisheries; about sea fisheries; about shellfish waters and fisheries for shellfish; about charging in connection with functions relating to fish farming, shellfish farming, salmon fisheries, freshwater fisheries and sea fisheries; about fixed penalty notices for offences under certain aquaculture, fisheries and other marine legislation; and for connected purposes.
Forth Road Bridge Act 2013	2013 asp 8	28 June 2013
An Act of the Scottish Parliament to make provision about the management and maintenance of the Forth Road Bridge.
National Trust for Scotland (Governance etc.) Act 2013	2013 asp 9	28 June 2013
An Act of the Scottish Parliament to alter the status of the National Trust for Scotland's president and vice-presidents; to increase the maximum term of co-option for members of its council; to abolish representative membership of its council; and to validate use of the customary abbreviation of its name.
Crofting (Amendment) (Scotland) Act 2013	2013 asp 10	31 July 2013
An Act of the Scottish Parliament to allow decrofting by owner-occupier crofters; and for connected purposes.
Land and Buildings Transaction Tax (Scotland) Act 2013	2013 asp 11	31 July 2013
An Act of the Scottish Parliament to make provision about the taxation of land transactions.
Post-16 Education (Scotland) Act 2013	2013 asp 12	7 August 2013
An Act of the Scottish Parliament to make provision about the support for, and the governance of, further and higher education institutions, including provision for the regionalisation of colleges; to make provision for reviews of how further and higher education is provided; to make provision for sharing information about young people's involvement in education and training; and for connected purposes.
Scottish Independence Referendum (Franchise) Act 2013	2013 asp 13	7 August 2013
An Act of the Scottish Parliament to make provision about those who are entitled to vote in a referendum on the independence of Scotland, including provision for the establishment of a register of young voters for the purposes of such a referendum.
Scottish Independence Referendum Act 2013	2013 asp 14	17 December 2013
An Act of the Scottish Parliament to make provision, in accordance with paragraph 5A of Part 1 of Schedule 5 to the Scotland Act 1998, (Note: Scotland Act 1998 (c. 46)) for the holding of a referendum in Scotland on a question about the independence of Scotland.

== See also ==
- List of acts of the Scottish Parliament
