= Referendums (Scotland) Act 2020 =

Act of the Scottish Parliament

Referendums (Scotland) Act 2020 (Note: Section 42.)
- Act of the Scottish Parliament
- Scottish Parliament
- Long title: An Act of the Scottish Parliament to make provision about the holding of referendums throughout Scotland.
- Citation: 2020 asp 2
- Introduced by: Michael Russell MSP
- Territorial extent: Scotland

Dates
- Royal assent: 29 January 2020
- Commencement: 30 January 2020 (Note: Section 41.)

Other legislation
- Amends: Scottish Public Services Ombudsman Act 2002
- Amended by: Scottish Elections (Reform) Act 2020; Dissolution and Calling of Parliament Act 2022

Status: Amended

Text of statute as originally enacted

Revised text of statute as amended

Text of the Referendums (Scotland) Act 2020 as in force today (including any amendments) within the United Kingdom, from legislation.gov.uk.

The Referendums (Scotland) Act 2020 (asp 2) is an act of the Scottish Parliament which was passed by Parliament on 19 December 2019. This Act sets of a framework under Scots Law for the administration and governing of referendums in Scotland on any issue within the legal competence of the Scottish Parliament.

== Legislative passagte ==
The bill was introduced by Cabinet Secretary for Constitutional Relations, Michael Russell, on 28 May 2019 as a government bill.

The lead scrutinising committee was the Finance and Constitution Committee.

The Scottish Government intended for this Act to form the statutory basis for their proposed referendum on Scottish independence, which the First Minister of Scotland, Nicola Sturgeon, requested the power to hold such a referendum in late 2019.

== Provisions ==
The act establishes a framework for any referendum in Scotland.

Further primary legislation is needed to actually hold a referendum.

== See also ==
- Scottish Independence Referendum Act 2013
