= Parliamentary Standards Commissioner =

Parliamentary Standards Commissioner may refer to:

- Parliamentary Commissioner for Standards, in the United Kingdom Parliament
- Scottish Parliamentary Standards Commissioner, in the Scottish Parliament
