= List of acts of the Scottish Parliament from 2020 =

This is a list of acts of the Scottish Parliament passed in 2020. Acts of the Scottish Parliament are enacted by the Scottish Parliament, which has legislative authority over devolved matters in relation to Scotland under the authority of the Scotland Act 1998. Acts are cited by calendar year, in the same fashion as acts of Parliament of the United Kingdom. Each act passed in a respective year is numbered consecutively with Arabic numerals, following the prefix "asp".

18 acts of the Scottish Parliament were passed in 2020.

indicates that an act has been transcribed on Wikisource, indicates that an act is available to view at legislation.gov.uk, and indicates the location of the original act in the Parliamentary Archives.

== Acts of the Scottish Parliament ==
Short title	Citation	Royal assent
Long title
UEFA European Championship (Scotland) Act 2020	2020 asp 1	23 January 2020
An Act of the Scottish Parliament to make provision in relation to the Union of European Football Associations European Championship that is to be held, in part, in Glasgow in 2020.
Referendums (Scotland) Act 2020	2020 asp 2	29 January 2020
An Act of the Scottish Parliament to make provision about the holding of referendums throughout Scotland.
Scottish National Investment Bank Act 2020	2020 asp 3	25 February 2020
An Act of the Scottish Parliament to require the establishment of the Scottish National Investment Bank and to make further provision in connection with that body.
Non-Domestic Rates (Scotland) Act 2020	2020 asp 4	11 March 2020
An Act of the Scottish Parliament to make provision about non-domestic rates.
Budget (Scotland) Act 2020	2020 asp 5	18 March 2020
An Act of the Scottish Parliament to make provision, for financial year 2020/21, for the use of resources by the Scottish Administration and certain bodies whose expenditure is payable out of the Scottish Consolidated Fund, for the maximum amounts of borrowing by certain statutory bodies and for authorising the payment of sums out of the Fund; to make provision, for financial year 2021/22, for authorising the payment of sums out of the Fund on a temporary basis; and for connected purposes.
Scottish Elections (Franchise and Representation) Act 2020	2020 asp 6	1 April 2020
An Act of the Scottish Parliament to enfranchise certain persons in respect of Scottish parliamentary and local government elections; to extend to certain persons the right to vote at, stand for election at, and hold office as elected members following, Scottish parliamentary and local government elections; and for connected purposes.
Coronavirus (Scotland) Act 2020	2020 asp 7	6 April 2020
An Act of the Scottish Parliament to make provision in connection with coronavirus; and for connected purposes.
Scottish Biometrics Commissioner Act 2020	2020 asp 8	20 April 2020
An Act of the Scottish Parliament to establish the office of Scottish Biometrics Commissioner and to provide for its functions in relation to the acquisition, retention, use and destruction of biometric data for criminal justice and police purposes.
Female Genital Mutilation (Protection and Guidance) (Scotland) Act 2020	2020 asp 9	24 April 2020
An Act of the Scottish Parliament to provide for female genital mutilation protection orders and for guidance in relation to such orders and in relation to the prevention of female genital mutilation generally; and for connected purposes.
Coronavirus (Scotland) (No. 2) Act 2020	2020 asp 10	26 May 2020
An Act of the Scottish Parliament to make provision in connection with coronavirus; and for connected purposes.
Consumer Scotland Act 2020	2020 asp 11	9 June 2020
An Act of the Scottish Parliament to establish Consumer Scotland and provide for its functions as a consumer advocacy and advice body; and to require regard to be had to consumer interests.
Scottish Elections (Reform) Act 2020	2020 asp 12	8 July 2020
An Act of the Scottish Parliament to reform certain aspects of the law relating to Scottish parliamentary and local government elections, including length of terms; to make provision about the role of the Electoral Commission in relation to those elections; to confer functions on the Electoral Management Board for Scotland in relation to Scottish parliamentary elections; to rename and make provision about the Local Government Boundary Commission for Scotland; and for connected purposes.
Disclosure (Scotland) Act 2020	2020 asp 13	14 July 2020
An Act of the Scottish Parliament to restate and amend the law relating to the disclosure of criminal history and other information by the Scottish Ministers; to make amendments to the Protection of Vulnerable Groups (Scotland) Act 2007; and for connected purposes.
Animals and Wildlife (Penalties, Protections and Powers) (Scotland) Act 2020	2020 asp 14	21 July 2020
An Act of the Scottish Parliament to increase penalties for the most serious animal welfare offences, to provide for fixed penalties in relation to animal welfare offences generally, to increase the protection for service animals from being caused unnecessary suffering, to require courts to consider making disqualification orders following convictions for animal welfare offences, to provide for fixed penalties in relation to animal health offences, to increase penalties in relation to certain wildlife offences, to provide for fixed penalties in relation to wildlife offences, to increase the protection for seals from being killed, injured or taken; to confer power on inspectors and constables, where animals have been taken into possession to alleviate their suffering, to make arrangements for the treatment, transfer or destruction of those animals; and for connected purposes.
Civil Partnership (Scotland) Act 2020	2020 asp 15	28 July 2020
An Act of the Scottish Parliament to enable persons of different sexes to be in a civil partnership; and for connected purposes.
Children (Scotland) Act 2020	2020 asp 16	1 October 2020
An Act of the Scottish Parliament to amend the law relating to children; and for connected purposes.
Agriculture (Retained EU Law and Data) (Scotland) Act 2020	2020 asp 17	1 October 2020
An Act of the Scottish Parliament to confer powers to modify certain retained EU law relating to agriculture, including power to make new provision about marketing standards in relation to agricultural products and the classification of carcasses; to make provision about the collection and processing of information connected with food supply chains and agricultural activities; and for connected purposes.
Social Security Administration and Tribunal Membership (Scotland) Act 2020	2020 asp 18	10 November 2020
An Act of the Scottish Parliament to modify the Social Security (Scotland) Act 2018 (Note: Social Security (Scotland) Act 2018 (asp 19)) in relation to the appointment of persons to act on behalf of applicants; the provision of information in connection with the determination of eligibility for assistance; the duty to inform about possible eligibility for assistance; the operation of top-up assistance; the diagnosis of terminal illness for disability assistance purposes; and the recovery of assistance given in error; and to modify the Tribunals (Scotland) Act 2014 (Note: Tribunals (Scotland) Act 2014 (asp 10)) in relation to the eligibility of judicial office-holders to sit in the First-tier Tribunal and the Upper Tribunal.

== See also ==
- List of acts of the Scottish Parliament
