= All-party parliamentary group =

Type of group in the UK Parliament

An all-party parliamentary group (APPG) is a technical group in the Parliament of the United Kingdom that is composed of members of parliament from all political parties, but has no official status within Parliament.

== Description and functions ==
Number of APPGs
Year	Groups
2015	580
2016	555
2017	601
2018	614
2019	692
2020	355
2021	696
2022	755

All-party parliamentary groups are informal cross-party groups of members of the House of Commons and the House of Lords and have no official status within Parliament. Larger APPGs generally have officers drawn from the major political parties from both houses.

APPG members meet to discuss a particular issue of concern and explore relevant issues relating to their topic. APPGs regularly examine issues of policy relating to a particular areas, discussing new developments, inviting stakeholders and government ministers to speak at their meetings, and holding inquiries into a pertinent matter. APPGs have no formal place in the legislature, but are an effective way of bringing together parliamentarians and interested stakeholders.

Every APPG must hold at least two meetings during its reporting year, one of which must be an annual general meeting (AGM) or a meeting which involves an inaugural election of officers. APPGs cease to exist when Parliament is dissolved for a general election, and must be reconstituted.

The official register of APPGs is updated about every six weeks. The number of APPGs is very variable. For example, in 2015 there were more than 550 APPGs. On 2 January 2019, there were 692 APPGs. As of 24 February 2020, there were 355 APPGs. In March 2022, one MP chaired 24 APPGs, and 17 MPs chaired over 5 APPGs.

On 13 May 2014, the House of Commons gave the Commons Select Committee on Standards the power to update the rules for APPGs, which periodically conducts an inquiry to review the rules.

== Examples ==
APPGs are either country-based, such as the APPGs on Chile or Zimbabwe, or subject-based, such as the APPG on breast cancer, with the topics reflecting parliamentarians' concerns. As of June 2022, examples of subject-based APPGs include:

- Adult education
- ADHD
- Climate change
- Coronavirus
- Drug policy reform
- Events
- Fire safety and rescue
- Frozen British pensions
- Human rights
- Limits to growth
- Maritime and ports
- Myalgic Encephalomyelitis
- Obesity
- Poverty
- Pro-life
- Rugby league
- School food
- Social integration
- Taxis
- Uyghurs
- Whistleblowing
- Zoos and aquariums

== Involvement of other bodies ==
APPGs allow campaign groups, charities, and other non-governmental organisations active in the field to become involved in discussions and influence politicians. Often a relevant charity or other organisation will provide a secretariat for the APPG, helping to arrange meetings and keeping track of its members. Examples of this include:

- Survival International acting as secretariat for the All-Party Parliamentary Group for Tribal Peoples.
- Humanists UK acting as secretariat for the All Party Parliamentary Humanist Group.
- The APPG on Christianity being administered by a staff member from the Bible Society.
- InterClimate Network acting as secretariat for the All-Party Parliamentary Group on Youth Action against Climate Change.
- Polar Research and Policy Initiative acting as secretariat for the All-Party Parliamentary Group for Greenland.
- Local Trust acting as secretariat for the All-Party Parliamentary Group for 'left behind' neighbourhoods.

Other ways of administering APPGs include borrowing capacity from an MP or peer's office, or by employing staff independently. The All-Party Parliamentary Group on Freedom of Religion or Belief, for example, employs two members of staff paid for through subscriptions from its stakeholders. The APPG on Agriculture and Food for Development uses a similar model.

Other APPGs may have less stringent administrative needs, such as the UK parliament's All Party Parliamentary Jazz Appreciation Group.

== Associate parliamentary groups ==
In the Parliament of the United Kingdom, an associate parliamentary group is similar to an all-party parliamentary group except that it is made up of not only members of the House of Commons or Lords but can also include members from outside Parliament.

== Criticism ==
In early 2016, the Registrar of Consultant Lobbyists launched an inquiry into concerns that APPGs were being used to bypass lobbying registration rules, following reports that lobbyists were acting as APPG secretariats and so gaining access to legislators.

As sponsorship for trip to Pakistan and Azad Jammu and Kashmir between 18 and 22 February 2020, the APPG on Kashmir (APPGK), chaired by Labour MP Debbie Abrahams, received a "benefit in kind" of amounting £31,501 (Rs 29.7 lakh) and £33,000 (Rs 31.2 lakh) on 18 February 2020 from the Government of Pakistan.

In April 2022, the Commons Select Committee on Standards published its periodic inquiry into APPGs, focusing on the risk of improper access and influence by paid lobbyists, commercial entities or hostile state actors. The committee is still considering its recommendations for rule changes.

In December 2022, POLITICO reported that over a dozen MPs, peers, diplomatic and parliamentary officials had told them that MPs had used parliamentary trips abroad as an opportunity to use sex workers and for excessive drinking, particularly on trips by single-country APPGs. APPGs have less stringent rules than select committee visits.

== See also ==
- Congressional caucus
- Parliamentary group
- Parliamentary and Scientific Committee
