= Glenmavis =

Coordinates: 55.8853°N 3.9983°W

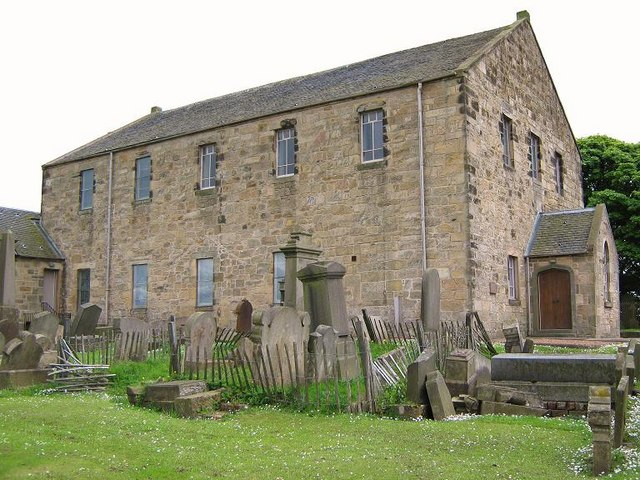
- New Monkland parish church, known locally as "The Auld Grey Kirk on the Hill"

- Location within North Lanarkshire
- Population: 2,200 (2020)
- Council area: North Lanarkshire
- Country: Scotland
- Sovereign state: United Kingdom
- Post town: AIRDRIE
- Postcode district: ML6
- Dialling code: 01236
- Police: Scotland
- Fire: Scottish
- Ambulance: Scottish

Glenmavis is a village in the North Lanarkshire area of Scotland. It is about two miles (three kilometres) northwest of Airdrie on the B802 road. It has a population of around 2,200 (2020).

== Etymology ==
The etymology of the name is ‘glen of the song-thrush’.

== History ==
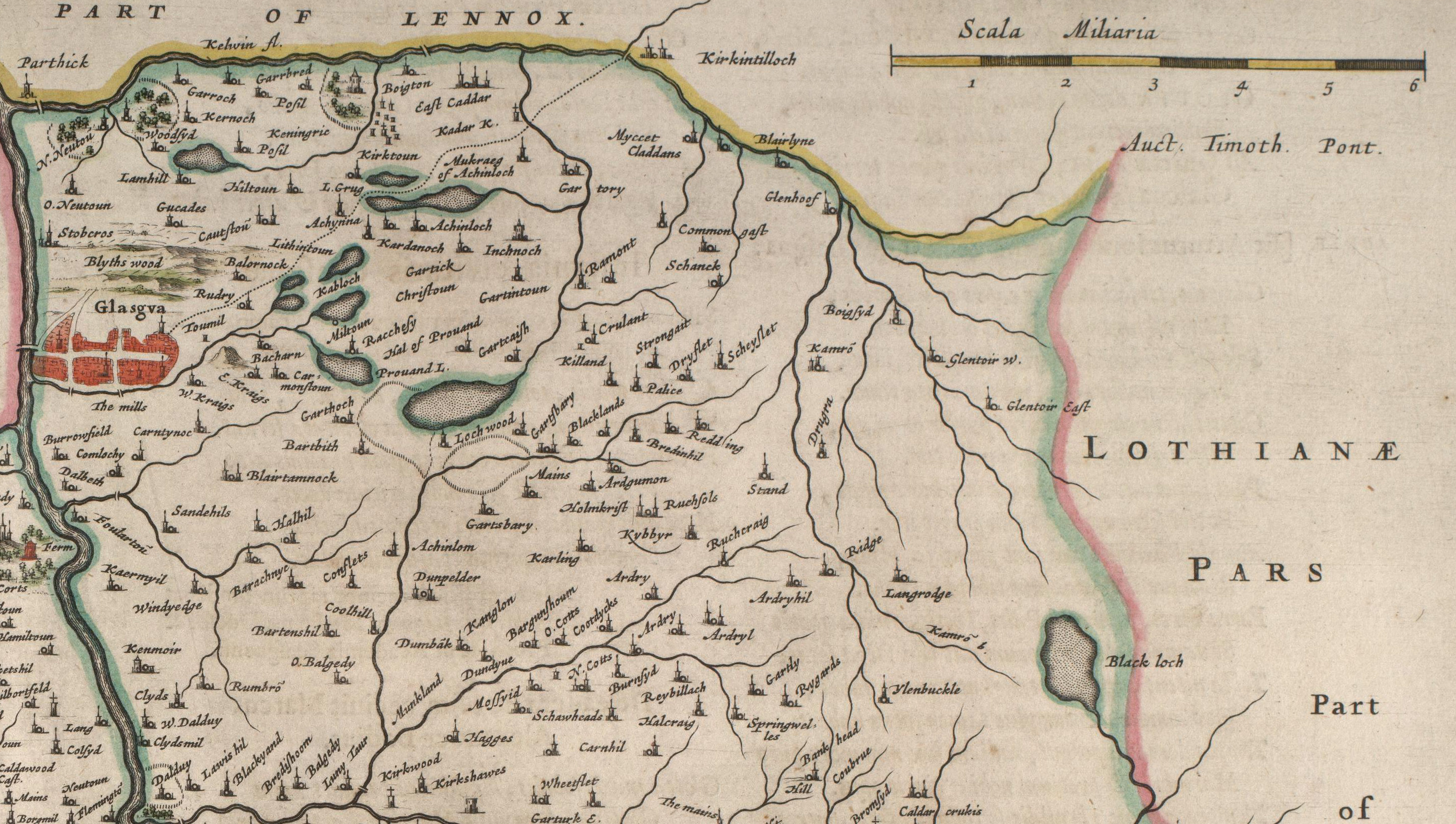
Blaeu's map based on Pont's original "Glasgow and the county of Lanark" map c.1596 depicting Ardry (Airdrie) and Ruchsols (Rochsoles) amongst others.

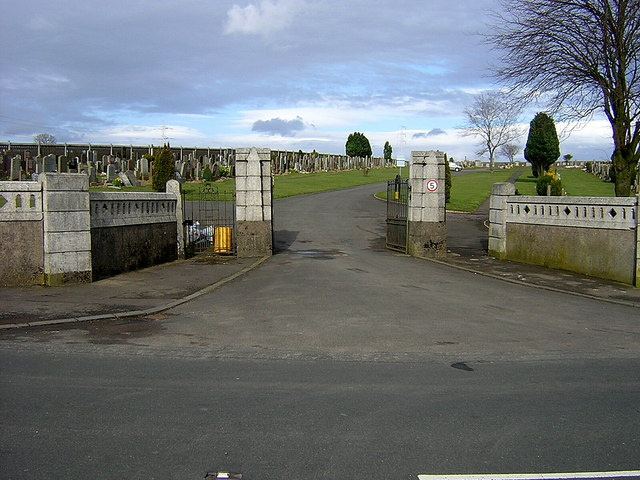
New Monkland Cemetery

The village now known as Glenmavis consists of what was once two separate communities. These built up close to the earlier Rochsoles House which is found on Timothy Pont's map. To the east of the church was the village of New Monkland, whereas the newer community to the West was Glenmavis. However, the two effectively merged after World War II. The issue is further confused by the fact that the wider community (including what was once a small hamlet called Arderyth which became Airdrie) was also known as New Monkland. It is for this reason that the school is New Monkland Primary. The school was founded by the Kirk Session of New Monkland (then East Monkland) Church in 1691.

New Monkland Cemetery had for many years two distinct parts. The part nearest Condorrat Road was for those from Airdrie while the more eastern part (known as the Landward Cemetery) was for those from the rural area. An oddity of the cemetery is that within it there is another cemetery which was originally in Chapel Street, Airdrie. The remains were disinterred and reburied along with the headstones many years ago and there was a heavy chain round that area. From the church gate the island of Arran is sometimes visible on a fine day. There was a castle at Rochsoles Park, followed by a mansion, now demolished, apart from the stables. Formerly a pit village, there are no longer any active coal mines in the area. A blacksmith, a vintner and a wright worked in the village in 1837.

There is a major liquefied natural gas (LNG) storage depot to the north of the village. In 1992 the gas plant was modified by the installation of a Solexol treatment plant including the installation of the main process column "D121". The modifications also included upgrade of the "cold box" plants that are required for the liquification process.

== Notable residents ==
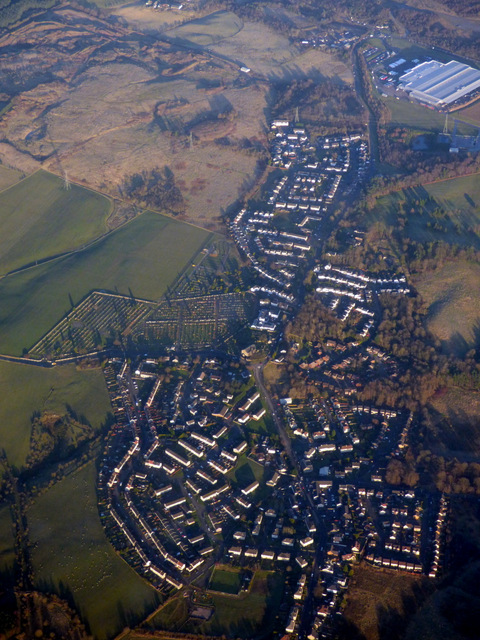
Glenmavis from the air

- Graeme Armstrong, writer
- John Carmichael, recipient of the Victoria Cross (V.C.)
- Dorothea Gerard (1855-1915), novelist

== See also ==
- List of places in North Lanarkshire
