= Medics Against Violence =

Medics against Violence (MAV) is a Scottish Charity that is involved with education and training in schools and to a range of professionals. It was founded in 2008.

== History ==
The organisation was founded in November 2008 by three Scottish Surgeons: Christine Goodall, Mark Devlin and David Koppel along with Karyn McCluskey from the Scottish Violence Reduction Unit (VRU). Their stated aims are the prevention of serious injury and death, particularly among the young people of Scotland, and to change attitudes to violence in Scotland through education and awareness raising. They had start up funding of £80,000 from the Scottish Government. MAV is a participant in the World Health Organization's Violence Prevention Alliance. They became a charity registered with the Office of the Scottish Charity Regulator in December 2009 (SC041153).

=== School visits ===
By June 2009, the first phase of MAV's schools project had trained 55 volunteers. Visits to 13- to 14-year-old pupils in schools were planned to commence at the start of the coming school year. Sessions would involve medics speaking to pupils about the consequences of violence using a set lesson plan and film, illustrating this with experiences from a wide range of medical specialties. MAV concentrated on schools in areas of urban deprivation or those with high levels of youth violence. There was a particular focus on issues around knife crime and gang membership. As of 2011 MAV had spoken to over 5000 young people in schools in the west of Scotland.

=== Other professionals ===
A joint initiative launched in 2010 with the VRU saw MAV train dentists to spot victims of domestic violence and signpost them towards help. MAV also take part in the VRU project the Community Initiative to Reduce Violence (CIRV) and in the Scottish Government's project No Knives Better Lives.

They planned to pilot workshops for hairdressers at Ayrshire College in 2015. By September 2015, around 2,000 people had received training, including some hairdressers and members of the fire and rescue service as well as dentists, doctors and vets. At that point the Scottish Government announced £115,000 had been awarded to extend the Ask, Validate, Document and Refer (AVDR) programme to make it available to more professionals across Scotland.

== Awards ==
They won a Scottish Policing Award in 2009 for their outstanding contribution to Criminal Justice and Tackling Crime and in 2011 won the Public Service Award for Glasgow East in the Community Champion Awards.
