= Freedom of Information (Amendment) (Scotland) Act 2013 =

- Act of the Scottish Parliament
- Scottish Parliament
- Long title: An Act of the Scottish Parliament to amend provisions of the Freedom of Information (Scotland) Act 2002 relating to the designation of authorities, the effect of various exemptions and the time limit for certain proceedings.
- Citation: 2013 asp 2

Dates
- Royal assent: 19 February 2013
- Commencement: 20 February 2013; 31 May 2013

Other legislation
- Amends: Freedom of Information (Scotland) Act 2002

Status: Current legislation

Text of statute as originally enacted

Text of the Freedom of Information (Amendment) (Scotland) Act 2013 as in force today (including any amendments) within the United Kingdom, from legislation.gov.uk.

The Freedom of Information (Amendment) (Scotland) Act 2013 (asp 2) is an act of the Scottish Parliament relating to freedom of information requests in Scotland.

== Provisions ==
It amended the Freedom of Information (Scotland) Act 2002.

The act exempts communications between the Scottish Government and the Queen.

== Reception ==
The royal exemption was criticised by the Information Commissioner.
