= Scottish Public Services Ombudsman Act 2002 =

Act of the Scottish Parliament

Scottish Public Services Ombudsman Act 2002 (Note: Section 27(4).)
- Act of the Scottish Parliament
- Scottish Parliament
- Long title: An Act of the Scottish Parliament to make provision (including provision for the purposes of section 91 of the Scotland Act 1998) for the appointment and functions of the Scottish Public Services Ombudsman; and for connected purposes.
- Citation: 2002 asp 11
- Introduced by: Angus MacKay
- Territorial extent: Scotland

Dates
- Royal assent: 23 April 2002
- Commencement: 23 October 2002 (Note: Section 27(1). The Scottish Public Services Ombudsman Act 2002 (Commencement and Revocation of Transitory and Transitional Provisions) Order 2002.)
Other legislation
Amends	Local Government (Scotland) Act 1975; Local Government (Scotland) Act 1978; Local Government, Planning and Land Act 1980; Local Government (Miscellaneous Provisions) (Scotland) Act 1981; Mental Health (Scotland) Act 1984; Hospital Complaints Procedure Act 1985; Law Reform (Miscellaneous Provisions) (Scotland) Act 1985; Legal Aid (Scotland) Act 1986; Local Government Act 1988; Housing (Scotland) Act 1988; Official Secrets Act 1989; Local Government and Housing Act 1989; Health Service Commissioners Act 1993; Local Government etc. (Scotland) Act 1994; Children (Scotland) Act 1995; Town and Country Planning (Scotland) Act 1997; Planning (Listed Buildings and Conservation Areas) (Scotland) Act 1997; Planning (Hazardous Substances) (Scotland) Act 1997; Scottish Legal Services Ombudsman and Commissioner for Local Administration in Scotland Act 1997; Ethical Standards in Public Life etc. (Scotland) Act 2000; National Parks (Scotland) Act 2000; Freedom of Information Act 2000; Regulation of Care (Scotland) Act 2001
Amended by	Freedom of Information (Scotland) Act 2002; Mental Health (Care and Treatment) (Scotland) Act 2003; Health Protection Agency Act 2004; School Education (Ministerial Powers and Independent Schools) (Scotland) Act 2004; Primary Medical Services (Scotland) Act 2004; Railways Act 2005; Smoking, Health and Social Care (Scotland) Act 2005; Further and Higher Education (Scotland) Act 2005; Licensing (Scotland) Act 2005; Management of Offenders etc. (Scotland) Act 2005; Gaelic Language (Scotland) Act 2005; Water Services etc. (Scotland) Act 2005; Transport (Scotland) Act 2005; Mental Health (Care and Treatment) (Scotland) Act 2003 (Modification of Enactments) Order 2005; Scottish Commission for Human Rights Act 2006; Natural Environment and Rural Communities Act 2006; Tourist Boards (Scotland) Act 2006; Dairy Produce (Miscellaneous Provisions) Regulations 2007; Judiciary and Courts (Scotland) Act 2008; Health Act 2009; Companies Act 2006 (Consequential Amendments, Transitional Provisions and Savings) Order 2009; Scottish Public Services Ombudsman Act 2002 (Amendment) Order 2009; Public Services Reform (Scotland) Act 2010; Criminal Justice and Licensing (Scotland) Act 2010; Scottish Parliamentary Commissions and Commissioners etc. Act 2010; Local Electoral Administration (Scotland) Act 2011; Scottish Public Services Ombudsman Act 2002 Amendment Order 2011; National Library of Scotland Act 2012; Police and Fire Reform (Scotland) Act 2012; British Waterways Board (Transfer of Functions) Order 2012; Scottish Public Services Ombudsman Act 2002 Amendment Order 2012; Scottish Public Services Ombudsman Act 2002 Amendment (No. 2) Order 2012; Post-16 Education (Scotland) Act 2013; Public Services Reform (Commissioner for Ethical Standards in Public Life in Scotland etc.) Order 2013; Historic Environment Scotland Act 2014; Housing (Scotland) Act 2014; Public Bodies (Abolition of Food from Britain) Order 2014; Public Bodies (Abolition of the National Consumer Council and Transfer of the Office of Fair Trading’s Functions in relation to Estate Agents etc) Order 2014; Food (Scotland) Act 2015; Welfare Funds (Scotland) Act 2015; Lobbying (Scotland) Act 2016; Inquiries into Fatal Accidents and Sudden Deaths etc. (Scotland) Act 2016; Community Justice (Scotland) Act 2016; Children and Young People (Scotland) Act 2014 (Part 4 and Part 5 Complaints) Order 2016; Public Services Reform (Social Work Complaints Procedure) (Scotland) Order 2016; First-tier Tribunal for Scotland (Transfer of Functions of the Private Rented Housing Committees) Regulations 2016; Crown Estate Scotland Order 2017; Data Protection Act 2018; South of Scotland Enterprise Act 2019; Scottish Crown Estate Act 2019; Consumer Scotland Act 2020; Scottish Elections (Reform) Act 2020; Referendums (Scotland) Act 2020; Scottish Biometrics Commissioner Act 2020; Public Services Reform (The Scottish Public Services Ombudsman) (Healthcare Whistleblowing) Order 2020; Redress for Survivors (Historical Child Abuse in Care) (Scotland) Act 2021; Patient Safety Commissioner for Scotland Act 2023; Education (Scotland) Act 2025; Scottish Public Services Ombudsman Act 2002 Amendment Order 2025

Status: Current legislation

History of passage through the Parliament

Text of statute as originally enacted

Revised text of statute as amended

Text of the Scottish Public Services Ombudsman Act 2002 as in force today (including any amendments) within the United Kingdom, from legislation.gov.uk.

The Scottish Public Services Ombudsman Act 2002 (asp 11) is an act of the Scottish Parliament which establishes an organisation for handling complaints about public services in Scotland. The act makes provision for an officer, known as the Scottish Public Services Ombudsman, to be appointed and outlines functions to be exercised.

== Duties established ==
This legislation was intended to create a modern complaints service. The Act established the ombudsman as a 'one-stop-shop', assuming statutory duties that had previously been the remit of three previous offices – the Scottish Parliamentary Ombudsman, the Health Service Ombudsman, the Local Government Ombudsman for Scotland. The act also provides for the Ombudsman taking over non-statutory duties from the Housing Association Ombudsman for Scotland.

Universities are included under the legislation.

== Consultation ==
In October 2000 the Scottish Executive published a consultation paper “Modernising the Complaints System” to stimulate debate on proposals to simplify complaints procedures and streamline the existing ombudsman system. In July 2001 a second consultation paper was published- “A Modern Complaints System”, which set out more detailed proposals relating to the work of public sector ombudsmen in Scotland, taking into account responses to the initial consultation.

== Passage of the act ==
The bill for this act of the Scottish Parliament was passed by the Parliament on 21 March 2002 and it received royal assent on 23 April 2002.
