= Coronavirus (Scotland) Act 2020 =

Act of the Scottish Parliament

Coronavirus (Scotland) Act 2020 (Note: Section 18.)
- Act of the Scottish Parliament
- Scottish Parliament
- Long title: An Act of the Scottish Parliament to make provision in connection with coronavirus; and for connected purposes.
- Citation: 2020 asp 7
- Introduced by: Michael Russell MSP
- Territorial extent: Scotland

Dates
- Royal assent: 6 April 2020
- Commencement: 6 April 2020(except paragraph 11(1) of schedule 3); } (Note: Section 17.)

Other legislation
- Amends: Local Government (Scotland) Act 1973; Law Reform (Miscellaneous Provisions) (Scotland) Act 1985; Criminal Procedure (Scotland) Act 1995; Bankruptcy (Scotland) Act 2016
- Amended by: Coronavirus (Extension and Expiry) (Scotland) Act 2021
- Relates to: Coronavirus Act 2020

Status: Amended

Text of statute as originally enacted

Revised text of statute as amended

Text of the Coronavirus (Scotland) Act 2020 as in force today (including any amendments) within the United Kingdom, from legislation.gov.uk.

The Coronavirus (Scotland) Act 2020 (asp 7) was an act of the Scottish Parliament to make provisions during the COVID-19 pandemic. The Act complements and regulates the use of emergency powers given to Scottish Ministers under the UK Parliament's Coronavirus Act 2020. The act made many provisions to ease regulations in sectors that may struggle to meet their statutory requirements, such as the NHS, Social Security Scotland and the Scottish Courts and Tribunals Service.

== Provisions ==
The act made a variety of provisions to ensure continuity throughout Scotland during the Coronavirus pandemic. This covers a broad variety of issues within Scotland where it would be impossible for statutory requirements to be met or where regulations have become unworkable, notably in terms of:

- Housing provision and evictions
- Social Security Scotland assessments
- Judicial operations
- Healthcare regulations
- Death certification
- Miscellaneous provisions

=== Time limit and renewal ===
Part 1 of the act expired on 30 September 2020, and it has become unnecessary after the Coronavirus pandemic.

== Debate ==
The act was developed by the Scottish Government on a cross-party basis to ensure maximum support. Concerns were raised at the prospect of removing the requirement of juries within judicial trials. This was accepted by the government and removed from the bill before passage. The bill was passed unanimously.

== Legislative history ==
The bill was introduced to Parliament on 31 March 2020 as an emergency bill, with all three legislative stages completed the following day. The bill was given royal assent and made law on 6 April 2020.

== See also ==
- Coronavirus Act 2020
- COVID-19 pandemic
