= Police appeals tribunal =

Police Appeals Tribunal
- Royal coat of arms of the United Kingdom as used in England and Wales
- Established: 1996
- Jurisdiction: United Kingdom
- Composition method: Home Office tribunal
- Authorised by: Police Act 1996; Police Reform and Social Responsibility Act 2011
- Appeals to: High Court of Justice (in England and Wales); Court of Session (in Scotland)
- Appeals from: Police misconduct hearings
- Website: www.gov.uk/government/organisations/police-discipline-appeals-tribunal

In the United Kingdom, a police appeals tribunal, also known as a police (discipline) appeals tribunal, hears appeals from police officer misconduct hearings.

The system of tribunals in England was established by section 85 and schedule 6 of the Police Act 1996, and later reformed by the Police Reform and Social Responsibility Act 2011. In Scotland, it was established under the Police and Fire Reform (Scotland) Act 2012.

== Proceedings ==
Hearings are facilitated and administered by the local police and crime commissioner (or equivalent body). Proceedings in England are regulated by the Police Appeals Tribunals Rules 2020 (SI 2020/1), and in Scotland by the Police Appeals Tribunals (Scotland) Rules 2013 (SSI 2013/63).

Unless the tribunal chair elects to hold the hearing in private, members of the public are able to attend PAT proceedings.

=== Grounds for appeal ===
There are three possible grounds for appeal to a PAT:

1. The finding or action imposed was unreasonable
2. New evidence makes the findings incorrect or unreasonable
3. The misconduct hearing was unfair or did not follow the correct procedures

=== Further avenues for appeal ===
Decisions of a PAT may be appealed to the High Court of Justice (or the Court of Session in Scotland), by way of judicial review.

== Representation ==
Legal representation is not compulsory, and it is not uncommon for parties to represent themselves or use a friend.

== Tribunal members ==
The three members of a tribunal will be:

- A legally qualified chair appointed by the local Police and crime commissioner, selected from a list maintained by the Home Office
- A serving senior officer
- A lay person who is not, and has never been in the police

When the appellant is a senior officer, HM Chief Inspector of Constabulary and Fire and Rescue Services or an Inspector nominated by them will replace the senior officer on the panel, and the Permanent Secretary to the Home Office or another senior Home Office officer nominated by them will replace the lay member.

== Criticism ==
In February 2024, Mark Rowley (the Metropolitan Police Commissioner) criticised the decision of a police appeals tribunal to overturn the 2021 dismissal of detective sergeant Neil Buckmaster, arguing that 'the final say on who works in [police forces] should lie with chief constables.

== See also ==
- Law enforcement in the United Kingdom
