= Community Justice (Scotland) Act 2016 =

Act of the Scottish Parliament

Community Justice (Scotland) Act 2016 (Note: Section 42.)
- Act of the Scottish Parliament
- Scottish Parliament
- Long title: An Act of the Scottish Parliament to make provision about community justice, including establishing a new national body to oversee community justice and introducing requirements in relation to the achievement of particular nationally and locally determined outcomes; and for connected purposes.
- Citation: 2016 asp 10
- Introduced by: Michael Matheson
- Territorial extent: Scotland

Dates
- Royal assent: 21 March 2016
- Commencement: various (Note: Section 41.)

Other legislation
- Amends: Criminal Procedure (Scotland) Act 1995; Scottish Public Services Ombudsman Act 2002

Status: Amended

Text of statute as originally enacted

Revised text of statute as amended

Text of the Community Justice (Scotland) Act 2016 as in force today (including any amendments) within the United Kingdom, from legislation.gov.uk.

The Community Justice (Scotland) Act 2016 (asp 10) is an act of the Scottish Parliament passed in February 2016 to make provision for new community justice arrangements. The act established a new national body to oversee community justice and it introduced requirements about achieving outcomes that were set locally and nationally.

== Passage ==
The bill was introduced on 7 May 2015 by Michael Matheson, the Cabinet Secretary for Justice.

In September 2015, a report was publisher by the Ministerial Group on Offender Reintegration. There bill was also some flexibility introduced around the date of release, to better match available support in the community.

The justice committee considered how the legislation might make provision for 32 local community planning partnerships (CPPs) taking on new responsibilities without any new funding for them to do this. The legislation established a new national body, Community Justice Scotland.

The legislation was passed unanimously on 11 February 2016.

The act received royal assent on 21 March 2016.
