= Scottish Elections (Reform) Act 2020 =

Act of the Scottish Parliament

Scottish Elections (Reform) Act 2020 (Note: Section 36.)
- Act of the Scottish Parliament
- Scottish Parliament
- Long title: An Act of the Scottish Parliament to reform certain aspects of the law relating to Scottish parliamentary and local government elections, including length of terms; to make provision about the role of the Electoral Commission in relation to those elections; to confer functions on the Electoral Management Board for Scotland in relation to Scottish parliamentary elections; to rename and make provision about the Local Government Boundary Commission for Scotland; and for connected purposes.
- Citation: 2020 asp 21
- Introduced by: Graeme Dey MSP, Minister for Parliamentary Business and Veterans

Dates
- Royal assent: 8 July 2020
- Commencement: various (Note: Section 36.)

Other legislation
- Amends: Local Government (Scotland) Act 1973; House of Commons Disqualification Act 1975; Representation of the People Act 1983; Local Government etc. (Scotland) Act 1994; Scotland Act 1998; Political Parties, Elections and Referendums Act 2000; Representation of the People (Scotland) Regulations 2001; Scottish Public Services Ombudsman Act 2002; Scottish Local Government (Elections) Act 2002; Freedom of Information (Scotland) Act 2002; Public Appointments and Public Bodies etc. (Scotland) Act 2003; Local Governance (Scotland) Act 2004; Electoral Administration Act 2006; Ethical Standards in Public Life etc. (Scotland) Act 2000 (Codes of Conduct for Members of certain Scottish Public Authorities) Order 2006; Public Services Reform (Scotland) Act 2010; Local Electoral Administration (Scotland) Act 2011; Public Records (Scotland) Act 2011; Procurement Reform (Scotland) Act 2014; Scottish Parliament (Disqualification) Order 2015; Scottish Elections (Dates) Act 2016; Gender Representation on Public Boards (Scotland) Act 2018; Islands (Scotland) Act 2018

Status: Current legislation

History of passage through the Parliament

Text of statute as originally enacted

Revised text of statute as amended

Text of the Scottish Elections (Reform) Act 2020 as in force today (including any amendments) within the United Kingdom, from legislation.gov.uk.

The Scottish Elections (Reform) Act 2020 (asp 12) is an act of the Scottish Parliament which made several reforms to local government and elections in Scotland.

== Legislative passage ==
During the legislative passage, the issue of ballot order effect was discussed.

== Provisions ==
The legislation allows 14 and 15 year olds to register to vote ahead of actually being able to vote.

The length of the term of the Scottish Parliament elections and Scottish local government elections is set to 5 years under the legislation rather than 4 years as was previously the case. This meant the next Scottish Parliament election after the 2021 Scottish Parliament election.

The legislation introduces flexibility in the number of councillors for a ward so that wards can be represented by 2 or 5 councillors rather than only 3 or 4 councillors.
