= John Carmichael (VC) =

Recipient of the Victoria Cross

John Carmichael VC MM
- Born: 1 April 1893; Glenmavis, North Lanarkshire, Scotland
- Died: 20 December 1977 (aged 84); Glenmavis, North Lanarkshire, Scotland
- Burial place: New Monkland (Landward) Cemetery
- Military career
- Allegiance: United Kingdom
- Branch: British Army
- Rank: Sergeant
- Units: Royal Engineers; Sherwood Foresters; North Staffordshire Regiment
- Conflicts: World War I
- Awards: Victoria Cross; Military Medal

Sergeant John Carmichael VC MM (1 April 1893 – 20 December 1977) was a British Army soldier and a Scottish recipient of the Victoria Cross (VC), the highest and most prestigious award for gallantry in the face of the enemy that can be awarded to British and Commonwealth forces.

Carmichael was 24 years old, and a sergeant in the 9th Battalion, The North Staffordshire Regiment (The Prince of Wales's), during the First World War when he shielded others from a grenade which he saw had been initiated. He was seriously injured by the explosion and could not walk for three years afterwards.

== Incident ==
On 8 September 1917, when excavating a trench near Hill 60, Zwarteleen, Belgium, Carmichael saw that a grenade had been unearthed and had started to burn. Rather than simply throwing the bomb out of the trench and endangering the lives of the men working on top, he immediately rushed to the spot shouting for his men to get clear, put his steel helmet over the grenade and then stood on the helmet. The grenade exploded, blowing him out of the trench causing him serious injuries, but no one else was hurt.

== Aftermath ==
=== Honoured by home town ===
On 9 July 1918, Carmichael was honoured in a ceremony in Airdrie town hall, near the village of Glenmavis where he was raised.

=== Freemasonry ===
He was initiated into Freemasonry in Lodge New Monkland, No. 88, (Airdrie, Scotland) on 9 January, Passed on 23 January and Raised on 27 March 1919.

== The medal ==
His Victoria Cross award is displayed at the Staffordshire Regiment Museum, Whittington Barracks, Lichfield, Staffordshire.

== Sources ==
- Monuments to Courage (David Harvey, 1999)
- The Register of the Victoria Cross (This England, 1997)
- The Sapper VCs (Gerald Napier, 1998)
- Scotland's Forgotten Valour (Graham Ross, 1995)
- VCs of the First World War – Passchendaele 1917 (Stephen Snelling, 1998)
