= Lobbying (Scotland) Act 2016 =

Act of the Scottish Parliament

Lobbying (Scotland) Act 2016 (Note: Section 53.)
- Act of the Scottish Parliament
- Scottish Parliament
- Long title: An Act of the Scottish Parliament to make provision about lobbying, including provision for establishing and maintaining a lobbying register and the publication of a code of conduct.
- Citation: 2016 asp 16
- Introduced by: Joe FitzPatrick, Minister for Parliamentary Business
- Territorial extent: Scotland

Dates
- Royal assent: 14 April 2016
- Commencement: 6 September 2017; 1 November 2017; 12 March 2018; (Note: Section 52.)

Other legislation
- Amends: Scottish Public Services Ombudsman Act 2002
- Relates to: Transparency of Lobbying, Non-party Campaigning and Trade Union Administration Act 2014

Status: Current legislation

History of passage through the Parliament

Text of statute as originally enacted

Revised text of statute as amended

Text of the Lobbying (Scotland) Act 2016 as in force today (including any amendments) within the United Kingdom, from legislation.gov.uk.

The Lobbying (Scotland) Act 2016 (asp 16) is an Act of the Scottish Parliament which restricts lobbying.

== Definitions ==
The act defines regulated persons as Members of the Scottish Parliament (MSPs), ministers and junior ministers of the Scottish Government, special advisers of the Scottish Government and the Permanent Secretary of the Scottish Government. These people are the only regulated persons - no other civil servants are included.

The main types of regulated entities are: companies, advocacy bodies and charities and representative bodies, but also unions, individuals, societies and LLPs with one independent statutory body being registered in 2021.

One criterion is that lobbying has to include face-to-face communication. Letters, emails and telephone calls are completely exempt.

The act excludes talking to a local MSP, irrespective of whether it is a regional or constituency MSP.

The Unincorporated Councils and Committees of the General Assembly of the Church of Scotland has an exemption from registering lobbying individual MSPs, who are not members of the Scottish Government.

== Provisions ==
The Clerk of the Scottish Parliament must maintain a "lobbying register", where meetings between regulated persons and regulated entities are recorded with details of names and addresses of the main place of business.

Failure to comply with the act can lead to a complaint to the Commissioner for Ethical Standards in Public Life in Scotland, who must publish guidance on how such cases would be handled. The commissioner may reports to the Scottish Parliament. The commissioner is now accountable to the Scottish Public Services Ombudsman.

Penalties for non-compliance can range up to £1,000.

== Consequences of the act ==
In 2020, it was reported that several instances of what could be considered "lobbying" in a colloquial sense were completely excluded by the act.

In 2024, the co-leaders were criticised as potentially falling foul of the act for offering to meet donors for £700.

In 2024, there were reports of several meetings between SSE and Gillian Martin, the then-energy minister to do with a gas plant in Aberdeenshire. SSE submitted their details disclosure to the register, but the Scottish Government did not.

== Criticisms ==
The act has been criticised for distinguishing "face-to-face" communication: it has been noted that whether a teleconference has video off or on can distinguish regulated or unregulated lobbying.

== See also ==
- Transparency of Lobbying, Non-party Campaigning and Trade Union Administration Act 2014
