= Scottish Independence Referendum (Franchise) Act 2013 =

Act of the Scottish Parliament

- Act of the Scottish Parliament
- Scottish Parliament
- Long title: An Act of the Scottish Parliament to make provision about those who are entitled to vote in a referendum on the independence of Scotland, including provision for the establishment of a register of young voters for the purposes of such a referendum.
- Citation: 2013 asp 13
- Introduced by: Nicola Sturgeon
- Territorial extent: Scotland

Dates
- Royal assent: 7 August 2013
- Expired: 1 January 2015

Status: Expired

Text of statute as originally enacted

The Scottish Independence Referendum (Franchise) Act 2013 (asp 13) is an act of the Scottish Parliament that, together with the Scottish Independence Referendum Act 2013, enabled the Scottish independence referendum of 2014.

== Provisions ==
The act set the scope for the franchise for the referendum, defining those able to vote as those aged 16 or over who were registered as voters either through the existing local government voters' register or a new "young voters" register, and holding an appropriate citizenship (Commonwealth, Irish or EU member state), with the exception of specific groups not eligible to vote in the referendum, such as convicted prisoners, and those excluded from voting at local government elections by other election laws.

== Reception ==
The former leader of the Scottish Conservatives, Annabel Goldie, described using the independence referendum as a "test bed" for extending the franchise to 16-year olds and 17-year olds as "premature" and "misjudged".
