= Scottish Parliamentary Standards Commissioner =

The Scottish Parliamentary Standards Commissioner was the independent watchdog that dealt with complaints about Member of the Scottish Parliaments between 2002 and 2010.

== History ==
The role was created by the Scottish Parliamentary Standards Commissioner Act 2002. Following an open recruitment process, Dr Jim Dyer was appointed as the first Scottish Parliamentary Standards Commissioner, from April 2003. The role involved 5–10 days of work a month and the commissioner had no staff. Dyer served two three-year terms. As commissioner he ruled that Wendy Alexander had broken Parliamentary rules about registering donations. In 2009 Dyer was succeeded by Stuart Allan.

The Scottish Parliamentary Commissions and Commissioners etc. Act 2010 transferred the powers to the Commissioner for Ethical Standards in Public Life in Scotland. The post was abolished by The Public Services Reform (Commissioner for Ethical Standards in Public Life in Scotland etc.) Order 2013 (Scottish Statutory Instrument 2013/197).
