= Transparency of Lobbying, Non-party Campaigning and Trade Union Administration Act 2014 =

- Act of Parliament
- Parliament of the United Kingdom
- Long title: An Act to make provision for establishing and maintaining a register of persons carrying on the business of consultant lobbying and to require those persons to be entered in the register; to make provision about expenditure and donations for political purposes; to make provision about the Electoral Commission’s functions with respect to compliance with requirements imposed by or by virtue of enactments; to make provision relating to a trade union’s duty to maintain a register of members under section 24 of the Trade Union and Labour Relations (Consolidation) Act 1992; and for connected purposes.
- Citation: 2014 c. 4
- Introduced by: Andrew Lansley MP, Leader of the House of Commons (Commons); Lord Wallace of Tankerness (Lords)
- Territorial extent: United Kingdom and Gibraltar

Dates
- Royal assent: 30 January 2014

Other legislation
- Amends: Representation of the People Act 1983, Trade Union and Labour Relations (Consolidation) Act 1992, Political Parties, Elections and Referendums Act 2000

Status: Current legislation

History of passage through Parliament

Text of statute as originally enacted

Revised text of statute as amended

The Transparency of Lobbying, Non-party Campaigning and Trade Union Administration Act 2014 (c. 4) is an act of Parliament in the United Kingdom introduced in July 2013. The bill was sponsored by the Cabinet Office and the Department for Business, Innovation and Skills (BIS). It was often referred to as "The Lobbying Bill" for short. It passed all parliamentary stages, and received royal assent on 30 January 2014.

The bill for the act was founded on the principle of 'transparency' and 'cleaning up politics'.

== Origins ==
The bill was introduced partly in response to the Labour selection process in Falkirk and the alleged shortcomings of the influence of Unite the Union in that process. Problems with lobbying in Westminster also prompted the Bill. Following the recent expenses scandal Prime Minister David Cameron had suggested that lobbying was the "next big scandal" to consume Parliament.

Some British trade unions suggested that the proposed bill was a cynical move by the Coalition Government. A Government spokesperson described the proposed Bill as a "radical" Bill.

The bill would reduce the expenditure by charities during an election period before they must be registered with the Electoral Commission to £5,000, a proposal which has been criticised by some charities.

== Details of the act ==
=== Part 1: Registration of consultant lobbyists ===
This Part makes an offence of consultant lobbying without prior registration, with some exceptions for specific circumstances, and in addition creates a "Registrar of Consultant Lobbyists". Section 1 states that "A person must not carry on the business of consultant lobbying unless the person is entered in the register of consultant lobbyists."

=== Part 2: Non-party campaigning ===
This Part amends electoral law relating to funding of candidates and electoral campaigning. The Political Parties, Elections and Referendums Act 2000 would be amended to reduce the amount of money permitted to be donated by "third parties", organisations which would "reasonably be regarded as intended to promote or procure the electoral success of a party or candidate". Section 26, Clause 5 amends PPERA to the effect that, when determining the intention of expenditure, "...it is immaterial that it can reasonably be regarded as intended to achieve any other purpose as well."

Clause 11 adds a new Section into PPERA to include 'electoral material' that could be reasonably regarded as promoting a specific candidate or party.

=== Part 3: Trade unions' registers of members ===
This part affects the Trade Union and Labour Relations (Consolidation) Act 1992 with regards to records of trade union membership lists and related administrative changes.

== Criticism ==
The bill, often referred to by the shorthand "Lobbying Bill", attracted criticism. The Electoral Commission admitted concerns over the "significant regulatory uncertainty" for businesses and charities. The Labour MP Angela Eagle claimed during the third reading of the Bill that the legislation "seeks to silence critics of the Government in the run-up to the general election, while letting vested interests operate out of sight" and was "an object lesson in how not to legislate". The charities Oxfam and the Royal British Legion said that the bill had a "lack of clarity".

During the Second Reading of the bill in the House of Commons, on 3 September 2013, much criticism was made of the bill. Some Members of Parliament referred to it as a "gagging bill", and others called it "risible and misconceived", and said that it amounted to a "full-frontal attack on members of society".

The National Council for Voluntary Organisations (NCVO) strongly opposed the bill; and a number of charities and other campaigning groups joined in opposition to the bill, including Action for Blind People, Action for Children, the British Heart Foundation, the Campaign to Protect Rural England, the Countryside Alliance, Guide Dogs, Islamic Relief UK, Hope not Hate, the National Federation of Women’s Institutes, the Royal British Legion, the RSPB and the Salvation Army.

== Support ==
The Leader of the House of Commons Andrew Lansley defended the Bill as being necessary because of the lack of trust in politics. Liberal Democrat MP John Thurso called the Bill "a step forward". The Deputy Leader of the House pointed out in the Commons that some of the claims made against the Bill, such as stopping updated health and safety legislation or stopping the creation of the Labour Party, were "completely outwith" the proposals.

The Deputy Leader further explained that the Bill was intended to avoid the setting up in the UK of the so-called "Super PACs" used in the United States. The former Cabinet Officer Minister Chloe Smith underlined how the Bill was about "extending transparency" during elections.

== Parliamentary timetable ==
The Transparency of Lobbying, Non-party Campaigning and Trade Union Administration Bill had its Second Reading on 3 September 2013. It completed its Commons stages on 9 October 2013. It was debated in the House of Lords from 22 October and completed its committee stage on 18 December 2013. It passed its final parliamentary stage, third reading in the House of Lords, on 28 January 2014 and received royal assent on 30 January 2014.

== See also ==
- United Kingdom labour law
- Lobbying (Scotland) Act 2016
