= Scottish Independence Referendum Act 2013 =

Act of the Scottish Parliament

- Act of the Scottish Parliament
- Scottish Parliament
- Long title: An Act of the Scottish Parliament to make provision, in accordance with paragraph 5A of Part 1 of Schedule 5 to the Scotland Act 1998, for the holding of a referendum in Scotland on a question about the independence of Scotland.
- Citation: 2013 asp 14
- Introduced by: Nicola Sturgeon

Dates
- Royal assent: 17 December 2013
Other legislation
Relates to	Scotland Act 1998

Status: Spent

Text of statute as originally enacted

Text of the Scottish Independence Referendum Act 2013 as in force today (including any amendments) within the United Kingdom, from legislation.gov.uk.

The Scottish Independence Referendum Act 2013 (asp 14) is an act of the Scottish Parliament, which was passed on 14 November 2013 and came into force on 18 December.

== Provisions ==
Together with the Scottish Independence Referendum (Franchise) Act 2013, it enabled the 2014 Scottish independence referendum. This followed an agreement between the Scottish and the United Kingdom governments to make an exception to the Scottish devolution scheme, which ordinarily reserves constitutional matters to Westminster.

The bill was introduced in the Scottish Parliament on 21 March 2013 by Nicola Sturgeon MSP, with backing from the Referendum (Scotland) Bill Committee. The Scottish National Party, as the ruling party in Scotland and led by the then First Minister of Scotland Alex Salmond, ensured that the bill was passed.

The pair of acts provided that there would be a vote in Scotland on whether Scotland would become independent from the rest of the United Kingdom. There would be a simple yes or no question: "Should Scotland be an independent country?" The vote would take place on 18 September 2014. With some exceptions, all European Union (EU) or Commonwealth citizens resident in Scotland and aged 16 or over could vote, a total of almost 4.3 million people. People of Scottish descent living outside Scotland would not be able to vote.

The act ensures that:

- The referendum would be preceded by a 16-week formal campaign period (purdah), during which spending limits apply to registered campaigners.
- The referendum would be overseen by the Electoral Commission, which would be responsible for providing information to the public.
- A chief counting officer would be appointed.
