= Office of the Registrar of Consultant Lobbyists =

UK statutory organization

Agency overview
- Formed: 9 October 2013; 13 years ago
- Headquarters: 1 Horse Guards Road London SW1A 2HQ
- Key document: Transparency Act 2014
- Website: registrarofconsultantlobbyists.org.uk

The Office of the Registrar of Consultant Lobbyists is a United Kingdom independent statutory body set up under the provisions of the Transparency of Lobbying, Non-party Campaigning and Trade Union Administration Act 2014. It maintains a register of consultant lobbyists who may operate in the United Kingdom.

The 2014 Act makes an offence of "consultant lobbying" without prior registration, with some exceptions for specific circumstances, and in addition creates a post of Registrar of Consultant Lobbyists. Section 1 states that "A person must not carry on the business of consultant lobbying unless the person is entered in the register of consultant lobbyists."

Claire Bassett was appointed as the Registrar of Consultant Lobbyists on 23 September 2025
