= Land and Buildings Transaction Tax =

Property tax in Scotland

Land and Buildings Transaction Tax (Scotland) Act 2013
- Act of the Scottish Parliament
- Scottish Parliament
- Long title: An Act of the Scottish Parliament to make provision about the taxation of land transactions.
- Citation: 2013 asp 11

Dates
- Royal assent: 31 July 2013

Status: Current legislation

Text of statute as originally enacted

Text of the Land and Buildings Transaction Tax (Scotland) Act 2013 as in force today (including any amendments) within the United Kingdom, from legislation.gov.uk.

Land and Buildings Transaction Tax (LBTT) is a property tax in Scotland. It replaced the Stamp Duty Land Tax from 1 April 2015.

LBTT is a tax applied to residential and commercial land and buildings transactions (including commercial purchases and commercial leases) where a chargeable interest is acquired. Under the Land and Buildings Transaction Tax (Scotland) Act 2013 (asp 11), a land transaction must be notified to Revenue Scotland unless it falls within one of the exempt categories contained in the Act.

Revenue Scotland administers and collects LBTT with support from Registers of Scotland.

== Overview ==
LBTT is usually paid by the solicitor on behalf of the buyer, as part of the administrative process to complete the conveyancing transaction, although final responsibility lies with the buyer. Submitting an LBTT return and making arrangements to pay the LBTT due is a prerequisite to applying for registration of title. LBTT is a progressive tax, with its structure designed so that the charge rises more than proportionately to the actual price of the property. The percentage rate for each band in LBTT is applied only to the part of the price over the relevant threshold and up to the next threshold.

== History ==
Proposals for rates and bands were announced by the Cabinet Secretary for Finance, Employment and Sustainable Growth on 9 October 2014, as part of the annual Draft Budget process and tax calculators are available to help taxpayers and agents determine the amount of LBTT due. The proposed tax rates and bands are subject to consultation and parliamentary scrutiny through the Draft Budget process, led by the Finance Committee of the Scottish Parliament. The Cabinet Secretary for Finance, Constitution and Economy announced on 21 January 2015 that he had reviewed the proposed rates and bands for residential property transactions. By 2018, an estimated 90% of Scottish home buyers were paying a smaller amount or the same, compared with stamp duty.

Generally, leases of residential property will be exempt from LBTT. For non-residential leases, Schedule 19 of the Land and Buildings Transaction Tax (Scotland) Act will apply. LBTT will be charged on both the rent and any other consideration paid for the lease. The LBTT on the rent will be payable on the net present value of the rent, and will be subject to a three yearly review that will ensure that the LBTT paid reflects the rent paid.

== Rates and bands (2016/17) ==
=== Residential property transactions ===
For residential property transactions, the rate of tax is determined by reference to percentages of the chargeable consideration for the transaction falling within the proposed bands below:

View source data.

Purchase price	LBTT rate
up to £145,000	0%
from £145,000 to £250,000	2%
from £250,000 to £325,000	5%
from £325,000 to £750,000	10%
over £750,000	12%

=== Non-residential property transactions ===
For non-residential property transactions, the rate of tax is determined by reference to percentages of the chargeable consideration for the transaction falling within the proposed bands below:

Purchase price	LBTT rate
up to £150,000	0%
from £150,000 to £250,000	1%
over £250,000	5%

=== Leases of non-residential property transactions ===
Generally, leases of residential property are exempt from LBTT. For chargeable leases, tax rates and bands apply to the Net Present Value (NPV) of the rent payable under the lease:

Net Present Value (NPV) of rent payable	Rate of tax to apply
up to £150,000	0%
over £150,000	1%

LBTT may also be payable on chargeable consideration other than rent, such as a premium. The standard tax rates and bands for non-residential property transactions apply to any such payments under a lease:

Premium	Rate of tax to apply
up to £150,000	0%
from £150,000 to £350,000	3%
over £350,000	4.5%

== Exemptions ==
The Land and Buildings Transaction Tax (Scotland) Act 2013 makes provision for the following exemptions from LBTT:

- transactions for which there is no chargeable consideration
- acquisitions by the Crown
- transfers of property on divorce, separation or the end of a civil partnership
- grants of residential leases (other than "qualifying leases" which are due to convert to ownership under the Long Leases (Scotland) Act 2012)
- property transferred to a person in relation to the will of a deceased person or the intestacy of a deceased person

== Tax reliefs ==
The Land and Buildings Transaction Tax (Scotland) Act 2013 makes provision for the following tax reliefs from LBTT:

- sale and leaseback arrangements – the leaseback element is not charged to avoid double counting
- relief for certain acquisitions of residential property
- transfers involving multiple dwellings
- certain acquisitions by Registered Social Landlords
- Alternative Finance Products and Alternative Finance Investment Bonds (AFIB) (includes Islamic finance transactions) to ensure that they are not taxed more than conventional loans
- crofting community right to buy
- group relief - enables groups to move property between companies for commercial reasons without having to consider LBTT implications
- certain transactions in connection with the reconstruction and acquisition of companies
- on the incorporation of limited liability partnerships
- charities and charitable trusts, subject to certain conditions
- where compulsory purchase orders are used by a local authority
- land transactions resulting from compliance with planning obligations
- transfers involving public bodies
