= Violence Reduction Unit =

Police Initiative in Scotland, UK

The Scottish Violence Reduction Unit is a Police Scotland initiative established in January 2005 (by Strathclyde Police) which uses a public health approach to target all forms of violent behaviour including street/gang violence, domestic abuse, school bullying and workplace bullying.

== National Expansion ==
In April 2006, the Scottish Government extended the SVRU’s remit nationwide (Scotland) thus creating a national centre of expertise on violent crime. In June 2019, following the success of the Scottish VRU and implementation of a new London unit headed by Lib Peck (former leader of Lambeth council), the Home Secretary Sajid Javid announced that he was giving £35m to police and crime commissioners in 18 local areas to set up their own local violence reduction units. This would include over £3 million to set up a VRU in the West Midlands.

== Projects ==
=== Historic Initiatives ===
In 2008 the SVRU set up the Community Initiative to Reduce Violence (CIRV) in a bid to end violence between established street gangs once and for all. The initiative was heavily modelled on the successful Boston Ceasefire Project (Operation Ceasefire) and Cincinnati Initiative to Reduce Violence. The CIRV has three basic components (enforcement; services and programmes; the moral voice of the community) and is a partnership between Police Scotland, Social services in Scotland, Education Scotland and other entities. Police operational activity, diversion projects, and help with careers, education, and anger management are all used in an attempt to end gang violence. Within three years of its introduction, more than 400 young men had joined the initiative.

Due to the correlation between alcohol misuse and violence in Scotland, in 2012 the SVRU piloted the use of SCRAMx transdermal alcohol monitors ("sobriety bracelets") which allow the blood alcohol concentration of the wearer to be monitored remotely so allowing compliance with sobriety to be monitored.

In an interview with the Guardian newspaper Niven Rennie (Director of the SVRU since 2019) defended the use of stop and search, saying it was a key element of the unit's early work ("you can't have enforcement without search"). Stop and search is a controversial power which gives police the authority to stop, question and search a person they suspect may be committing any of a variety of offences which often comes under criticism for giving police officers the power to target certain groups (for example, those from Black or Minority Ethnic communities).

=== Current Initiatives ===
The Navigator programme works out of hospital emergency departments with the aim of stopping the "revolving door of violent injury" seen in Scottish hospitals and easing the pressure of violence on the NHS.

=== Medics Against Violence ===
The unit collaborates closely with the Medics Against Violence charity, which sees NHS staff and healthcare students educate secondary pupils on the risks and consequences of engaging in violence. In addition, MAVS provides training to dentists to intervene in domestic violence while the patient is in the dentist's chair.

== Leadership ==
As of 2019 the Violence Reduction Unit was led by director Niven Rennie after SVRU co-founder and former director Karyn McCluskey became the new head of Community Justice Scotland.

As of 2023 the VRU is headed by Jimmy Paul.

== See also ==
- Glasgow gangs
