= Community Justice Scotland =

- Ceartas Coimhearsnachd Alba

Agency overview
- Formed: 2017
- Type: Executive non-departmental public body
- Jurisdiction: Scotland
- Headquarters: Saughton House, Edinburgh
- Employees: 41 (Q1 2022)
- Annual budget: £2.92 m (2022-23)
- Agency executive: Karyn McCluskey, Chief Executive
- Website: communityjustice.scot

Community Justice Scotland (Scottish Gaelic: Ceartas Coimhearsnachd Alba) is an executive non-departmental public body of the Scottish Government, which is responsible for reducing reoffending. It launched in April 2017.

It was established by the Community Justice (Scotland) Act 2016, replacing eight community justice authorities that were set up under the Management of Offenders etc. (Scotland) Act 2005.

The organisation will oversee the new local arrangements, which aims to provide more effective rehabilitation in the community, following convictions. As well as having a role in assisting people released from custody, it will also be concerned with the management of people convicted of crimes who are not sent to prison.

Karyn McCluskey, who had been Director of the Violence Reduction Unit, was named chief executive in September 2016. Jean Couper was the initial chair. Lindsay Montgomery took over as chair from 13 May 2019.

== External sources ==
- Official website
