= Commissioner for Ethical Standards in Public Life in Scotland =

- Incumbent; Ian Bruce since 1 March 2023
- Type: Commissioner
- Seat: Edinburgh
- Nominator: Scottish Parliamentary Corporate Body
- Appointer: Scottish Parliament
- Term length: 6 years
- Constituting instrument: Public Services Reform (Commissioner for Ethical Standards in Public Life in Scotland etc.) Order 2013
- Precursor: Public Standards Commissioner & Public Appointments Commissioner
- Formation: 1 July 2013; 13 years ago
- First holder: D Stuart Allan
- Salary: £83,656 - £97,672
- Website: ethicalstandards.org.uk

The commissioner for ethical standards in public life in Scotland is an independent commissioner in Scotland with the responsibility for investigating complaints about Members of the Scottish Parliament, councillors of the 32 Councils of Scotland, and board members of Scottish public bodies. The commissioner also monitors the appointment of members of specified public bodies in Scotland by the Scottish Ministers.

== History ==
=== Commissioner for Public Appointments (2003–2013) ===
The Office of the Commissioner for Public Appointments in Scotland was created by the Public Appointments and Public Bodies etc. (Scotland) Act 2003.

On 1 June 2004 Karen Carlton was appointed as the first Commissioner for Public Appointments in Scotland.

The role of the office is to regulate the process by which people are appointed to the boards of many of the public bodies operating in Scotland such as the Royal Botanic Gardens Edinburgh. Appointments to these bodies are made by Scottish Ministers, who rely on a team of people to identify and recommend to them suitable candidates for appointment. The process is administered by the Scottish Government and closely monitored by representatives of the commissioner. These representatives are called 'assessors'. An assessor is actively involved at each stage of every appointment regulated by the office; they act as a member of the team that recommends suitable candidates for appointment. The process followed by the team is open and transparent. It ensures that only people with appropriate skills, knowledge and personal qualities are recommended to Ministers. All vacancies are publicised and people who wish to be considered must submit an application and be assessed against the skills, knowledge and personal qualities required for the role. Every application is handled in the same way, to ensure equality of opportunity and treatment.

In 2006 OCPAS published a Code of Practice for Ministerial Appointments to Public Bodies in Scotland which sets out the principles and practices the commissioner expects the Scottish Government to adopt. In 2012, Stuart Allan became acting Commissioner.

=== Commissioner for Ethical Standards in Public Life (2013–present) ===
Public Services Reform (Commissioner for Ethical Standards in Public Life in Scotland etc.) Order 2013 (Note: Section 1.)
- Statutory Instrument
- Scottish Parliament
- Citation: SSI 2013/197
- Territorial extent: Scotland

Dates
- Made: 11 June 2013
- Commencement: 1 July 2013

Other legislation
- Amends: Scottish Public Services Ombudsman Act 2002
- Made under: Public Services Reform (Scotland) Act 2010

Status: Current legislation

Text of statute as originally enacted

The post was changed to the Commissioner for Ethical Standards in Public Life by the Public Services Reform (Commissioner for Ethical Standards in Public Life in Scotland etc.) Order 2013 (SSI 2013/197), legislation which came into force on 1 July 2013. Prior to that there were separate pieces of legislation to deal with complaints and investigations. The commissioner's role in public standards is legislated for in the Ethical Standards in Public Life etc. (Scotland) Act 2000, Scottish Parliamentary Standards Commissioner Act 2002 and the Public Appointments and Public Bodies etc. (Scotland) Act 2003.

Stuart Allan became the commissioner for ethical standards in public life in July 2013. Bill Thomson was appointed as Commissioner and Accountable Officer with effect from 1 April 2014.

The commissioner is responsible for reporting breaches of the Code of Practice to the Scottish ministers. The commissioner also has the power to direct the Scottish ministers to delay making appointments where the Code of Practice has been breached, and refer the matter to the Scottish Parliament. The Scottish Parliamentary Corporate Body has a statutory responsibility for appointment of the commissioner, with the agreement of the Scottish Parliament.

The position is currently held by Ian Bruce, who was first appointed as the Acting Commissioner in April 2021 and is now appointed as the Ethical Standards Commissioner from 1 March 2023. Parliament approved the appointment of Ian Bruce to take up the full-time post of Commissioner for a fixed term of 6 years. Ian Bruce has had over 15 years of specialist experience, being appointed the public appointments manager under previous Public Appointments Commissioners for Scotland. In that capacity he recruited, trained and managed the contracts of public appointments advisers, dedicated professionals with expertise in recruitment and selection and equality and diversity, who represent the independent Commissioner on selection panels to identify new board members. Ian Bruce succeeds Caroline Anderson.

== Remit and jurisdiction ==
The commissioner and his team work in two areas:

- Public standards – investigating complaints about the conduct of Members of the Scottish Parliament (MSPs), local authority councillors and members of public bodies
- Public appointments – regulating how people are appointed to the boards of public bodies
