= Karyn McCluskey =

Scottish forensic psychologist

Karyn McCluskey is a Scottish forensic psychologist who is the Chief Executive of Community Justice Scotland. She was formerly the director of the Violence Reduction Unit.

== Early life ==
She was born in Falkirk and grew up in the village of Redding near Polmont. She trained as a nurse and by her late teens worked in Accident and Emergency. She continued to work in nursing while she studied for a BSc in psychology and then a master's degree in offender profiling.

== Career ==
McCluskey worked for the West Mercia Police, before she joined Strathclyde Police as head of intelligence analysis in 2002.

In 2004, the McCluskey was asked to put together a report on how to reduce rates of violence in Glasgow. The contents of the report were accepted and this led directly to the Violence Reduction Unit (VRU) being created.

In February 2016 she was appointed to the board of the Scottish Professional Football League (SPFL) as a non-executive director.

In September 2016, she was named chief executive of Community Justice Scotland, a new national organization that would come into existence in April 2017.

== Awards and honours ==
In October 2015, McCluskey was bestowed with an honorary degree from the Open University.
