= Freedom of Information (Scotland) Act 2002 =

Act of the Scottish Parliament

Freedom of Information (Scotland) Act 2002 (Note: Section 76.)
- Act of the Scottish Parliament
- Scottish Parliament
- Long title: An Act of the Scottish Parliament to make provision for the disclosure of information held by Scottish public authorities or by persons providing services for them; and for connected purposes.
- Citation: 2002 asp 13
- Introduced by: Jim Wallace
- Territorial extent: Scotland

Dates
- Royal assent: 28 May 2002
- Commencement: 30 September 2002; 31 October 2003; 30 April 2004; 1 January 2005; (Note: Section 75.)
Other legislation
Amends	Scotland Act 1998; Scottish Public Services Ombudsman Act 2002
Amended by	Smoking, Health and Social Care (Scotland) Act 2005; National Library of Scotland Act 2012; Inquiries into Fatal Accidents and Sudden Deaths etc. (Scotland) Act 2016; Scottish Crown Estate Act 2019
Relates to	Freedom of Information Act 2000

Status: Current legislation

History of passage through the Parliament

Text of statute as originally enacted

Text of the Freedom of Information (Scotland) Act 2002 as in force today (including any amendments) within the United Kingdom, from legislation.gov.uk.

The Freedom of Information (Scotland) Act 2002 (asp 13) is an act of the Scottish Parliament.

== Provisions ==
It covers public bodies over which the Scottish Parliament has jurisdiction.

The public interest test for not disclosing information is stated in terms of "substantial prejudice".

The 2002 act established a Scottish Information Commissioner. Appeals against the commissioner go to the Court of Session.

The 2002 act does not exempt the Scottish Parliament in the way that the Freedom of Information Act 2000 provides an exemption for the Parliament of the United Kingdom.

== Implementation ==
The act came into force on 1 January 2005.

== See also ==
- Freedom of information in the United Kingdom
- Freedom of Information (Amendment) (Scotland) Act 2013
