= List of Scottish statutory instruments, 2013 =

This is a complete list of Scottish statutory instruments in 2013.

== 1-100 ==
- The National Library of Scotland Act 2012 (Commencement) Order 2013 (SSI 2013 No. 1 (C. 1))
- The Judicial Pensions and Retirement Act 1993 (Scottish Land Court) Order 2013 (S.S.I. 2013 No. 2)
- The Bovine Viral Diarrhoea (Scotland) Order 2013 (S.S.I. 2013 No. 3)
- The Sports Grounds and Sporting Events (Designation) (Scotland) Amendment Order 2013 (S.S.I. 2013 No. 4)
- The Plant Health (Scotland) Amendment Order 2013 (S.S.I. 2013 No. 5)
- The Restriction of Liberty Order etc. (Scotland) Regulations 2013 (S.S.I. 2013 No. 6)
- The Housing (Scotland) Act 2001 (Assistance to Registered Social Landlords and Other Persons) (Grants) Amendment Regulations 2013 (S.S.I. 2013 No. 7)
- The Scottish Road Works Register (Prescribed Fees) Regulations 2013 (S.S.I. 2013 No. 8)
- The Less Favoured Area Support Scheme (Scotland) Amendment Regulations 2013 (S.S.I. 2013 No. 9)
- The A828 Trunk Road (Duror Village Cycle Track) (Redetermination of Means of Exercise of Public Right of Passage) Order 2013 (S.S.I. 2013 No. 10)
- The A90 Trunk Road (Crimond) (30 mph Speed Limit) Order 2013 (S.S.I. 2013 No. 11)
- The Energy Performance of Buildings (Scotland) Amendment Regulations 2013 (S.S.I. 2013 No. 12)
- The A85 (Main Street, Methven) (Temporary Prohibition of Waiting, Loading and Unloading) Order 2013 (S.S.I. 2013 No. 13)
- The Looked After Children (Scotland) Amendment Regulations 2013 (S.S.I. 2013 No. 14)
- The North West Scotland Trunk Roads (Temporary Prohibitions of Traffic and Overtaking and Temporary Speed Restrictions) (No.1) Order 2013 (S.S.I. 2013 No. 15)
- The South West Scotland Trunk Roads (Temporary Prohibitions of Traffic and Overtaking and Temporary Speed Restrictions) (No. 1) Order 2013 (S.S.I. 2013 No. 16)
- The South East Scotland Trunk Roads (Temporary Prohibitions of Traffic and Overtaking and Temporary Speed Restrictions) (No. 1) Order 2013 (S.S.I. 2013 No. 17)
- The North East Scotland Trunk Roads (Temporary Prohibitions of Traffic and Overtaking and Temporary Speed Restrictions) (No. 1) Order 2013 (S.S.I. 2013 No. 18)
- The Private Rented Housing (Scotland) Act 2011 (Commencement No. 5 and Transitional Provision) Order 2013 (S.S.I. 2013 No. 19 (C. 2))
- The Tenant Information Packs (Assured Tenancies) (Scotland) Order 2013 (S.S.I. 2013 No. 20)
- The Bovine Viral Diarrhoea (Scotland) Amendment Order 2013 (S.S.I. 2013 No. 21)
- The Knife Dealers (Licence Conditions) (Scotland) Order 2013 (S.S.I. 2013 No. 22)
- Act of Sederunt (Messengers-at-Arms and Sheriff Officers Rules) (Amendment) 2013 (S.S.I. 2013 No. 23)
- The Public Services Reform (Planning) (Local Review Procedure) (Scotland) Order 2013 (S.S.I. 2013 No. 24)
- The Public Services Reform (Planning) (Pre-application consultation) (Scotland) Order 2013 (S.S.I. 2013 No. 25)
- The Planning etc. (Scotland) Act 2006 (Supplementary and Consequential Provisions) Order 2013 (S.S.I. 2013 No. 26)
- The A9 Trunk Road (Kessock Bridge) (Temporary Prohibition of Specified Turns and Use of Specified Lanes) Order 2013 (S.S.I. 2013 No. 27)
- The A9 and A82 Trunk Roads (Kessock Bridge) (Temporary Prohibitions on Use and Speed Limits) Order 2013 (S.S.I. 2013 No. 28)
- The Water Environment (Drinking Water Protected Areas) (Scotland) Order 2013 (S.S.I. 2013 No. 29)
- The A82 Trunk Road (Aberchalder Bridge) (Temporary Prohibition of Traffic) Order 2013 (S.S.I. 2013 No. 30)
- The Wildlife and Countryside Act 1981 (Variation of Schedules A1 and 1A) (Scotland) Order 2013 (S.S.I. 2013 No. 31)
- The Non-Domestic Rates (Levying) (Scotland) Amendment Regulations 2013 (S.S.I. 2013 No. 34)
- The Police Service of Scotland Regulations 2013 (S.S.I. 2013 No. 35)
- The Non-Domestic Rating (Valuation of Utilities) (Scotland) Amendment Order 2013 (S.S.I. 2013 No. 36)
- The Non-Domestic Rating (Unoccupied Property) (Scotland) Amendment Regulations 2013 (S.S.I. 2013 No. 37)
- The Tobacco and Primary Medical Services (Scotland) Act 2010 (Commencement No. 3) Order 2013 (S.S.I. 2013 No. 38 (C. 3))
- The Police Service of Scotland (Promotion) Regulations 2013 (S.S.I. 2013 No. 39)
- The National Assistance (Sums for Personal Requirements) (Scotland) Regulations 2013 (S.S.I. 2013 No. 40)
- The National Assistance (Assessment of Resources) Amendment (Scotland) Regulations 2013 (S.S.I. 2013 No. 41)
- The Police Service of Scotland (Police Cadets) Regulations 2013 (S.S.I. 2013 No. 42)
- The Police Service of Scotland (Special Constables) Regulations 2013 (S.S.I. 2013 No. 43)
- The Local Government Finance (Scotland) Order 2013 (S.S.I. 2013 No. 44)
- The Council Tax (Variation for Unoccupied Dwellings) (Scotland) Regulations 2013 (S.S.I. 2013 No. 45)
- The Caledonian Maritime Assets (Lochaline Ferry Services Slipway) Harbour Empowerment Order 2013 (S.S.I. 2013 No. 46)
- The Police and Fire Reform (Scotland) Act 2012 (Commencement No. 3 and Transitory Provision) Order 2013 (S.S.I. 2013 No. 47 (C. 4))
- The Council Tax Reduction (Scotland) Amendment Regulations 2013 (S.S.I. 2013 No. 48)
- The Council Tax Reduction (State Pension Credit) (Scotland) Amendment Regulations 2013 (S.S.I. 2013 No. 49)
- The Rehabilitation of Offenders Act 1974 (Exclusions and Exceptions) (Scotland) Order 2013 (S.S.I. 2013 No. 50)
- The Police and Fire Reform (Scotland) Act 2012 (Commencement No. 4, Transitory and Transitional Provisions) Order 2013 (S.S.I. 2013 No. 51 (C. 5))
- The National Health Service (Scotland) (Injury Benefits) Amendment Regulations 2013 (S.S.I. 2013 No. 52)
- The Personal Injuries (NHS Charges) (Amounts) (Scotland) Amendment Regulations 2013 (S.S.I. 2013 No. 53)
- The North East Scotland Trunk Roads (Temporary Prohibitions of Traffic and Overtaking and Temporary Speed Restrictions) (No. 2) Order 2013 (S.S.I. 2013 No. 54)
- The North West Scotland Trunk Roads (Temporary Prohibitions of Traffic and Overtaking and Temporary Speed Restrictions) (No.2) Order 2013 (S.S.I. 2013 No. 55)
- The South East Scotland Trunk Roads (Temporary Prohibitions of Traffic and Overtaking and Temporary Speed Restrictions) (No. 2) Order 2013 (S.S.I. 2013 No. 56)
- The South West Scotland Trunk Roads (Temporary Prohibitions of Traffic and Overtaking and Temporary Speed Restrictions) (No. 2) Order 2013 (S.S.I. 2013 No. 57)
- The Electricity (Applications for Consent) Amendment (Scotland) Regulations 2013 (S.S.I. 2013 No. 58)
- The Fees in the Registers of Scotland (Consequential Provisions) Amendment Order 2013 (S.S.I. 2013 No. 59)
- The Police Service of Scotland (Conduct) Regulations 2013 (S.S.I. 2013 No. 60)
- The Police Service of Scotland (Performance) Regulations 2013 (S.S.I. 2013 No. 61)
- The Police Service of Scotland (Senior Officers) (Conduct) Regulations 2013 (S.S.I. 2013 No. 62)
- The Police Appeals Tribunals (Scotland) Rules 2013 (S.S.I. 2013 No. 63)
- The Education (School Lunches) (Scotland) Amendment Regulations 2013 (S.S.I. 2013 No. 64)
- The Welfare Reform (Consequential Amendments) (Scotland) Regulations 2013 (S.S.I. 2013 No. 65)
- The A977 Trunk Road (Feregait and Toll Road, Kincardine) (Temporary Prohibition of Waiting, Loading and Unloading) Order 2013 (S.S.I. 2013 No. 66)
- The Road Traffic (Permitted Parking Area and Special Parking Area) (East Renfrewshire Council) Designation Order 2013 (S.S.I. 2013 No. 67)
- The Road Traffic (Parking Adjudicators) (East Renfrewshire Council) Regulations 2013 (S.S.I. 2013 No. 68)
- The Parking Attendants (Wearing of Uniforms) (East Renfrewshire Council Parking Area) Regulations 2013 (S.S.I. 2013 No. 69)
- The National Health Service (Superannuation Scheme and Pension Scheme) (Scotland) Amendment Regulations 2013 (S.S.I. 2013 No. 70)
- The Teachers’ Superannuation (Scotland) Amendment Regulations 2013 (S.S.I. 2013 No. 71)
- Act of Adjournal (Criminal Procedure Rules Amendment) (Miscellaneous) 2013 (S.S.I. 2013 No. 72)
- The Scottish Police Authority (Provision of Goods and Services) Order 2013 (S.S.I. 2013 No. 73)
- The Financial Assistance for Environmental Purposes (Scotland) Order 2013 (S.S.I. 2013 No. 74)
- The Individual Learning Account (Scotland) Amendment Regulations 2013 (S.S.I. 2013 No. 75)
- The Police Service of Scotland (Temporary Service) Regulations 2013 (S.S.I. 2013 No. 76)
- The Late Payment of Commercial Debts (Scotland) Regulations 2013 (S.S.I. 2013 No. 77)
- The Non-Domestic Rates (Enterprise Areas) (Scotland) Amendment Regulations 2013 (S.S.I. 2013 No. 78)
- The Public Transport Users’ Committee for Scotland (Removal of Functions) Order 2013 (S.S.I. 2013 No. 79)
- The Education (Fees, Awards and Student Support) (Miscellaneous Amendments) (Scotland) Regulations 2013 (S.S.I. 2013 No. 80)
- Act of Sederunt (Rules of the Court of Session Amendment) (Protective Expenses Orders in Environmental Appeals and Judicial Reviews) 2013 (S.S.I. 2013 No. 81)
- The Private Rented Housing (Scotland) Act 2011 (Commencement No. 6 and Savings Provisions) Order 2013 (S.S.I. 2013 No. 82 (C. 6))
- The Food (Miscellaneous Amendment and Revocation) (Scotland) Regulations 2013 (S.S.I. 2013 No. 83)
- The Food Safety (Sampling and Qualifications) (Scotland) Regulations 2013 (S.S.I. 2013 No. 84)
- The Sale of Tobacco (Display of Tobacco Products and Prices etc.) (Scotland) Regulations 2013 (S.S.I. 2013 No. 85)
- The Police Federation (Scotland) Regulations 2013 (S.S.I. 2013 No. 86)
- The Council Tax (Information-sharing in relation to Council Tax Reduction) (Scotland) Regulations 2013 (S.S.I. 2013 No. 87)
- The A9 Trunk Road (Golspie) (Prohibition of Waiting) Order 2013 (S.S.I. 2013 No. 88)
- The Police Pensions (Contributions) Amendment (Scotland) Regulations 2013 (S.S.I. 2013 No. 89)
- The Tenant Information Packs (Assured Tenancies) (Scotland) Amendment Order 2013 (S.S.I. 2013 No. 90)
- Act of Sederunt (Sheriff Court Rules) (Lay Representation) 2013 (S.S.I. 2013 No. 91)
- The Criminal Legal Aid (Fixed Payments) (Scotland) Amendment Regulations 2013 (S.S.I. 2013 No. 92)
- The Road Traffic (Permitted Parking Area and Special Parking Area) (Fife Council) Designation Order 2013 (S.S.I. 2013 No. 93)
- The Parking Attendants (Wearing of Uniforms) (Fife Council Parking Area) Regulations 2013 (S.S.I. 2013 No. 94)
- The Road Traffic (Parking Adjudicators) (Fife Council) Regulations 2013 (S.S.I. 2013 No. 95)
- The National Health Service (Optical Charges and Payments) (Scotland) Amendment Regulations 2013 (S.S.I. 2013 No. 96)
- The Scottish Fire and Rescue Service (Framework and Appointed Day for Strategic Plan) Order 2013 (S.S.I. 2013 No. 97)
- The Children's Hearings (Scotland) Act 2011 (Commencement No. 7) Order 2013 (S.S.I. 2013 No. 98 (C. 7))
- The Children's Hearings (Scotland) Act 2011 (Transfer of Children to Scotland – Effect of Orders made in England and Wales or Northern Ireland) Regulations 2013 (S.S.I. 2013 No. 99)
- The Title Conditions (Scotland) Act 2003 (Rural Housing Bodies) Amendment Order 2013 (S.S.I. 2013 No. 100)

== 101-200 ==
- The South West Scotland Trunk Roads (Temporary Prohibitions of Traffic and Overtaking and Temporary Speed Restrictions) (No. 3) Order 2013 (S.S.I. 2013 No. 101)
- The North West Scotland Trunk Roads (Temporary Prohibitions of Traffic and Overtaking and Temporary Speed Restrictions) (No. 3) Order 2013 (S.S.I. 2013 No. 102)
- The North East Scotland Trunk Roads (Temporary Prohibitions of Traffic and Overtaking and Temporary Speed Restrictions) (No. 3) Order 2013 (S.S.I. 2013 No. 103)
- The South East Scotland Trunk Roads (Temporary Prohibitions of Traffic and Overtaking and Temporary Speed Restrictions) (No. 3) Order 2013 (S.S.I. 2013 No. 104)
- The Town and Country Planning (Fees for Applications and Deemed Applications) (Scotland) Amendment Regulations 2013 (S.S.I. 2013 No. 105)
- The Tobacco and Primary Medical Services (Scotland) Act 2010 (Incidental Provision and Commencement No. 4) Order 2013 (S.S.I. 2013 No. 106 (C. 8))
- The Local Government Finance (Scotland) Amendment Order 2013 (S.S.I. 2013 No. 107)
- The Community Care (Personal Care and Nursing Care) (Scotland) Amendment Regulations 2013 (S.S.I. 2013 No. 108)
- The National Health Service Superannuation Scheme etc. (Miscellaneous Amendments) (Scotland) Regulations 2013 (S.S.I. 2013 No. 109)
- The Social Care and Social Work Improvement Scotland (Requirements for Care Services) Amendment Regulations 2013 (S.S.I. 2013 No. 110)
- Act of Sederunt (Rules of the Court of Session Amendment No. 2) (Fees of Shorthand Writers) 2013 (S.S.I. 2013 No. 111)
- Act of Sederunt (Fees of Shorthand Writers in the Sheriff Court) (Amendment) 2013 (S.S.I. 2013 No. 112)
- The Valuation (Postponement of Revaluation) (Scotland) Order 2013 (S.S.I. 2013 No. 113)
- The National Bus Travel Concession Scheme for Older and Disabled Persons (Scotland) Amendment Order 2013 (S.S.I. 2013 No. 114)
- The Aberdeen City (Electoral Arrangements) Variation Order 2013 (S.S.I. 2013 No. 115)
- The Renewables Obligation (Scotland) Amendment Order 2013 (S.S.I. 2013 No. 116)
- The Budget (Scotland) Act 2012 Amendment Order 2013 (S.S.I. 2013 No. 117)
- The Police Investigations and Review Commissioner (Investigations Procedure, Serious Incidents and Specified Weapons) Regulations 2013 (S.S.I. 2013 No. 118)
- The Police and Fire Reform (Scotland) Act 2012 (Consequential Modifications and Savings) Order 2013 (S.S.I. 2013 No. 119)
- Act of Sederunt (Rules of the Court of Session Amendment No. 3) (Miscellaneous) 2013 (S.S.I. 2013 No. 120)
- The Police and Fire Reform (Scotland) Act 2012 (Supplementary, Transitional, Transitory and Saving Provisions) Order 2013 (S.S.I. 2013 No. 121)
- The Police Service of Scotland (Amendment) Regulations 2013 (S.S.I. 2013 No. 122)
- The Action Programme for Nitrate Vulnerable Zones (Scotland) Amendment Regulations 2013 (S.S.I. 2013 No. 123)
- The Scottish Civil Justice Council and Criminal Legal Assistance Act 2013 (Commencement No. 1, Transitional and Transitory Provisions) Order 2013 (S.S.I. 2013 No. 124 (C. 9))
- The Police Service of Scotland (Amendment) (No. 2) Regulations 2013 (S.S.I. 2013 No. 125)
- The Freedom of Information (Scotland) Act 2002 (Scottish Public Authorities) Amendment Order 2013 (S.S.I. 2013 No. 126)
- The Environmental Information (Scotland) Amendment Regulations 2013 (S.S.I. 2013 No. 127)
- The Firemen's Pension Scheme (Amendment) (Scotland) Order 2013 (S.S.I. 2013 No. 128)
- The Firefighters’ Pension Scheme (Scotland) Amendment Order 2013 (S.S.I. 2013 No. 129)
- The South West Scotland Trunk Roads (Temporary Prohibitions of Traffic and Overtaking and Temporary Speed Restrictions) (No. 4) Order 2013 (S.S.I. 2013 No. 130)
- The Late Payment of Commercial Debts (Scotland) (No. 2) Regulations 2013 (S.S.I. 2013 No. 131)
- The South East Scotland Trunk Roads (Temporary Prohibitions of Traffic and Overtaking and Temporary Speed Restrictions) (No. 4) Order 2013 (S.S.I. 2013 No. 132)
- The North West Scotland Trunk Roads (Temporary Prohibitions of Traffic and Overtaking and Temporary Speed Restrictions) (No. 4) Order 2013 (S.S.I. 2013 No. 133)
- The North East Scotland Trunk Roads (Temporary Prohibitions of Traffic and Overtaking and Temporary Speed Restrictions) (No. 4) Order 2013 (S.S.I. 2013 No. 134)
- Act of Sederunt (Sheriff Court Rules) (Miscellaneous Amendments) 2013 (S.S.I. 2013 No. 135)
- The Freedom of Information (Amendment) (Scotland) Act 2013 (Commencement and Transitional Provision) Order 2013 (S.S.I. 2013 No. 136 (C. 10))
- The Welfare Reform (Consequential Amendments) (Scotland) (No. 2) Regulations 2013 (S.S.I. 2013 No. 137)
- The A82 Trunk Road (Pulpit Rock Improvement) (Temporary Prohibition of Traffic and Overtaking and Speed Restriction) Order 2013 (S.S.I. 2013 No. 138)
- Act of Sederunt (Sheriff Court Rules) (Miscellaneous Amendments) (No. 2) 2013 (S.S.I. 2013 No. 139)
- The A82 Trunk Road (Belford Road/Inverlochy Place, Fort William) (Temporary Prohibition on Waiting, Loading and Unloading) Order 2013 (S.S.I. 2013 No. 140)
- The Regulation of Care (Social Service Workers) (Scotland) Amendment Order 2013 (S.S.I. 2013 No. 141)
- The Welfare Reform (Consequential Amendments) (Scotland) (No. 3) Regulations 2013 (S.S.I. 2013 No. 142)
- The Building (Miscellaneous Amendments) (Scotland) Regulations 2013 (S.S.I. 2013 No. 143)
- The Children's Legal Assistance (Fees) (Miscellaneous Amendments) (Scotland) Regulations 2013 (S.S.I. 2013 No. 144)
- The M90/A90 Trunk Road (Charlestown to Damhead) (Temporary Prohibition of Specified Turns) Order 2013 (S.S.I. 2013 No. 145)
- The Children's Hearings (Scotland) Act 2011 (Rehabilitation of Offenders) (Transitory Provisions) Order 2013 (S.S.I. 2013 No. 146)
- The Children's Hearings (Scotland) Act 2011 (Modification of Subordinate Legislation) Order 2013 (S.S.I. 2013 No. 147)
- The Home Energy Assistance Scheme (Scotland) Regulations 2013 (S.S.I. 2013 No. 148)
- The Children's Hearings (Scotland) Act 2011 (Compulsory Supervision Orders etc.: Further Provision) Regulations 2013 (S.S.I. 2013 No. 149)
- The Children's Hearings (Scotland) Act 2011 (Transitional, Savings and Supplementary Provisions) Order 2013 (S.S.I. 2013 No. 150)
- The Animal Health (Miscellaneous Fees and Amendments) (Scotland) Regulations 2013 (S.S.I. 2013 No. 151)
- The Sheriff Court Districts Amendment Order 2013 (S.S.I. 2013 No. 152)
- The Justice of the Peace Courts (Scotland) Amendment Order 2013 (S.S.I. 2013 No. 153)
- The Town and Country Planning (Control of Advertisements) (Scotland) Amendment Regulations 2013 (S.S.I. 2013 No. 154)
- The Town and Country Planning (Development Management Procedure) (Scotland) Regulations 2013 (S.S.I. 2013 No. 155)
- The Town and Country Planning (Appeals) (Scotland) Regulations 2013 (S.S.I. 2013 No. 156)
- The Town and Country Planning (Schemes of Delegation and Local Review Procedure) (Scotland) Regulations 2013 (S.S.I. 2013 No. 157)
- The North East Scotland Trunk Roads (Temporary Prohibitions of Traffic and Overtaking and Temporary Speed Restrictions) (No. 5) Order 2013 (S.S.I. 2013 No. 158)
- The Certification of Death (Scotland) Act 2011 (Commencement No. 1) Order 2013 (S.S.I. 2013 No. 159 (C. 11))
- The Glasgow Commonwealth Games (Compensation for Enforcement Action) (Scotland) Regulations 2013 (S.S.I. 2013 No. 160)
- Act of Sederunt (Lands Valuation Appeal Court) 2013 (S.S.I. 2013 No. 161)
- Act of Sederunt (Rules of the Court of Session Amendment No. 4) (Miscellaneous) 2013 (S.S.I. 2013 No. 162)
- The Water Resources (Scotland) Act 2013 (Commencement No. 1) Order 2013 (S.S.I. 2013 No. 163 (C. 12))
- The North West Scotland Trunk Roads (Temporary Prohibitions of Traffic and Overtaking and Temporary Speed Restrictions) (No. 5) Order 2013 (S.S.I. 2013 No. 164)
- The South East Scotland Trunk Roads (Temporary Prohibitions of Traffic and Overtaking and Temporary Speed Restrictions) (No. 5) Order 2013 (S.S.I. 2013 No. 165)
- The South West Scotland Trunk Roads (Temporary Prohibitions of Traffic and Overtaking and Temporary Speed Restrictions) (No. 5) Order 2013 (S.S.I. 2013 No. 166)
- The M898/A898 Trunk Road (Erskine Bridge) (Temporary Prohibition of Traffic and 40 mph Speed Restriction) Order 2013 (S.S.I. 2013 No. 167)
- The National Health Service (Superannuation Scheme and Pension Scheme) (Scotland) Amendment (No. 2) Regulations 2013 (S.S.I. 2013 No. 168)
- The National Library of Scotland Act 2012 (Consequential Modifications) Order 2013 (S.S.I. 2013 No. 169)
- The Equality Act 2010 (Specification of Public Authorities) (Scotland) Order 2013 (S.S.I. 2013 No. 170)
- Act of Sederunt (Sheriff Court Rules) (Miscellaneous Amendments) (No. 3) 2013 (S.S.I. 2013 No. 171)
- Act of Sederunt (Children's Hearings (Scotland) Act 2011) (Miscellaneous Amendments) 2013 (S.S.I. 2013 No. 172)
- The Animal Health (Miscellaneous Amendments) (Scotland) Order 2013 (S.S.I. 2013 No. 173)
- The National Health Service Superannuation Scheme (2008 Section) (Scotland) Regulations 2013 (S.S.I. 2013 No. 174)
- The Requirements for Community Learning and Development (Scotland) Regulations 2013 (S.S.I. 2013 No. 175)
- The Water Environment (Controlled Activities) (Scotland) Amendment Regulations 2013 (S.S.I. 2013 No. 176)
- The European Union (Amendments in respect of the Accession of Croatia) (Scotland) Regulations 2013 (S.S.I. 2013 No. 177)
- The Dangerous Dogs (Fees) (Scotland) Order 2013 (S.S.I. 2013 No. 178)
- The Adam Smith College, Fife (Transfer and Closure) Order 2013 (S.S.I. 2013 No. 179)
- The Anniesland College and Langside College (Transfer and Closure) (Scotland) Order 2013 (S.S.I. 2013 No. 180)
- The James Watt College (Transfer and Closure) (Scotland) Order 2013 (S.S.I. 2013 No. 181)
- The Kilmarnock College (Transfer and Closure) (Scotland) Order 2013 (S.S.I. 2013 No. 182)
- The Reid Kerr College (Transfer and Closure) (Scotland) Order 2013 (S.S.I. 2013 No. 183)
- The Police Reform (Pensions Amendments) (Scotland) Regulations 2013 (S.S.I. 2013 No. 184)
- The Firemen's Pension Scheme (Amendment) (Scotland) (No. 2) Order 2013 (S.S.I. 2013 No. 185)
- The Fire Reform (Pensions Amendments) (Scotland) Order 2013 (S.S.I. 2013 No. 186)
- The Plant Health (Scotland) Amendment (No. 2) Order 2013 (S.S.I. 2013 No. 187)
- The Mobile Homes (Written Statement) (Scotland) Regulations 2013 (S.S.I. 2013 No. 188)
- The Sea Fishing (Illegal, unreported and unregulated fishing) (Scotland) Order 2013 (S.S.I. 2013 No. 189)
- The Children's Hearings (Scotland) Act 2011 (Commencement No. 8) Order 2013 (S.S.I. 2013 No. 190 (C. 13))
- The National Health Service (Free Prescriptions and Charges for Drugs and Appliances) (Scotland) Amendment Regulations 2013 (S.S.I. 2013 No. 191)
- The Public Services Reform (Scotland) Act 2010 Modification Order 2013 (S.S.I. 2013 No. 192)
- The Children's Hearings (Scotland) Act 2011 (Review of Contact Directions and Definition of Relevant Person) Order 2013 (S.S.I. 2013 No. 193)
- The Children's Hearings (Scotland) Act 2011 (Rules of Procedure in Children's Hearings) Rules 2013 (S.S.I. 2013 No. 194)
- The Children's Hearings (Scotland) Act 2011 (Commencement No. 9) Order 2013 (S.S.I. 2013 No. 195 (C. 14))
- Act of Adjournal (Criminal Procedure Rules Amendment No. 2) (Sexual Offences Act 2003) (Notification Requirements) 2013 (S.S.I. 2013 No. 196)
- Public Services Reform (Commissioner for Ethical Standards in Public Life in Scotland etc.) Order 2013 (SSI 2013/197)
- Act of Adjournal (Criminal Procedure Rules Amendment No. 3) (Miscellaneous) 2013 (S.S.I. 2013 No. 198)
- The Sale of Alcohol to Children and Young Persons (Scotland) Amendment Regulations 2013 (S.S.I. 2013 No. 199)
- The Children's Legal Assistance (Scotland) Regulations 2013 (S.S.I. 2013 No. 200)

== 201-300 ==
- The Public Health etc. (Scotland) Act 2008 (Sunbed) Amendment Regulations 2013 (S.S.I. 2013 No. 201)
- The Sale of Tobacco (Prescribed Documents) (Scotland) Regulations 2013 (S.S.I. 2013 No. 202)
- The Protection of Vulnerable Groups (Scotland) Act 2007 (Modification of Regulated Work with Children) (Children's Hearings) Order 2013 (S.S.I. 2013 No. 203)
- The Rehabilitation of Offenders Act 1974 (Exclusions and Exceptions) (Scotland) Amendment Order 2013 (S.S.I. 2013 No. 204)
- The Secure Accommodation (Scotland) Regulations 2013 (S.S.I. 2013 No. 205)
- The South West Scotland Trunk Roads (Temporary Prohibitions of Traffic and Overtaking and Temporary Speed Restrictions) (No. 6) Order 2013 (S.S.I. 2013 No. 206)
- The M8 Motorway (Junction 21, Seaward Street) (Width Restriction) Order 2013 (S.S.I. 2013 No. 207)
- The South East Scotland Trunk Roads (Temporary Prohibitions of Traffic and Overtaking and Temporary Speed Restrictions) (No. 6) Order 2013 (S.S.I. 2013 No. 208)
- The North East Scotland Trunk Roads (Temporary Prohibitions of Traffic and Overtaking and Temporary Speed Restrictions) (No. 6) Order 2013 (S.S.I. 2013 No. 209)
- The Children's Hearings (Scotland) Act 2011 (Movement Restriction Conditions) Regulations 2013 (S.S.I. 2013 No. 210)
- The Children's Hearings (Scotland) Act 2011 (Modification of Primary Legislation) Order 2013 (S.S.I. 2013 No. 211)
- The Children's Hearings (Scotland) Act 2011 (Implementation of Secure Accommodation Authorisation) (Scotland) Regulations 2013 (S.S.I. 2013 No. 212)
- The North West Scotland Trunk Roads (Temporary Prohibitions of Traffic and Overtaking and Temporary Speed Restrictions) (No. 6) Order 2013 (S.S.I. 2013 No. 213)
- The Criminal Justice and Licensing (Scotland) Act 2010 (Commencement No. 11 and Saving Provision) Order 2013 (S.S.I. 2013 No. 214 (C. 15))
- The Vulnerable Witnesses (Giving evidence in relation to the determination of Children's Hearing grounds: Authentication of Prior Statements) (Scotland) Regulations 2013 (S.S.I. 2013 No. 215)
- The Sexual Offences Act 2003 (Notification Requirements) (Scotland) Regulations 2013 (S.S.I. 2013 No. 216)
- The Contaminants in Food (Scotland) Regulations 2013 (S.S.I. 2013 No. 217)
- The Council Tax Reduction (Scotland) Amendment (No. 2) Regulations 2013 (S.S.I. 2013 No. 218)
- The Mobile Homes Act 1983 (Amendment of Schedule 1) (Scotland) Order 2013 (S.S.I. 2013 No. 219)
- The Public Services Reform (Functions of the Common Services Agency for the Scottish Health Service) (Scotland) Order 2013 (S.S.I. 2013 No. 220)
- The Specified Products from China (Restriction on First Placing on the Market) (Scotland) Amendment Regulations 2013 (S.S.I. 2013 No. 221)
- The Landfill (Scotland) Amendment Regulations 2013 (S.S.I. 2013 No. 222)
- The A83 Trunk Road (Poltalloch Street, Lochgilphead) (Temporary Prohibition On Use of Road) Order 2013 (S.S.I. 2013 No. 223)
- The M90/A90 Trunk Road (Gairneybridge to Milnathort) (Temporary 50 mph and 30 mph Speed Restrictions) Order 2013 (S.S.I. 2013 No. 224)
- The Debt Arrangement Scheme (Scotland) Amendment Regulations 2013 (S.S.I. 2013 No. 225)
- The Glasgow City Council Shawfield Dalmarnock Smartbridge Public Road Scheme 2013 Confirmation Instrument 2013 (S.S.I. 2013 No. 226)
- The Registration of Social Workers and Social Service Workers in Care Services (Scotland) Regulations 2013 (S.S.I. 2013 No. 227)
- The Football Banning Orders (Regulated Football Matches) (Scotland) Order 2013 (S.S.I. 2013 No. 228)
- The Sports Grounds and Sporting Events (Designation) (Scotland) Amendment (No. 2) Order 2013 (S.S.I. 2013 No. 229)
- The Highland Council Rum Harbour Revision (Transfer) Order 2013 (S.S.I. 2013 No. 230)
- The A738 Trunk Road (Kilwinning) (Temporary Prohibition on Waiting and Use of Road) Order 2013 (S.S.I. 2013 No. 231)
- The South West Scotland Trunk Roads (Temporary Prohibitions of Traffic and Overtaking and Temporary Speed Restrictions) (No. 7) Order 2013 (S.S.I. 2013 No. 232)
- The South East Scotland Trunk Roads (Temporary Prohibitions of Traffic and Overtaking and Temporary Speed Restrictions) (No. 7) Order 2013 (S.S.I. 2013 No. 233)
- The North West Scotland Trunk Roads (Temporary Prohibitions of Traffic and Overtaking and Temporary Speed Restrictions) (No. 7) Order 2013 (S.S.I. 2013 No. 234)
- The North East Scotland Trunk Roads (Temporary Prohibitions of Traffic and Overtaking and Temporary Speed Restrictions) (No. 7) Order 2013 (S.S.I. 2013 No. 235)
- Act of Sederunt (Registration Appeal Court) 2013 (S.S.I. 2013 No. 236)
- The A7 Trunk Road (High Street and Townhead, Langholm) (Temporary Prohibition On Use of Road) Order 2013 (S.S.I. 2013 No. 237)
- Act of Sederunt (Rules of the Court of Session Amendment No. 5) (Miscellaneous) 2013 (S.S.I. 2013 No. 238)
- The Council Tax Reduction (Scotland) Amendment (No. 3) Regulations 2013 (S.S.I. 2013 No. 239)
- The A85 Trunk Road (Perth Road/East High Street/High Street, Crieff) (Highland Gathering) (Temporary Prohibition On Use of Road) Order 2013 (S.S.I. 2013 No. 240)
- Act of Sederunt (Summary Applications, Statutory Applications and Appeals etc. Rules Amendment) (Policing and Crime Act 2009) 2013 (S.S.I. 2013 No. 241)
- The A85 Trunk Road (Perth Road/East High Street/High Street, Crieff) (Pipe Band Championship) (Temporary Prohibition On Use of Road) Order 2013 (S.S.I. 2013 No. 242)
- The South West Scotland Trunk Roads (Temporary Prohibitions of Traffic and Overtaking and Temporary Speed Restrictions) (No. 8) Order 2013 (S.S.I. 2013 No. 243)
- The South East Scotland Trunk Roads (Temporary Prohibitions of Traffic and Overtaking and Temporary Speed Restrictions) (No. 8) Order 2013 (S.S.I. 2013 No. 244)
- The North West Scotland Trunk Roads (Temporary Prohibitions of Traffic and Overtaking and Temporary Speed Restrictions) (No. 8) Order 2013 (S.S.I. 2013 No. 245)
- The North East Scotland Trunk Roads (Temporary Prohibitions of Traffic and Overtaking and Temporary Speed Restrictions) (No. 8) Order 2013 (S.S.I. 2013 No. 246)
- The Civil Contingencies Act 2004 (Contingency Planning) (Scotland) Amendment Regulations 2013 (S.S.I. 2013 No. 247)
- The M898/A898 Trunk Road (Erskine Bridge) (Temporary Prohibition of Traffic and 40 mph Speed Restriction) (No. 2) Order 2013 (S.S.I. 2013 No. 248)
- The Aquaculture and Fisheries (Scotland) Act 2013 (Commencement and Transitional Provisions) Order 2013 (S.S.I. 2013 No. 249 (C. 16))
- The Legal Aid and Advice and Assistance (Photocopying Fees and Welfare Reform) (Miscellaneous Amendments) (Scotland) Regulations 2013 (S.S.I. 2013 No. 250)
- The A92 Trunk Road (Leuchars) (Temporary 30 mph Speed Restriction) Order 2013 (S.S.I. 2013 No. 251)
- The Water Environment and Water Services (Scotland) Act 2003 (Commencement No. 9) Order 2013 (S.S.I. 2013 No. 252 (C. 17))
- The Home Energy Assistance Scheme (Scotland) Amendment Regulations 2013 (S.S.I. 2013 No. 253)
- The Marine Navigation Act 2013 (Commencement) (Scotland) Order 2013 (S.S.I. 2013 No. 254 (C. 18))
- The A85 Trunk Road (Crieff) (Temporary Prohibition on Waiting, Loading and Unloading) Order 2013 (S.S.I. 2013 No. 255)
- The Fish Labelling (Scotland) Regulations 2013 (S.S.I. 2013 No. 256)
- The A85 Trunk Road (Comrie) (Temporary Prohibition on Waiting, Loading and Unloading) Order 2013 (S.S.I. 2013 No. 257)
- The Glasgow Commonwealth Games (Enforcement Officers) Regulations 2013 (S.S.I. 2013 No. 258)
- The Glasgow Commonwealth Games (Games Locations) Order 2013 (S.S.I. 2013 No. 259)
- The Glasgow Commonwealth Games Act 2008 (Commencement No. 4) Order 2013 (S.S.I. 2013 No. 260 (C. 19))
- The Personal Licence (Training) (Scotland) Regulations 2013 (S.S.I. 2013 No. 261)
- The Scottish Civil Justice Council and Criminal Legal Assistance Act 2013 (Commencement No. 2) Order 2013 (S.S.I. 2013 No. 262 (C. 20))
- The A7 Trunk Road (Lindean Mill Junction to the B6360 Abbotsford House Junction) (Temporary 30 mph Speed Restriction) Order 2013 (S.S.I. 2013 No. 263)
- The Overhead Lines (Exemption) (Scotland) Regulations 2013 (S.S.I. 2013 No. 264)
- The Common Agricultural Policy Single Farm Payment and Support Schemes (Scotland) Amendment Regulations 2013 (S.S.I. 2013 No. 265)
- The Food Additives, Flavourings, Enzymes and Extraction Solvents (Scotland) Regulations 2013 (S.S.I. 2013 No. 266)
- The Angus College (Transfer and Closure) (Scotland) Order 2013 (S.S.I. 2013 No. 267)
- The Banff and Buchan College of Further Education (Transfer and Closure) (Scotland) Order 2013 (S.S.I. 2013 No. 268)
- The Cumbernauld College (Transfer and Closure) (Scotland) Order 2013 (S.S.I. 2013 No. 269)
- The John Wheatley College and Stow College (Transfer and Closure) (Scotland) Order 2013 (S.S.I. 2013 No. 270)
- The Scottish Civil Justice Council and Criminal Legal Assistance Act 2013 (Commencement No. 2) Amendment Order 2013 (S.S.I. 2013 No. 271 (C. 21))
- The South West Scotland Trunk Roads (Temporary Prohibitions of Traffic and Overtaking and Temporary Speed Restrictions) (No. 9) Order 2013 (S.S.I. 2013 No. 272)
- The South East Scotland Trunk Roads (Temporary Prohibitions of Traffic and Overtaking and Temporary Speed Restrictions) (No. 9) Order 2013 (S.S.I. 2013 No. 273)
- The North West Scotland Trunk Roads (Temporary Prohibitions of Traffic and Overtaking and Temporary Speed Restrictions) (No. 9) Order 2013 (S.S.I. 2013 No. 274)
- The North East Scotland Trunk Roads (Temporary Prohibitions of Traffic and Overtaking and Temporary Speed Restrictions) (No. 9) Order 2013 (S.S.I. 2013 No. 275)
- The Marine (Scotland) Act 2010 (Commencement No. 3 and Consequential Provisions) Order 2013 (S.S.I. 2013 No. 276 (C. 22))
- The Town and Country Planning (Marine Fish Farming) (Scotland) Regulations 2013 (S.S.I. 2013 No. 277)
- (S.S.I. 2013 No. 277)
- The Freedom of Information (Scotland) Act 2002 (Designation of Persons as Scottish Public Authorities) Order 2013 (S.S.I. 2013 No. 278)
- The Bee Keeping (Colonsay and Oronsay) Order 2013 (S.S.I. 2013 No. 279)
- The Loch Sligachan, Isle of Skye, Scallops Several Fishery Order 2013 (S.S.I. 2013 No. 280)
- The Post-16 Education (Scotland) Act 2013 (Commencement No. 1) Order 2013 (S.S.I. 2013 No. 281 (C. 23))
- The Public Contracts (Scotland) Amendment Regulations 2013 (S.S.I. 2013 No. 282)
- The A82 Trunk Road (Dumbarton) (40 mph Speed Limit) Variation Order 2013 (S.S.I. 2013 No. 283)
- The A92/A972 Trunk Road (Balfarg Junction) (Temporary Prohibition of Specified Turns) Order 2013 (S.S.I. 2013 No. 284)
- The A6091/A7 Trunk Road (Buccleuch Road and Buccleuch Street, Hawick) (Temporary Prohibition on Waiting, Loading and Unloading) Order 2013 (S.S.I. 2013 No. 285)
- The Marine Licensing (Pre-application Consultation) (Scotland) Regulations 2013 (S.S.I. 2013 No. 286)
- The Council Tax Reduction (Scotland) Amendment (No. 4) Regulations 2013 (S.S.I. 2013 No. 287)
- The Rosyth International Container Terminal (Harbour Revision) Order 2013 (S.S.I. 2013 No. 288)
- The Title Conditions (Scotland) Act 2003 (Conservation Bodies) Amendment Order 2013 (S.S.I. 2013 No. 289)
- The Glasgow Commonwealth Games (Trading and Advertising) (Scotland) Regulations 2013 (S.S.I. 2013 No. 290)
- Act of Sederunt (Commissary Business) 2013 (S.S.I. 2013 No. 291)
- The National Health Service (Cross-Border Health Care) (Scotland) Regulations 2013 (S.S.I. 2013 No. 292)
- Act of Sederunt (Summary Applications, Statutory Applications and Appeals etc. Rules Amendment) (Miscellaneous) 2013 (S.S.I. 2013 No. 293)
- Act of Sederunt (Rules of the Court of Session Amendment No. 6) (Miscellaneous) 2013 (S.S.I. 2013 No. 294)
- The A96 Trunk Road (Inveramsay Bridge Improvement) (Trunking and Detrunking) Order 2013 (S.S.I. 2013 No. 295)
- The A96 Trunk Road (Inveramsay Bridge Improvement) (Side Roads) Order 2013 (S.S.I. 2013 No. 296)
- The A9 Trunk Road (Ballinluig) (Temporary Prohibition of Specified Turns) Order 2013 (S.S.I. 2013 No. 297)
- The South West Scotland Trunk Roads (Temporary Prohibitions of Traffic and Overtaking and Temporary Speed Restrictions) (No. 10) Order 2013 (S.S.I. 2013 No. 298)
- The North East Scotland Trunk Roads (Temporary Prohibitions of Traffic and Overtaking and Temporary Speed Restrictions) (No. 10) Order 2013 (S.S.I. 2013 No. 299)
- The North West Scotland Trunk Roads (Temporary Prohibitions of Traffic and Overtaking and Temporary Speed Restrictions) (No. 10) Order 2013 (S.S.I. 2013 No. 300)

== 301-400 ==
- The South East Scotland Trunk Roads (Temporary Prohibitions of Traffic and Overtaking and Temporary Speed Restrictions) (No. 10) Order 2013 (S.S.I. 2013 No. 301)
- The Drugs Courts (Scotland) Amendment Order 2013 (S.S.I. 2013 No. 302)
- The Growth and Infrastructure Act 2013 (Commencement) (Scotland) Order 2013 (S.S.I. 2013 No. 303 (C. 24))
- The Electricity Generating Stations (Applications for Variation of Consent) (Scotland) Regulations 2013 (S.S.I. 2013 No. 304)
- The Fruit Juices and Fruit Nectars (Scotland) Regulations 2013 (S.S.I. 2013 No. 305)
- The A96 Trunk Road (Church Road, Keith) (Temporary Prohibition On Use of Road) Order 2013 (S.S.I. 2013 No. 306)
- The Animal By-Products (Enforcement) (Scotland) Regulations 2013 (S.S.I. 2013 No. 307)
- The Whitehills Harbour and Marina (Constitution) Order 2013 (S.S.I. 2013 No. 308)
- The Rural Development Contracts (Land Managers Options) (Scotland) Amendment Regulations 2013 (revoked) (S.S.I. 2013 No. 309)
- The Adoption (Recognition of Overseas Adoptions) (Scotland) Regulations 2013 (S.S.I. 2013 No. 310)
- The Road Traffic (Permitted Parking Area and Special Parking Area) (East Dunbartonshire Council) Designation Order 2013 (S.S.I. 2013 No. 311)
- The Road Traffic (Parking Adjudicators) (East Dunbartonshire Council) Regulations 2013 (S.S.I. 2013 No. 312)
- The Parking Attendants (Wearing of Uniforms) (East Dunbartonshire Council Parking Area) Regulations 2013 (S.S.I. 2013 No. 313)
- The Flood Risk Management (Designated Responsible Authorities) (Scotland) Order 2013 (S.S.I. 2013 No. 314)
- The Litter (Fixed Penalties) (Scotland) Order 2013 (S.S.I. 2013 No. 315)
- The M90/A90 Trunk Road (Great Western Road) (Temporary Prohibition of Specified Turn) Order 2013 (S.S.I. 2013 No. 316)
- Act of Sederunt (Rules of the Court of Session Amendment No. 7) (Miscellaneous) 2013 (S.S.I. 2013 No. 317)
- The Protected Trust Deeds (Scotland) Regulations 2013 (S.S.I. 2013 No. 318)
- The Fundable Bodies (Scotland) Order 2013 (S.S.I. 2013 No. 319)
- The Criminal Legal Aid (Scotland) (Fees) Amendment Regulations 2013 (S.S.I. 2013 No. 320)
- The Pollution Prevention and Control (Designation of Energy Efficiency Directive) (Scotland) Order 2013 (revoked) (S.S.I. 2013 No. 321)
- The Long Leases (Scotland) Act 2012 (Commencement No. 1) Order 2013 (S.S.I. 2013 No. 322 (C. 25))
- The Water Environment (River Basin Management Planning: Further Provision) (Scotland) Regulations 2013 (S.S.I. 2013 No. 323)
- The Water Environment (Shellfish Water Protected Areas: Designation) (Scotland) Order 2013 (S.S.I. 2013 No. 324)
- The Water Environment (Shellfish Water Protected Areas: Environmental Objectives etc.) (Scotland) Regulations 2013 (S.S.I. 2013 No. 325)
- The Seed (Scotland) (Miscellaneous Amendments) Regulations 2013 (S.S.I. 2013 No. 326)
- The National Health Service (Travelling Expenses and Remission of Charges) (Scotland) (No. 2) Amendment Regulations 2013 (S.S.I. 2013 No. 327)
- The Budget (Scotland) Act 2013 Amendment Order 2013 (S.S.I. 2013 No. 328)
- The South West Scotland Trunk Roads (Temporary Prohibitions of Traffic and Overtaking and Temporary Speed Restrictions) (No. 11) Order 2013 (S.S.I. 2013 No. 329)
- The South East Scotland Trunk Roads (Temporary Prohibitions of Traffic and Overtaking and Temporary Speed Restrictions) (No. 11) Order 2013 (S.S.I. 2013 No. 330)
- The North West Scotland Trunk Roads (Temporary Prohibitions of Traffic and Overtaking and Temporary Speed Restrictions) (No. 11) Order 2013 (S.S.I. 2013 No. 331)
- The North East Scotland Trunk Roads (Temporary Prohibitions of Traffic and Overtaking and Temporary Speed Restrictions) (No. 11) Order 2013 (S.S.I. 2013 No. 332)
- The Food Safety, Food Hygiene and Official Controls (Sprouting Seeds) (Scotland) Regulations 2013 (S.S.I. 2013 No. 333)
- The Health Boards (Membership) (Scotland) Regulations 2013 (S.S.I. 2013 No. 334)
- The Adoption (Recognition of Overseas Adoptions) (Scotland) Amendment Regulations 2013 (S.S.I. 2013 No. 335)
- The Food (Miscellaneous Amendments) (Scotland) Regulations 2013 (S.S.I. 2013 No. 336)
- The Bovine Viral Diarrhoea (Scotland) Amendment (No. 2) Order 2013 (S.S.I. 2013 No. 337)
- The A77 Trunk Road (Dalrymple Street Girvan) (Temporary Prohibition On Use of Road) Order 2013 (S.S.I. 2013 No. 338)
- The Defamation Act 2013 (Commencement) (Scotland) Order 2013 (S.S.I. 2013 No. 339 (C. 26))
- The Feed (Hygiene and Enforcement) and Animal Feed (Scotland) Amendment Regulations 2013 (S.S.I. 2013 No. 340)
- The Sexual Offences (Scotland) Act 2009 (Commencement No. 2) Order 2013 (S.S.I. 2013 No. 341 (C. 27))
- The Water Resources (Scotland) Act 2013 (Commencement No. 2) Order 2013 (S.S.I. 2013 No. 342 (C. 28))
- The A9 Trunk Road (Blair Atholl Junction) (Temporary Prohibition on Use of Road) Order 2013 (S.S.I. 2013 No. 343)
- The A96 Trunk Road (Inverurie Road/Auchmill Road/Great Northern Road) (Redetermination of Means of Exercise of Public Right of Passage) Order 2013 (S.S.I. 2013 No. 344)
- Act of Sederunt (Fees of Sheriff Officers) 2013 (S.S.I. 2013 No. 345)
- Act of Sederunt (Fees of Messengers-at-Arms) 2013 (S.S.I. 2013 No. 346)
- The National Health Service (Variation of Areas of Health Boards) (Scotland) Order 2013 (S.S.I. 2013 No. 347)
- The Post-16 Education (Scotland) Act 2013 (Commencement No. 2) Order 2013 (S.S.I. 2013 No. 348 (C. 29))
- The Environmental Protection (Restriction on Use of Lead Shot) (Scotland) Amendment Regulations 2013 (S.S.I. 2013 No. 349)
- The Town and Country Planning (Prescribed Date) (Scotland) Regulations 2013 (S.S.I. 2013 No. 350)
- The Local Governance (Scotland) Act 2004 (Remuneration) Amendment Regulations 2013 (S.S.I. 2013 No. 351)
- The A702 Trunk Road (Biggar High Street) (Temporary Prohibition On Use of Road) Order 2013 (S.S.I. 2013 No. 352)
- The A85 Trunk Road (Comrie) (Temporary Prohibition On Use of Road) Order 2013 (S.S.I. 2013 No. 353)
- The Colleges of Further Education (Transfer and Closure) (Scotland) Order 2013 (S.S.I. 2013 No. 354)
- The National Health Service (General Ophthalmic Services) (Scotland) Amendment Regulations 2013 (S.S.I. 2013 No. 355)
- The Land Reform (Scotland) Act 2003 (Modification) Order 2013 (S.S.I. 2013 No. 356)
- The Register of Young Voters (Anonymous Entries) (Scotland) Order 2013 (S.S.I. 2013 No. 357)
- The North East Scotland Trunk Roads (Temporary Prohibitions of Traffic and Overtaking and Temporary Speed Restrictions) (No. 12) Order 2013 (S.S.I. 2013 No. 358)
- The South West Scotland Trunk Roads (Temporary Prohibitions of Traffic and Overtaking and Temporary Speed Restrictions) (No. 12) Order 2013 (S.S.I. 2013 No. 359)
- The South East Scotland Trunk Roads (Temporary Prohibitions of Traffic and Overtaking and Temporary Speed Restrictions) (No. 12) Order 2013 (S.S.I. 2013 No. 360)
- The North West Scotland Trunk Roads (Temporary Prohibitions of Traffic and Overtaking and Temporary Speed Restrictions) (No. 12) Order 2013 (S.S.I. 2013 No. 361)
- The Scottish Charitable Incorporated Organisations (Removal from Register and Dissolution) Amendment Regulations 2013 (S.S.I. 2013 No. 362)
- The Bovine Viral Diarrhoea (Scotland) Amendment (No. 3) Order 2013 (S.S.I. 2013 No. 363)
- The Health Boards (Membership and Elections) (Scotland) Order 2013 (S.S.I. 2013 No. 364)
- The Freedom of Information (Scotland) Act 2002 (Historical Periods) Order 2013 (S.S.I. 2013 No. 365)
- The Plant Health (Scotland) Amendment (No. 3) Order 2013 (revoked) (S.S.I. 2013 No. 366)
