= Censorship of LGBTQ issues =

Censorship of LGBTQ issues is practised by some countries around the world. It may take a variety of forms, including anti-LGBTQ curriculum laws in some states of the United States and the Russian anti-LGBTQ law prohibiting the "promotion of non-traditional sexual relationships or gender reassignment".

== Anti-"LGBTQ propaganda" laws ==
The table below lists, in chronological order, the United Nations member states that have passed laws explicitly prohibiting "propaganda of homosexuality and non-heterosexual orientation".

#	Country	Date	Long title
1	Russia	1 July 2013	For the purpose of protecting children from information advocating a denial of traditional family values
2	Hungary	1 July 2021	On taking more severe actions against pedophile offenders and amending certain acts for the protection of children
3	Bulgaria	16 August 2024	On amending and supplementing the law on school education
4	(Georgia (country)) Georgia	3 October 2024	On family values and protection of minors
5	Kazakhstan	1 January 2026	On introducing changes and additions to some legislative acts of the Republic of Kazakhstan on matters of archival affairs and restrictions on the distribution of illegal content
6	Belarus	19 June 2026	On amendments to the codes of the Republic of Belarus on administrative liability issues

Several countries criminalize same-sex sexual activity while also maintaining specific 'promotion of homosexuality' statutes.

#	Country	Date	Long title
1	Nigeria	7 January 2014	An act to make provisions for the prohibition of relationship between persons of the same sex, celebration of marriage by them, and for other matters connected therewith
2	Uganda	30 May 2023	An act to prohibit any form of sexual relations between persons of the same sex; to prohibit the promotion or recognition of sexual relations between persons of the same sex; and for related matters.
3	Burkina Faso	11 July 2024	Law No. 024-2024/ALT of July 11, 2024, establishing the Penal Code.
4	Mali	13 December 2024	Law No. 2024-027 of December 13, 2024, establishing the Penal Code.
5	Senegal	30 March 2026	Law No. 2026-15 of March 27, 2026, amending Law No. 65-60 of July 21, 1965, establishing the Penal Code.

=== Belarus ===
English translation:

Article 19.16. Section 1: The dissemination in any form of information aimed at forming in the public an impression of the attractiveness of homosexual relations, gender reassignment, childlessness, or the recognition of the acceptability of pedophilia

Section 2: The same actions committed through the use of the internet, mass media, or other public platforms, or in a manner that makes such information accessible to minors shall entail the imposition of a fine in the amount of 30 to 50 base units, or administrative arrest, or community service.

Original text (Belarusian):

Артыкул 19.16. Чыстка 1: Распаўсюджванне ў любой форме інфармацыі, накіраванай на фарміраванне ў грамадстве ўяўлення аб прывабнасці гомасексуальных адносін, змены полу, бяздетнасці або прызнанне дапушчальнасці педафіліі

Чыстка 2. Тыя ж дзеянні, учыненыя з выкарыстаннем сеткі Інтэрнэт, сродкаў масавай інфармацыі або іншых публічных платформ, альбо спосабам, які робіць такую інфармацыю даступнай для непаўналетніх цягнуць накладанне штрафу ў памеры ад трыццаці да пяцідзесяці базавых велічынь, або адміністрацыйны арышт, або грамадскія работы.

=== Bulgaria ===
English translation:

Article 11 (2): In the system of pre-school and school education, it is prohibited to carry out activities related to: Carrying out propaganda, promotion, or incitement in any way, directly or indirectly, of ideas and views related to non-traditional sexual orientation and/or the definition of a gender identity other than the biological one.

§ 1, Item 16: "Non-traditional sexual orientation" means concepts of emotional, romantic, sexual, or sensual attraction between persons of the same sex that are different from the generally accepted and established notions in the Bulgarian legal tradition.

Original text (Bulgarian):

Член 11 (2): В системата на предучилищното и училищното образование се забраняват дейности, свързани с: Извършване на пропаганда, популяризиране или подстрекаване по какъвто и да е начин, пряко или косвено, на идеи и възгледи, свързани с нетрадиционна сексуална ориენтация и/или определяне на полова идентичност, различна от биологичната.

§ 1, т. 16: "Нетрадиционна сексуална ориентация" са различни от общоприетите и заложените в българската правна традиция схващания за емоционално, романтично, сексуално или чувствено привличане между лица от противоположни полове.

=== Georgia ===
English translation:

Article 3: Popularization shall be considered information or action aimed at portraying a relationship between representatives of the same biological sex, or belonging to a sex different from one's biological sex, as positive and/or worthy of imitation.

Article 10: A broadcaster is prohibited from broadcasting information aimed at the popularization of a person's assignment to a sex different from their biological sex, or a relationship between representatives of the same biological sex expressed by sexual orientation.

Article 11: It is prohibited to hold public assemblies or manifestations aimed at popularizing a person's assignment to a sex different from their biological sex, or a relationship between representatives of the same biological sex.

Original text (Georgian):

მუხლი 3: "პოპულარიზაციად" მიიჩნევა ინფორმაცია/ქმედება, რომელიც... ერთი და იმავე ბიოლოგიური სქესის წარმომადგენლებს შორის ურთიერთობას ან საკუთარი ბიოლოგიური სქესისგან განსხვავებული სქესისთვის მიკუთვნებას დადებითად ან/და მისაბაძად წარმოაჩენს.

მუხლი 10: მაუწყებლისთვის აკრძალულია ისეთი ინფორმაციის გადაცემა, რომელიც მიმართულია ადამიანის თავისი ბიოლოგიური სქესისგან განსხვავებული სქესისთვის მიკუთვნების ან ერთი და იმავე ბიოლოგიური სქესის წარმომადგენლებს შორის სექსუალური ორიენტაციის ნიშნით გამოხატული ურთიერთობის პოპულარიზაციისკენ.

მუხლი 11: აკრძალულია ისეთი საჯარო შეკრების ან მანიფესტაციის ჩატარება, რომელიც მიმართულია ადამიანის თავისი ბიოლოგიური სქესისგან განსხვავებული სქესისთვის მიკუთვნების ან ერთი და იმავე ბიოლოგიური სქესის წარმომადგენლებს შორის ურთიერთობის პოპულარიზაციისკენ.

=== Hungary ===
English translation:

Section 6/A: In order to ensure the fulfillment of the objectives set out in this Act and the implementation of the rights of the child, it is prohibited to make accessible to persons who have not attained the age of eighteen years content that: Propagates or portrays divergence from self-identity corresponding to sex at birth, sex change, or homosexuality.

Section 9(6): A program which is capable of adversely affecting the physical, mental, or moral development of minors, in particular because its dominant element is... content promoting or portraying divergence from self-identity corresponding to sex at birth, sex change, or homosexuality... shall be classified as falling into Category V (Not recommended for minors).

Original text (Hungarian):

6/A. § E törvényben meghatározott célok elérése, valamint a gyermekek jogainak érvényesülése érdekében tilos tizennyolc éven aluliak számára olyan tartalmat elérhetővé tenni, amely: Vagy a születési nemnek megfelelő önazonosságtól való eltérést, a nem megváltoztatását, valamint a homoszexualitást népszerűsíti vagy jeleníti meg.

9. § (6) Az olyan műsorszám, amely alkalmas a kiskorúak fizikai, szellemi vagy erkölcsi fejlődésének kedvezőtlen befolyásolására, különösen azáltal, hogy meghatározó eleme... a születési nemnek megfelelő önazonosságtól való eltérést, a nem megváltoztatását, valamint a homoszexualitást népszerűsíti vagy jeleníti meg... az V. kategóriába (tizennyolc éven aluliak számára nem ajánlott) kell sorolni.

=== Kazakhstan ===
English translation:

Article 16: The dissemination of information containing propaganda of pedophilia and/or non-traditional sexual orientation in public spaces, as well as through the media, telecommunications networks, and online platforms, is prohibited.

Original text (Kazakh):

16-бап: Қоғамдық орындарда, сондай-ақ бұқаралық ақпарат құралдарында, телекоммуникациялар желілерінде және онлайн-платформаларда педофилияны және (немесе) дәстүрлі емес сексуалдық ориентацияны насихаттауды қамтитын ақпаратты таратуға тыйым салынады.

=== Russia ===
English translation

Article 6.21: Propaganda of non-traditional sexual relations and (or) preferences or gender reassignment, expressed in the distribution of information and (or) the performance of public actions aimed at forming non-traditional sexual predispositions, the attractiveness of non-traditional sexual relations and (or) preferences or gender reassignment, or a distorted idea of the social equivalence of traditional and non-traditional sexual relations and (or) preferences, or the imposition of information about non-traditional sexual relations and (or) preferences or gender reassignment that causes interest in such relations and (or) preferences or gender reassignment.

Original text (Russian):

Статья 6.21: Пропаганда нетрадиционных сексуальных отношений и (или) предпочтений либо смены пола, выразившаяся в распространении информации и (или) совершении публичных действий, направленных на формирование нетрадиционных сексуальных установок, привлекательности нетрадиционных сексуальных отношений и (или) предпочтений либо смены пола или искаженного представления о социальной равноценности традиционных и нетрадиционных сексуальных отношений и (или) предпочтений, либо навязывание информации о нетрадиционных сексуальных отношениях и (или) предпочтениях либо смене пола, вызывающей интерес к таким отношениям и (или) предпочтениям либо смене пола.

=== Nigeria ===
Original text (English):

Section 5. Offences and Penalties:

(2) A person who registers, operates or participates in gay clubs, societies and organisation, or directly or indirectly makes public show of same-sex amorous relationship in Nigeria commits an offence and is liable on conviction to a term of 10 years imprisonment.

=== Uganda ===
Original text (English):

Section 11. Promotion of homosexuality (1) A person who: (a) participates in production, procuring, marketing, broadcasting, disseminating, publishing of pornographic materials for purposes of promoting homosexuality; (b) provides financial support for purposes of promoting homosexuality; (c) offers premises and other fixed assets for purposes of homosexuality or promoting homosexuality; (d) uses electronic devices, including internet, films, mobile phones for purposes of homosexuality or promoting homosexuality; or (e) advertises, publishes, prints, broadcasts, distributes by any means, any material promoting or encouraging homosexuality;

commits an offence and is liable, on conviction, to imprisonment for a period not exceeding twenty years.

=== Burkina Faso ===
English translation:

Article 533-11: Anyone who, by any means of communication, makes an apology for, promotes, or incites the practice of homosexuality or any other unnatural act, shall be punished by imprisonment of 2 to 5 years and a fine of 500,000 to 2,000,000 CFA francs.

Original text (French):

Article 533-11: Quiconque, par un moyen de communication quelconque, fait l'apologie, assure la promotion ou incite à la pratique de l'homosexualité ou de tout autre acte contre nature, est puni d'une peine d'emprisonnement de deux à cinq ans et d'une amende de 500 000 à 2 000 000 de francs CFA.

=== Mali ===
English translation:

Article 224: Any person who, by any means of communication, makes an apology for, promotes, or encourages homosexuality, bisexuality, or any other practice against nature, shall be punished by imprisonment of 5 to 10 years and a fine of 5,000,000 to 10,000,000 CFA francs.

Original text (French):

Article 224: Quiconque, par un moyen de communication quelconque, fait l'apologie, assure la promotion ou encourage l'homosexualité, la bisexualité ou toute autre pratique contre nature, est puni d'un emprisonnement de cinq à dix ans et d'une amende de 5 000 000 à 10 000 000 de francs CFA.

=== Senegal ===
English translation:

Article 319, Paragraph 3: Any person who, by any means whatsoever, promotes, supports, funds, or publicly justifies homosexuality, bisexuality, transsexuality, or any similar practice, shall be punished by imprisonment of three to seven years and a fine of 5,000,000 to 10,000,000 CFA francs.

Original text (French):

Article 319, alinéa 3 : Quiconque, par un moyen quelconque, assure la promotion, le soutien, le financement ou justifie publiquement l'homosexualité, la bisexualité, la transsexualité ou toute pratique similaire, est puni d'un emprisonnement de trois à sept ans et d'une amende de 5 000 000 à 10 000 000 de francs CFA.

== Repealed laws ==
=== Australia (sub-national) ===
In December 1989 in the state of Western Australia, the Parliament of Western Australia passed the Law Reform (Decriminalisation of Sodomy) Act 1989 which decriminalised private gay sex while making it a crime for a person to "...promote or encourage homosexual behaviour as part of the teaching in any primary or secondary educational institutions..." or make public policy with respect to the undefined promotion of homosexual behaviour. It was repealed in 2002 via the Acts Amendment (Gay and Lesbian Law Reform) Act 2002, which also repealed the laws with respect to promotion of homosexual behaviour in public policy and in educational institutions.

=== Brazil (sub-national) ===
Since 2023, the Brazilian Supreme Federal Court (STF) has revoked several laws and law proposals against the use of gender-neutral language in schools, either municipally or state-wide. The Justices analyzed an Allegation of Non-Compliance with a Fundamental Precept filed by the National LGBTI Alliance and the Brazilian Association of Homotransaffective Families during a virtual plenary session. The organizations argue that the legislation violates the fundamental rights to freedom of speech, as well as the freedom to learn and professorship, and the ban entails censorship of teachers, affecting the dignity of non-binary people — those who do not identify exclusively as male or female — by prohibiting them from using the language in which they feel most comfortable. The institutions recall Supreme Court decisions that recognized the rights of the LGBTI+ population.

On 5 May 2016, the state of Alagoas enacted a law establishing the Escola Livre program (lit. 'Free School'), which prohibits "ideological and political indoctrination" in the state's schools. On 21 March 2017, Supreme Court Justice Luís Roberto Barroso suspended the law through a preliminary injunction.

On October 2017, councilman Dr. Brito (PEN) proposed two draft bills to institute the Escola sem Partido program in schools in Foz do Iguaçu. Amid the approval of one of these bills, teachers and LGBTQ rights activists protested against it. On 5 July 2018, Justice Dias Toffoli issued an injunction suspending the law, after a lawsuit filed by the Communist Party of Brazil (PCdoB). On 8 May 2020, the Supreme Federal Court voted unanimously to overturn the city law.

On 13 September 2018, the Londrina City Council approved a law prohibiting the teaching of gender issues in schools. On 13 December 2019, Justice Luís Roberto Barroso issued an injunction overturning the municipal law.

On 17 October 2024, the Legislative Assembly of Amazonas enacted a law prohibiting "the reproduction of digital media that uses children linked to homosexuality." The law was proposed by the state deputy Carlinhos Bessa (PV-AM) and approved with 21 votes in favor, none against, and 3 abstentions.

On 13 December 2025, the law was amended through bill 816/2024, also proposed by Carlinhos Bessa, removing the term "homosexuality". Since then, current law prohibits "the reproduction of sexual content linked to children in cultural and artistic media."

=== Cuba ===
Following the 1959 Cuban Revolution, the government implemented policies that censored and suppressed LGBTQ expression, particularly during the 1960s and 1970s. In 1965, the regime established Military Units to Aid Production (UMAPs), where individuals deemed "anti-social," including homosexuals, were subjected to forced labor aimed at "rehabilitation." These camps operated until 1968 and were part of broader efforts to enforce heteronormative standards.

During the "Grey Years" (1971–1976), a period marked by cultural repression, the Cuban government intensified its censorship of LGBTQ content. Artists and intellectuals suspected of homosexuality faced blacklisting, and works featuring LGBTQ themes were banned or heavily censored. This era significantly curtailed the visibility and rights of LGBTQ individuals in Cuban society.

Legal reforms began to emerge in the late 20th century. In 1979, Cuba decriminalized consensual same-sex sexual activity between adults. However, public displays of homosexuality remained punishable under laws against "public scandal" until 1997, when such provisions were removed, signaling a shift toward greater acceptance.

=== Lithuania ===
On 16 June 2009, the Seimas (Lithuanian Parliament) approved an amendment to the Law on the Protection of Minors against the Detrimental Effects of Public Information (Lithuanian: Nepilnamečių apsaugos nuo neigiamo viešosios informacijos poveikio įstatymas), which would have effectively banned the "promotion of homosexual relations". The amendment was scheduled to go into effect on 1 March 2010. It was vetoed by the President citing "lack of definitions", but the veto was overturned by the Parliament. The wording of the law forbade the "propaganda of homosexual, bisexual or polygamous relations". According to some politicians who voted in favor, the possibility of defining "propaganda" should be left to lawyers.

On 17 September 2009, the European Parliament passed a resolution condemning the law and requesting the EU Fundamental Rights Agency issue a legal opinion on it. On 10 November 2009, the Seimas responded by adopting a resolution requesting the Government to seek the invalidation of the European Parliament resolution, which it condemned as an unlawful act. The EU Fundamental Rights Agency wrote to the European Parliament that it was not going to submit the requested legal opinion, given that it had no mandate to evaluate the legislation of member states.

Newly elected President Dalia Grybauskaitė expressed her strong disapproval of the law and formed a commission to elaborate a draft to repeal the discriminatory provisions. On 22 December 2009, the clauses banning the promotion among minors of "homosexual, bisexual, and polygamous relations" were eliminated, but as a compromise, the paragraph was replaced by a "ban to spread information that would promote sexual relations or other conceptions of concluding a marriage or creating a family other than established in the Constitution or the Civil Code". It has been argued that this provision is the first step towards instituting a ban on criticizing the Government and its decisions and is thus a menace to democracy in the country. Proponents of the law claimed to be led by a desire to protect traditional family and children. Some of them have expressed an opinion that the law would ban any information in public about homosexuality, regardless of its accessibility to minors or ban any public discussions and LGBT-related events. (So we propose to establish a limit that the promotion in public places is not possible to protect the mentioned three articles of the Constitution, but without doubt in some interior premises those people have the right to organize events, to promote, to discuss) The new version was signed by the President, satisfied that "the homophobic provisions [had] been repealed".

Significantly, the same law forbade mocking and bullying on the grounds of sexual orientation. It also possessed a number of other amendments, such as prohibiting the promotion of unhealthy nutrition to minors, information that "profanes family values", and the depiction of hypnosis.

The amendment was sometimes compared to Section 28, the act which prohibited discussion of homosexuality in British schools.

During its existence, there were several attempts to apply the anti-LGBTQ provisions of the law. It was unsuccessfully cited to ban the Gay Pride parade in 2010, and in 2013, and successfully referenced to declare one advertisement related to the Vilnius Gay Pride 2013 as appropriate to be broadcast at night time only and with the adult content logo. The reason given by the Board of Experts of Journalism Ethics Inspector Service was that one person in the advertisement had a T-shirt with an inscription in Lithuanian "For the diversity of families". In their opinion, it encouraged a different conception of family and marriage than established in Lithuanian laws.

In 2014, based on similar grounds, the same institution recommended restricting the distribution of a children's book of tales titled "Gintarinė širdis" ("Amber Heart") published by the Lithuanian University of Educational Sciences, because two stories in it were related to same-sex relationships. The Board ordered the book to be labelled "Not suitable for children under 14 years" and referring to this recommendation, the Ministry of Culture banned the book altogether. The case have been escalated to the European Court of Human Rights in November 2019, and was heard by the Grand Chamber on 23 March 2022. In January 2023, the Court ruled that the government's actions were in violation of article 10, the right to freedom of expression, of the treaty.

In 2014, a video clip of a gay rights organisation promoting tolerance towards LGBT people was refused to air by all major Lithuanian TV stations despite not having any overt sexuality-related content, fearing a potential breach of the Law on the Protection of Minors. The breach was later unanimously confirmed by the Board of Experts of Journalism Ethics Inspector Service.

On 18 December 2024, the Constitutional Court of Lithuania declared the anti-LGBT provisions of the Law of the Protection of Minors a violation of Article 25 of the Constitution of Lithuania, which guarantees freedom of speech, and Article 38 of the Constitution, which defines family as "the foundation of society and the state" and that the state protects and cares for the family, motherhood, fatherhood, and childhood. According to the Constitutional Court, the Seimas did not clearly define in the disputed provisions of the law what information disparages family values and promotes a different concept of marriage and family formation than that enshrined in the Constitution and the Civil Code, and therefore must be classified as information that has a negative impact on minors, and thus "created the premises for narrowing the content of the family as a constitutional institution".

=== Romania ===
"Article 200" (Articolul 200 in Romanian) was a section of the Penal Code of Romania that criminalised homosexual relationships. It was introduced in 1968 under the communist regime of Nicolae Ceauşescu. Under pressure from the Council of Europe, it was amended on 14 November 1996, when homosexual sex in private between two consenting adults was decriminalised. However, the amended Article 200 continued to criminalise same-sex relationships if they were displayed publicly or caused a "public scandal". It also continued to ban the promotion of homosexual activities, as well as the formation of gay-centred organisations (including LGBT rights organisations). It was repealed by the Năstase government on 22 June 2001.

In June 2023, the Romanian Senate approved the draft law prohibiting spreading a theory that gender is different from biological sex and that there are more than two genders, but the President of Romania appealed to the Constitutional Court to review the draft law.

=== South Korea ===
In 2001, South Korea's Ministry of Information and Communication's Information and Communications Ethics Committee began censoring online LGBT content, but it stopped the practice in 2003.

=== United Kingdom ===
"Section 28" or "Clause 28" (Note: While going through the UK Parliament, the amendment was constantly relabelled with a variety of clause numbers as other amendments were added to or deleted from the Bill, but by the final version of the Bill, which received Royal Assent, it had become Section 28. Section 28 is sometimes referred to as Clause 28 – in the United Kingdom, Acts of Parliament have sections, whereas in a Bill (which is put before Parliament to pass) those sections are called clauses."When gay became a four-letter word". BBC. 20 January 2000. Archived from the original on 28 May 2009.) of the Local Government Act 1988 caused the addition of "Section 2A" to the Local Government Act 1986, which affected England, Wales and Scotland. The amendment was enacted on 24 May 1988, and stated that a local authority "shall not intentionally promote homosexuality or publish material with the intention of promoting homosexuality" or "promote the teaching in any maintained school of the acceptability of homosexuality as a pretended family relationship".

The law's existence caused many groups to close or limit their activities or self-censor. For example, a number of lesbian, gay and bisexual student support groups in schools and colleges across Britain were closed owing to fears by council legal staff that they could breach the act.

It was repealed on 21 June 2000 in Scotland by the Ethical Standards in Public Life etc. (Scotland) Act 2000, one of the first pieces of legislation enacted by the new Scottish Parliament, and on 18 November 2003 in the rest of the United Kingdom by section 122 of the Local Government Act 2003.

=== United States ===
States that have repealed their anti-LGBT curriculum laws include Alabama (since 29 April 2021), Arizona (since 1 July 2019), North Carolina (since 2006), South Carolina (since 12 March 2020) and Utah (since 1 July 2017).

== Rejected proposals ==
=== Armenia ===
In August 2013, Armenian police briefly introduced a bill which would have banned "public promotion of non-traditional sexual relationships". According to Armenian police, "preserving the traditional Armenian family represents the pillar of national survival". The bill was removed from consideration after several days.

=== Brazil (sub-national) ===
On 13 November 2024, in Acre, the Rio Branco City Council approved Bill No. 14/2024, which aimed to prohibit the participation of children and adolescents in LGBTQ pride parades in the city. The bill was proposed by councilman João Marcos Luz, of the Liberal Party, and was approved with 10 votes in favor and 1 vote against. The bill was criticized by the Federal Public Prosecutor's Office, which accused it of perpetuating stereotypes about homosexual people.

The bill was vetoed by the then mayor of Rio Branco, Tião Bocalom, claiming that the bill was unconstitutional.

=== Moldova (national) ===
On 23 May 2013, the Parliament of Moldova passed a bill which bans the propaganda of prostitution, paedophilia and "any other relations than those related to marriage and family in accordance with the Constitution and the Family Code". The bill also includes fines. The bill was signed into law on 5 July 2013 and came into effect on 12 July 2013. The law did not explicitly prohibit the "propaganda" of homosexuality, but it could have been interpreted as such by judges. On 11 October 2013, the Parliament passed a bill intended to remove the content which could have been interpreted as a ban on "homosexual propaganda".

In April 2016, lawmakers introduced a similar bill, which was approved in committee in May 2016. The bill would amend the Law on the Rights of the Child and the Code of Administrative Offenses and ban spreading "homosexual propaganda" to minors "through public meetings, the media, the Internet," and other means. The second draft law of 24 March 2017 envisaged amending the Law on Protection of Children from the Negative Impact of Information with a view to censor public dissemination of information about non-heterosexual relations/persons. The parliament refused to adopt the amendments in both cases.

=== Ukraine ===
A draft law that would make it illegal to talk about homosexuality in public and in the media and to import, distribute, and broadcast video, photo, and audio products that "encourages homosexuality" (with penalties of up to five years in prison and fines for up to ₴5,000 (US$616)) was passed in first reading in the Verkhovna Rada (Ukrainian Parliament) on 2 October 2012. An estimated 20 community activists representing several organizations protested outside of the Verkhovna Rada building during the vote. On 4 October 2012, a second vote was tentatively scheduled for 16 October. In January 2015, the bill was removed from the agenda.

A petition was subsequently started by anti-gay groups, calling for "measures to be taken to stop the propaganda of homosexuality and for defending family values". In March 2018, Ukraine's Anti-Discrimination Ombudsperson removed the petition from the electronic petitions section. By then, the petition had received 23,000 signatures and support from various religious organisations. The Ombudsman described the petition as "anti-freedom", and deleted it due to "containing calls to restrict human rights".

=== Haiti ===
In August 2017, a bill to jail same-sex couples who get married for three years, with a fine of $8,000, passed the Haitian Senate, but never became law. In 2017, the Senate voted to ban "any public demonstration of support for homosexuality and proselytizing in favour of such acts". The fate of this bill remains unknown.

== See also ==
- Authoritarianism
- Censorship by country
- Censorship
- Discrimination against LGBTQ people
- Freedom in the World
- Freedom of speech by country
- Freedom of speech
- Freedom of the press
- Internet censorship and surveillance by country
- LGBTQ media
- LGBTQ rights by country or territory
- LGBTQ social movements
- List of freedom indices
- Oppression
- Sexual repression
- World Press Freedom Index
