= Homophobic propaganda =

Propaganda based on homophobia

Homophobic propaganda (or anti-gay propaganda) is propaganda based on homonegativity and homophobia towards homosexual and sometimes other non-heterosexual people. Such propaganda supports anti-gay prejudices and stereotypes, and promotes social stigmatization or discrimination. The term homophobic propaganda was used by the historian Stefan Micheler in his work Homophobic Propaganda and the Denunciation of Same-Sex-Desiring Men under National Socialism, as well as other works treating the topic.

In some countries, some forms of homophobic propaganda are considered hate speech and are prohibited by law. Other countries are openly homophobic and treat engaging in homosexual relations as a criminal offence.

== History ==
=== Nazi Germany ===
Political attitudes towards homosexuals in Nazi Germany were based on the assumption that homosexuals were destroying the German nation as "sexual degenerates". Historian Erwin J. Haeberle dates the first appearance of this political attitude to 14 May 1928.

Categorized as a ‘biocracy’ by Maastricht University professor Harry Oosterheis, the Nazi regime was primarily concerned with the fact that homosexual men could not bear offspring—and therefore could not ultimately contribute to the spread of the Aryan race. Though homosexuals in Nazi Germany were not persecuted systematically, researchers estimate that around 50,000 homosexual men were convicted for "unnatural vice", and between 10 and 30% of this proportion were ultimately sent to concentration camps.

== Law ==
=== Russia ===
In Russia, it is illegal to commit crimes against someone based on their social group, and LGBT people are considered a separate social group by law. Responsibility for it is established item 136 and item 282 of the criminal code of the Russian Federation.

However, on 30 June 2013, President Vladimir Putin signed into law a bill banning the "propaganda of nontraditional sexual relations" among minors, and prohibits the equation of same-sex and straight marital relationships. Vice News claims that many LGBT rights groups have been transformed "from being a stigmatized fringe group to full-blown enemies of the state" in Russia following the introduction of this law, and that openly homophobic and neo-Nazi groups such as Occupy Paedophilia have been described by Russian authorities as "civil movements fighting the sins of society".

=== Norway ===
In 1981, Norway became the first country to establish a criminal penalty (a fine or imprisonment for up to two years) for public threats, defamations, expressions of hate, or agitation for discrimination towards the LGBTQ community.

=== The Netherlands ===
On 1 July 1987, in the Netherlands joined the Dutch Penal code, which established punishment for public defamations on the basis of sexual orientation as fees or imprisonment for up to two years.

=== Ireland ===
In 1989 in Ireland a resolution against anti-gay hate speech came into effect. It establishes penalty in the form of fees or imprisonment for up to two years for publication or distribution of materials which contain defamations, threats, hate speech or offenses for LGBT people. The law is occasionally taken into effect.

=== Australia ===
On 2 March 1993, in New South Wales, Australia, an amendment to the antidiscrimination law came into effect which prohibits public hate speech, despisement or ridiculing of homosexuals. A legal exclusion is any information which is distributed for educational, religious, scientific or social purposes.

On 10 December 1999, an analogous amendment was accepted by Tasmanian parliament, which permits no exclusion.

=== South Africa ===
In February 2000 the South African Parliament enacted the Promotion of Equality and Prevention of Unfair Discrimination Act, which prohibits hate speech based on any of the constitutionally prohibited grounds, including sexual orientation. The definition of hate speech includes speech which is intended to "promote or propagate hatred".

=== United Kingdom ===
Section 28 of the Local Government Act 1988 added section 2A to the Local Government Act 1986, which forbade local authorities from being allowed to "promote homosexuality", or "promote the teaching in any maintained school the acceptability of homosexuality as a pretended family relationship".

It was repealed on 21 June 2000, in Scotland as one of the first pieces of legislation enacted by the new Scottish Parliament, and on 18 November 2003, in the rest of the United Kingdom by section 122 of the Local Government Act 2003.

=== Spain ===
Spain's antidiscrimination laws have banned hate speech in regards to sexual orientation and gender identity since 1995. Discrimination, hate, or violence on the premise of either of the aforementioned factors is punishable by up to three years in prison.

=== Poland ===
Poland's ruling party since 2015, Law and Justice, has been using anti-LGBT rhetoric increasingly through the national media, comparing liberalization of LGBT rights to the ideology of the communist regime. Stigmatizing the acronym "LGBT" as "the Western ideology" has led to demonizing politically active LGBT people, in contrast to socially conforming, "normal" LGBT people. Subsequently, "LGBT-free zones" have been introduced in some regions, with the plea of securing the idea of a traditional or Christian family model.

=== Other countries ===
Other countries which ban anti-LGBT discrimination include Andorra, Bosnia and Herzegovina, Bulgaria, Cyprus, Greece, Kosovo, Malta, Northern Cyprus, Portugal, Serbia, Belgium, France, Guernsey, Ireland, Isle of Man, Jersey, Luxembourg, Christmas Island, Cocos (Keeling) Islands, Norfolk Island, New Zealand, Fiji, New Caledonia, Micronesia, Easter Island, French Polynesia, Pitcairn Islands, United States, and Wallis and Futuna.

== See also ==
- Anti-LGBTQ rhetoric
- List of organizations designated by the Southern Poverty Law Center as anti-LGBTQ hate groups
- Sodomy law – Laws criminalising certain sexual acts
- Westboro Baptist Church – American primitive baptist church and hate group

== Bibliography ==
- Grau, Gunter (1995). The Hidden Holocaust?: Gay and Lesbian Persecution in Germany 1933–45. Routledge. ISBN 1-884964-15-X.
- Heger, Heinz (1995). The Men with the Pink Triangle: the True Life-and-Death Story of Homosexuals in the Nazi Death Camps. Alyson. ISBN 0-932870-06-6.
- Healy, Dan (2001). How many victims of the antisodomy law. Homosexual Desire in Revolutionary Russia. The University of Chicago Press. ISBN 0-226-32234-3.
- Plant, Richard (1986). The Pink Triangle: The Nazi War Against Homosexuals. New York: Holt. ISBN 0-8050-0600-1.
