= Local Government Act =

Stock short title used for legislation

Local Government Act (with its variations) is a stock short title used for legislation in Australia, Malaysia, New Zealand, Ireland and the United Kingdom, relating to local government.

The Bill for an Act with this short title may have been known as a Local Government Bill during its passage through Parliament.

Local Government Acts may be a generic name either for legislation bearing that short title or for all legislation which relates to local government.

== List ==
=== Australia ===
==== New South Wales ====
- Local Government Act 1906
- Local Government Act 1919
- Local Government Act 1993

Local government in NSW was first established by the Local Government (Shires) Act 1905 which enabled the state governor to divide the state into shires and ridings. This was consolidated by the 1906 Act, and further consolidated by the 1919 one, which also brought the City of Sydney under its umbrella, that had theretofore been controlled by the Sydney City Incorporation Act 1842. The 1993 Act repealed the earlier ones and replaced them.

==== Queensland ====
- Local Government Act 1993 (Queensland)
- Local Government Act 2009 (Queensland)

==== South Australia ====
- Local Government Act 1934
- Local Government (Forestry Reserves) Act 1944
- Local Government Finance Authority Act 1983
- Local Government Act 1999 (South Australia)
- Local Government (Elections) Act 1999
- Local Government (Implementation) Act 1999

==== Tasmania ====
- Local Government Act 1993 (Tasmania)

==== Victoria ====
- Local Government Act 1874 No. 506. The first so-called.
- Local Government Act 1890 No. 1112.
- Local Government Act 1903 No. 1893.
- Local Government Act 1915 No. 2686.
- Local Government Act 1928 No. 3720
- Local Government Act 1946 No. 5203.
- Local Government Act 1958 No. 6299.
- Local Government Act 1989 No. 11 of 1989. The current legislation

Many other acts entitled "Local Government Act" have been passed—as well as even more of the form Local Government (Specific Matter) Act—but these are the major ones which define the terms in which the others operate or alter. All but the last have had the long titles "An act to consolidate the Law(s) relating to Local Government". Additional acts concerning local government in the early days of the colony did not have short titles.

==== Western Australia ====
- Local Government Act 1995

=== Canada ===
==== British Columbia ====
- Local Government Act

=== Malaysia ===
- The Local Government Act 1976

=== New Zealand ===
- The Local Government Act 1974
- The Local Government Act 2002
- The Local Government (Rating) Act 2002
- The Local Government Official Information and Meetings Act 1987
- The Local Government (Auckland Council) Act 2009
- The Local Government (Auckland Transitional Provisions) Act 2010
- The Local Government Borrowing Act 2011
- The Local Government (Water Services Preliminary Arrangements) Act 2024

=== Ireland ===
- The Local Government Act 1925
- The Local Government Act 1927
- The Local Government Act 1931
- The Local Government Act 1933
- The Local Government Act 1936
- The Local Government Act 1941
- The Local Government Act 1955
- The Local Government (Reorganisation) Act 1985
- The Local Government Act 1991
- The Local Government Act 1994
- The Local Government Act 1998
- The Local Government Act 2000
- The Local Government Act 2001
- The Local Government Reform Act 2014
- The Local Government Act 2019

=== United Kingdom ===
==== Acts of the Parliament of the United Kingdom ====
The following list of acts passed by the Parliament of the United Kingdom only includes public general acts, and so does not include any of the numerous "provisional order confirmation acts"

| Act | Summary |
|---|---|
| Local Government (Drogheda and Meath) Act 1845; Note that this short title is only used in Ireland | |
| Local Government Act 1858 | Replaced Public Health Act 1848 |
| Local Government Act (1858) Amendment Act 1861 | |
| Local Government Act Amendment Act 1863 | |
| Local Government (Ireland) Act 1871 | |
| Local Government (Boundaries) Act 1887 | |
| Local Government Act 1888 | Created county councils and county boroughs in England and Wales |
| Local Government (Scotland) Act 1889 | Created county councils in Scotland |
| Local Government Act 1894 | Created rural and urban districts in England and Wales |
| Local Government (Scotland) Act 1894 | Created Local Government Board and parish councils in Scotland |
| Local Government (Scotland) Act 1894 Amendment Act 1895 | |
| Local Government (Elections) Act 1896 | |
| Local Government (Elections) (No. 2) Act 1896 | |
| Local Government (Determination of Differences) Act 1896 | |
| Local Government (Ireland) Act 1897 | |
| Local Government (Joint Committees) Act 1897 | |
| Local Government (Ireland) Act 1898 | Created county councils, rural and urban districts in Ireland |
| Local Government (Ireland) Act 1900 | |
| Local Government (Ireland) (No. 2) Act 1900 | |
| Local Government (Ireland) Act 1901 | |
| Local Government (Ireland) Act 1902 | |
| Local Government (Transfer of Powers) Act 1903 | |
| Local Government (Ireland) Act (1898) Amendment Act 1906 | |
| Local Government (Scotland) Act 1908 | |
| Local Government (Adjustments) Act 1913 | |
| Local Government (Adjustments) (Scotland) Act 1914 | |
| Local Government (Emergency Provisions) Act 1916 | |
| Local Government Emergency Provisions (No. 2) Act 1916 | |
| Local Government (Allotments and Land Cultivation) (Ireland) Act 1917 | |
| Local Government (Ireland) Act 1919 | |
| Local Government (County Boroughs and Adjustments) Act 1926 | Amended the rules for the creation of county boroughs |
| Local Government Act 1929 | Provision for county review orders to amend districts; poor law boards abolished in England and Wales |
| Local Government (Scotland) Act 1929 | Created large and small burghs and district councils; poor law reformed in Scotland |
| Local Government (Clerks) Act 1931 | |
| Local Government (General Exchequer Contributions) Act 1933 | |
| Local Government Act 1933 | Consolidated earlier legislation in England and Wales |
| Local Government (Members' Travelling Expenses) Act 1937 | |
| Local Government (Hours of Poll) Act 1938 | |
| Local Government Amendment (Scotland) Act 1939 | |
| Local Government (Boundary Commission) Act 1945 | |
| Local Government (Scotland) Act 1947 | |
| Local Government Act 1948 | |
| Local Government Boundary Commission (Dissolution) Act 1949 | |
| Local Government (Scotland) Act 1951 | |
| Local Government (Miscellaneous Provisions) Act 1953 | |
| Local Government (Street Works) (Scotland) Act 1956 | |
| Local Government Elections Act 1956 | |
| Local Government (Omnibus Shelters and Queue Barriers) (Scotland) Act 1958 | |
| Local Government Act 1958 | Initiated reviews of large urbanised areas, made provision for rural boroughs |
| Local Government (Records) Act 1962 | |
| Local Government (Development and Finance) (Scotland) Act 1964 | |
| Local Government (Pecuniary Interests) Act 1964 | |
| Local Government (Scotland) Act 1947 (Amendment) Act 1965 | |
| Local Government (Pecuniary Interests) (Scotland) Act 1966 | |
| Local Government Act 1966 | |
| Local Government (Scotland) Act 1966 | |
| Local Government (Termination of Reviews) Act 1967 | Ended reviews started by the 1958 Act |
| Local Government (Footpaths and Open Spaces) (Scotland) Act 1970 | |
| Local Government Act 1972 | Created metropolitan and non-metropolitan counties in England and Wales |
| Local Government (Scotland) Act 1973 | |
| Local Government Act 1974 | |
| Local Government (Scotland) Act 1975 | |
| Local Government (Miscellaneous Provisions) Act 1976 | |
| Local Government (Scotland) Act 1978 | |
| Local Government Act 1978 | |
| Local Government, Planning and Land Act 1980 | |
| Local Government (Miscellaneous Provisions) (Scotland) Act 1981 | |
| Local Government and Planning (Amendment) Act 1981 | |
| Local Government (Miscellaneous Provisions) Act 1982 | |
| Local Government Finance Act 1982 | Local authorities going above spending limits could have general grants removed |
| Local Government and Planning (Scotland) Act 1982 | |
| Local Government (Interim Provisions) Act 1984 | |
| Local Government (Access to Information) Act 1985 | The freedom of information law for local government. It provided greater public access to meetings, reports and documents, subject to its confidentiality provisions. |
| Local Government Act 1985 | Abolished the Greater London Council and the county councils of the metropolitan counties |
| Local Government Act 1986 | |
Local Government Finance Act 1987
| Local Government Act 1987 | |
| Local Government Act 1988 | Introduced the controversial Section 28 |
| Local Government and Housing Act 1989 | introduced the principle of 'politically restricted posts' and restricting the political activities of local authority employees. |
| Local Government Finance (Publicity for Auditors' Reports) Act 1991 | |
| Local Government Act 1992 | Made provision for the creation of unitary districts in England |
| Local Government (Overseas Assistance) Act 1993 | |
| Local Government (Amendment) Act 1993 | |
| Local Government (Wales) Act 1994 | Created current unitary structure in Wales |
| Local Government etc. (Scotland) Act 1994 | Created current unitary structure in Scotland |
| Local Government (Gaelic Names) (Scotland) Act 1997 | |
| Local Government and Rating Act 1997 | |
| Local Government (Contracts) Act 1997 | |
| Local Government Act 1999 | Requirement for most authorities in England and Wales to achieve 'best value' |
| Local Government Act 2000 | Introduced directly elected local mayors and replaced the traditional committee system of decision-making with the executive model and introduced scrutiny to local government. |
| Local Government Act 2003 | |
| Local Government and Public Involvement in Health Act 2007 | |
| Local Government Act 2010 | |
| Local Government (Review of Decisions) Act 2015 | |
| Local Government (Religious etc. Observances) Act 2015 | |
| Cities and Local Government Devolution Act 2016 | |
| Local Government (Disqualification) Act 2022 | |

==== Acts of the Parliament of Northern Ireland ====
- The Local Government (Emergency Powers) Act 1921 (N.I.) (12 Geo. 5. c. 5 (N.I.))
- The Local Government Act (Northern Ireland) 1922 (12 & 13 Geo. 5. c. 16 (N.I.)
- The Local Government Act (Northern Ireland) 1969 (c. 34 (N.I.))
- The Local Government (Boundaries) Act (Northern Ireland) 1971 (c. 9 (N.I.))
- The Local Government Act (Northern Ireland) 1972 (c. 9 (N.I.))

==== Orders in Council for Northern Ireland ====
- The Local Government (Postponement of Elections and Reorganisation) (Northern Ireland) Order 1972
- The Local Government &c. (Northern Ireland) Order 1972
- The Local Government (Reduction of General Grant) (Northern Ireland) Order 1975
- The Department of Housing, Local Government and Planning (Dissolution) (Northern Ireland) Order 1976
- The Pollution Control and Local Government (Northern Ireland) Order 1978
- The Local Government, Planning and Land (Northern Ireland) Order 1981
- The Local Government (Miscellaneous Provisions) (Northern Ireland) Order 1985
- The Local Government (Temporary Provisions) (Northern Ireland) Order 1986
- The Local Government (Miscellaneous Provisions) (Northern Ireland) Order 1992
- The Local Government (Miscellaneous Provisions) (Northern Ireland) Order 1995
- The Local Government (Amendment) (Northern Ireland) Order 1998
- The Local Government (Miscellaneous Provisions) (Northern Ireland) Order 2002
- The Local Government (Northern Ireland) Order 2005
- The Local Government (Boundaries) (Northern Ireland) Order 2006

==== Acts of the Northern Ireland Assembly ====
- The Local Government (Best Value) Act (Northern Ireland) 2002 (c. 4 (N.I.))
- The Local Government (Boundaries) Act (Northern Ireland) 2008 (c. 7 (N.I.))
- The Local Government (Miscellaneous Provisions) Act (Northern Ireland) 2010 (c. 7 (N.I.))
- The Local Government Finance Act (Northern Ireland) 2011 (c. 10 (N.I.))
- The Local Government Act (Northern Ireland) 2014 (c. 8 (N.I.))
- The Local Government (Meetings and Performance) Act (Northern Ireland) 2021 (c. 8 (N.I.))

==== Acts of Senedd Cymru ====
- The Local Government (Wales) Measure 2009 (nawm 2)
- The Local Government (Wales) Measure 2011 (nawm 4)
- The Democracy and Boundary Commission Cymru etc. Act 2013 (anaw 4) was originally known as the 'Local Government (Democracy) (Wales) Act 2013'
- The Local Government (Wales) Act 2015 (anaw 6)
- The Local Government and Elections (Wales) Act 2021 (asc 1)
- The Local Government Finance (Wales) Act 2024 (asc 6)

==== Acts of the Scottish Parliament ====
- The Scottish Local Government (Elections) Act 2002 (asp 1)
- The Local Government in Scotland Act 2003 (asp 1)
- The Local Governance (Scotland) Act 2004 (asp 9)
- The Scottish Local Government (Elections) Act 2009 (asp 10)
- The Local Government Finance (Unoccupied Properties etc.) (Scotland) Act 2012 (asp 11)
- The Scottish Local Government Elections (Candidacy Rights of Foreign Nationals) Act 2022 (asp 4)

== See also ==
- List of short titles
