= John Shiers =

British gay-rights campaigner

- Born: 1952; Tadworth, Surrey, England, United Kingdom
- Died: 27 October 2011 (aged 58–59); Manchester, England, United Kingdom

John Shiers (1952–2011) was a Manchester based British left-wing gay rights campaigner. He was also a leading campaigner and a founding member of the Hulme Asbestos Action Group. He died in 2011 of mesothelioma, a type of cancer closely linked to exposure to asbestos. The legal case against his landlord, citing asbestos in his council home leading to his cause of death, was one of the first of its kind.

== Early life ==
In his earlier years, he attended Lancaster University, where he was a member of the Gay Liberation Front and travelled to London for conferences On completing his studies at York University, he was attracted to the lifestyle of the commercial gay scene at the emerging Manchester gay village at Canal Street. In 1978, he lamented on how it changed him, rather than him bringing change in accordance with the ideals he had learned from the Gay Liberation Front. He recalled bouts of depression and how for some time he met his partners through cottaging. He described his sexual encounters as 'commoditised' and not associated with emotion.

== Gay Rights Activism ==
In 1978, some of his writings were published by the gay men's socialist journal Gay Left. His article 'Two Steps Forward, One Step Back: Coming Out Six Years On', as well as an open letter titled 'Fighting Fascism', were both included in the publication's 6th issue. In the 1980s, he was involved with the Labour Campaign for Lesbian and Gay Rights, where he attended meetings. He also organised in Manchester against Section 28; a clause of the Local Government Act of 1988 which condemned the "promotion of homosexuality" in schools.

== Career ==
In his early work career as a local authority officer, he was a strong influence in decentralising council services in Manchester and Rochdale in the 1980s. His career in the early 1990s was with Save The Children, where he became a consultant and charity trustee. He was influential in shaping services for children and young people in the North West England region. By the middle of the 1990s he had changed his career to psychosynthesis. To address further bouts of depression, he studied and qualified and went on to build a psychotherapy practice in Didsbury.

== Campaigns Against Asbestos ==
In the late 1970s he had moved to local authority housing in Hulme, owned by Manchester City Council when first arriving in the city. Whilst living in Hulme he discovered he and thousands of his neighbours council properties were riddled with asbestos. He had been one of the first to speak out about the asbestos in the properties. After his death Manchester Council admitted limited liability, in what was one of the first legal cases of this type.

In 2011 he was a guest speaker at the Greater Manchester Asbestos Victims Support Group and spoke in the presence of a gathering including Members of parliament Lisa Nandy, Kate Green, Tony Lloyd and Paul Goggins alongside Dr Linda Waldman, co-author of a report on asbestos in social housing at the Action Mesothelioma Day of the need for greater access to information about asbestos in social housing, highlighting risks of no requirement for social housing landlords to inform tenants of the presence of asbestos.
