= City of North Sydney =

Proposed local government area in New South Wales

The City of North Sydney was a proposed local government area in 1962 which would have been formed from the merger of Willoughby, Lane Cove, North Sydney, and Mosman, in New South Wales, Australia. It was being widely predicted to happen by the Sydney press by 1963. At the instigation of the Local Government Association, it was proposed by 85 electors of the North Shore, who sent a petition to the Minister for Local Government Pat Hills to exercise his powers under Section 16 of the Local Government Act.

== "Greater Sydney" versus "twin cities" ==
They did so in reaction to the perceived prospect of their being incorporated into a "Greater Sydney", a Labor Party policy of the time. Local government amalgamation had been a continual topic of discussion during the early 1960s, with Leichhardt council in favour of a Greater Sydney, but the North Shore and eastern suburbs opposed; and City of Sydney council divided on the matter.

In 1924, a similar idea had been suggested to amalgamate North Sydney and Mosman into a single city under the Local Government Act, which had allowed for the possibilities of such amalgamations, requiring that they be cities and not just suburbs, when the population reached 20,000 people and the mean gross income was AU£20,000. Proponents of the idea had argued that, echoing the words of the Mayor of Mosman discussing the North Sydney Electric Supply in 1912, "the more we connect ourselves with Sydney, the more we will be encumbering ourselves with Greater Sydney. Their electric light cables will be the first loop around our legs, and the next thing will be that the lassoo of a Greater Sydney will have settled round our necks, and we will be inextricably tangled in it.". Although nothing came of the idea in 1924, the idea of such a "twin city" to Sydney survived into the 1960s, and a survey done in 1951–1952 supported the argument that the suburbs were ready for such an amalgamation, as far as population, housing standards, commerce and shopping facilities, and parkland and recreational opportunities were concerned.

Various urban developments in the 1950s were also seen as furthering the idea: Greenway, which was a housing project at Milson's Point; an office block for the Australian Mutual Provident Society; and the building used by the Mutual Life and Citizens' Assurance. The construction of the Sydney Harbour Bridge encouraged such development, and one 1964 observer considered North Sydney to be "fast becoming a twin city to the Capital, as Brooklyn is a twin city to New York". (A decade later, referring to the skyscrapers in North Sydney, Australia Now would describe North Sydney as "now a twin city to downtown Sydney", although by the end of the 1970s the insurance building boom in North Sydney, that had been seen as evidence of a de facto if not de jure "twin city" status, had moved downtown.)

== 1960s moves and countermoves ==
Prior moves towards a Greater Sydney in 1946 had led to the formation of a Northern Suburbs Local Government Protection Committee. In response, the NSW government modified its proposal to comprise only 30 (then) municipalities, and in the face of further protest reactions, to 21. A Bill to enact this was modified in the NSW Legislative Council to comprise just 9 municipalities, and excluded the North Shore suburbs. The idea of North Shore amalgamation thus continued into the 1960s. A previous Minister for Local Government, J. B. Renshaw, exhibited a plan in 1959 that avoided the "twin city" idea, to which others voiced objections. Deputy Mayor Goodman of North Sydney stated that "We believe that in North Sydney we now have sufficient population for a city of our own and that we can fill the requirements of a city. There will probably be a move to expand the city to take over North Sydney, but we will fight this tooth and nail. This expansion move seems to be behind much of the planning scheme.".

A plebiscite was held in Mosman in December 1962, and the result was 1,133 in favour of amalgamation and 11,553 opposed. Later moves to create a Greater Sydney in the 1970s would initiate another plebiscite in 1977, in which 89% were opposed.

When the Liberal Party Askin government came to power in 1965, it blocked any form of larger Sydney metropolitan authority, opposing and undoing all of the Labor Party's prior steps that it had taken towards some form of amalgamation. Instead, the City of Sydney was classified as a village, and the New South Wales government created several ad hoc authorities such as the Farm Produce Market Authority and the Zoological Park Board. Planning and control of national parks were brought under the ambit of NSW government departments, and sewereage, water supply, and public health services were also centralized. The 1960s idea of having a "Greater Sydney" that had spurred this reaction in the first place, faltered.

== See also ==
- Greater Sydney
- Local government in New South Wales
