= Greater Sydney =

Greater Sydney Region
- Region
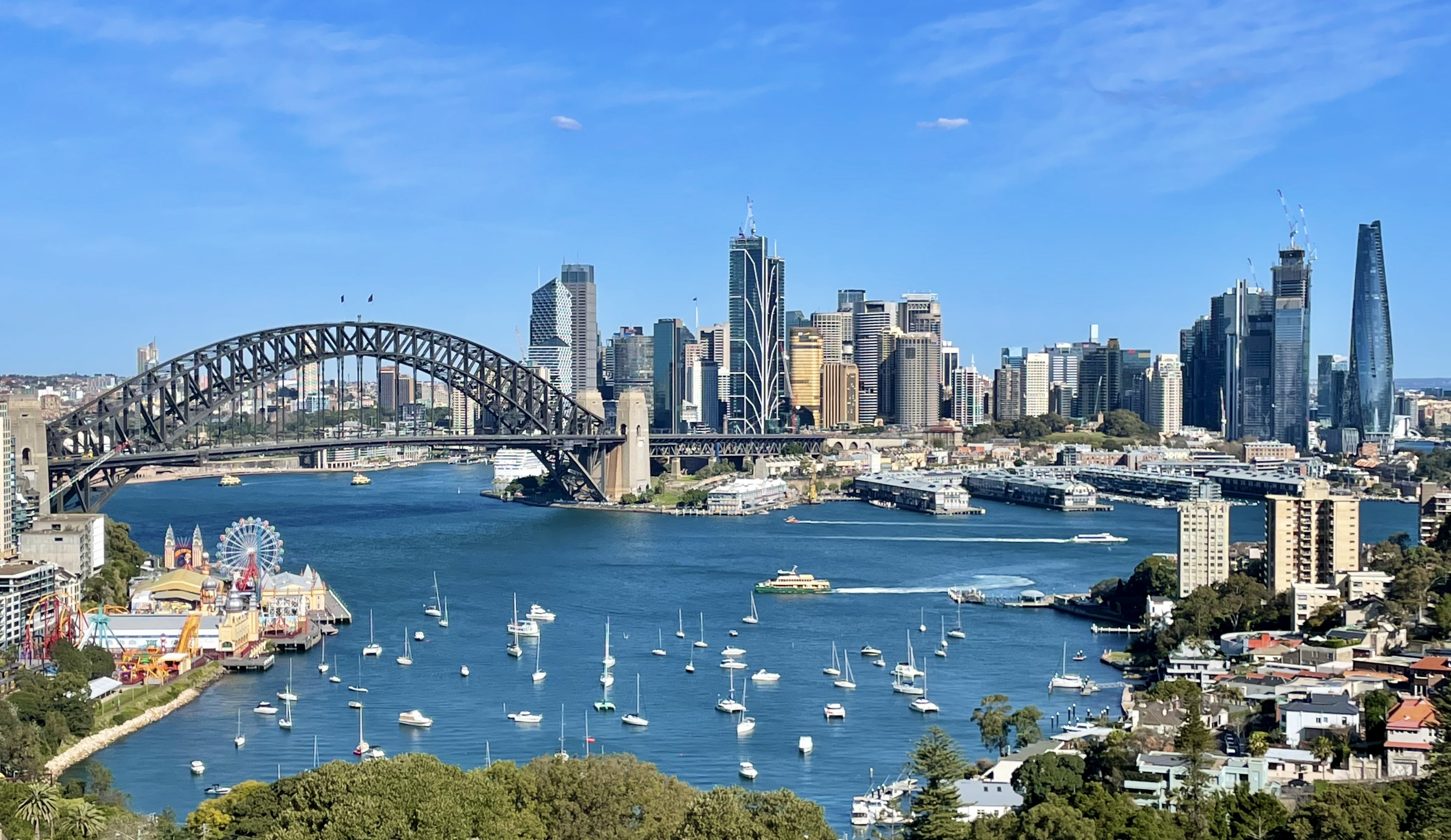
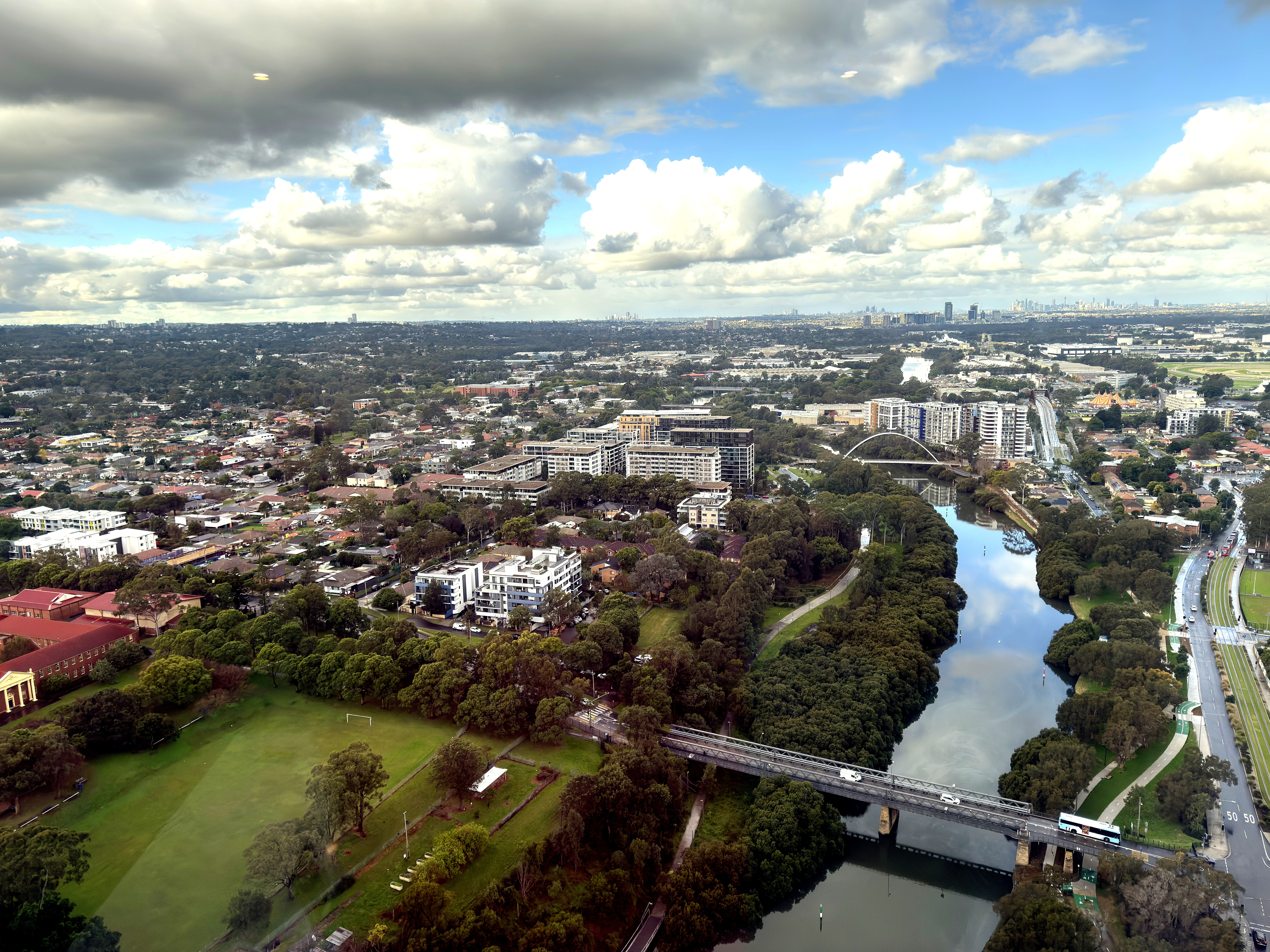
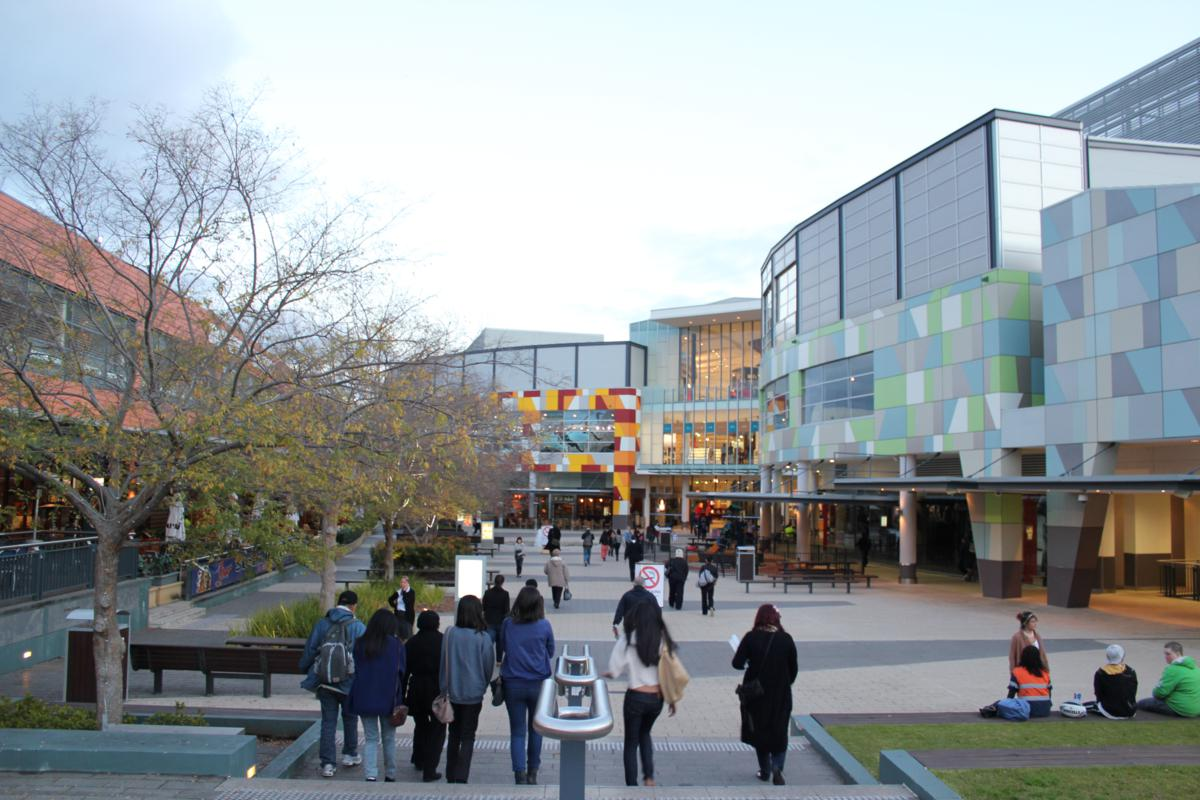
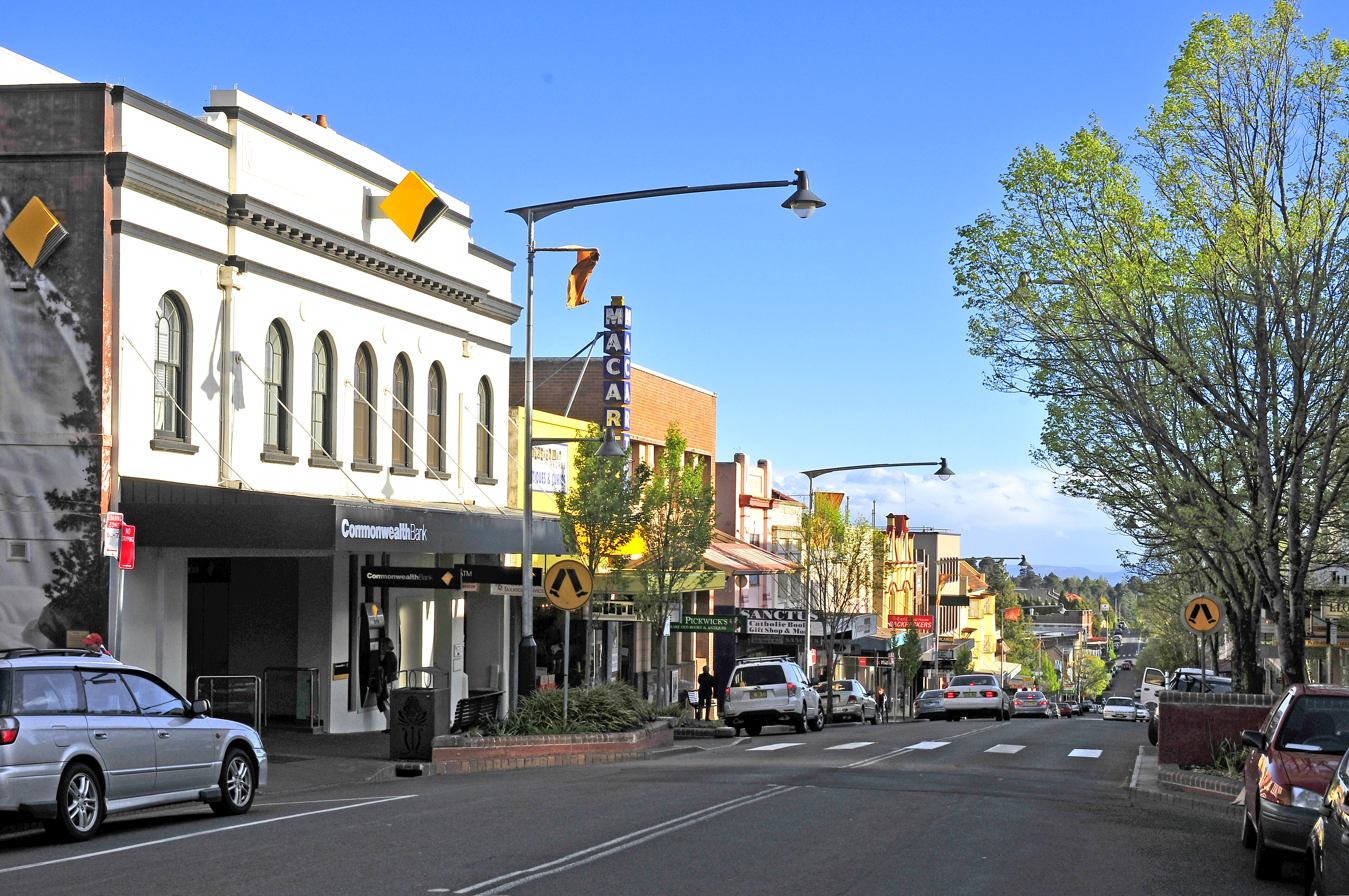
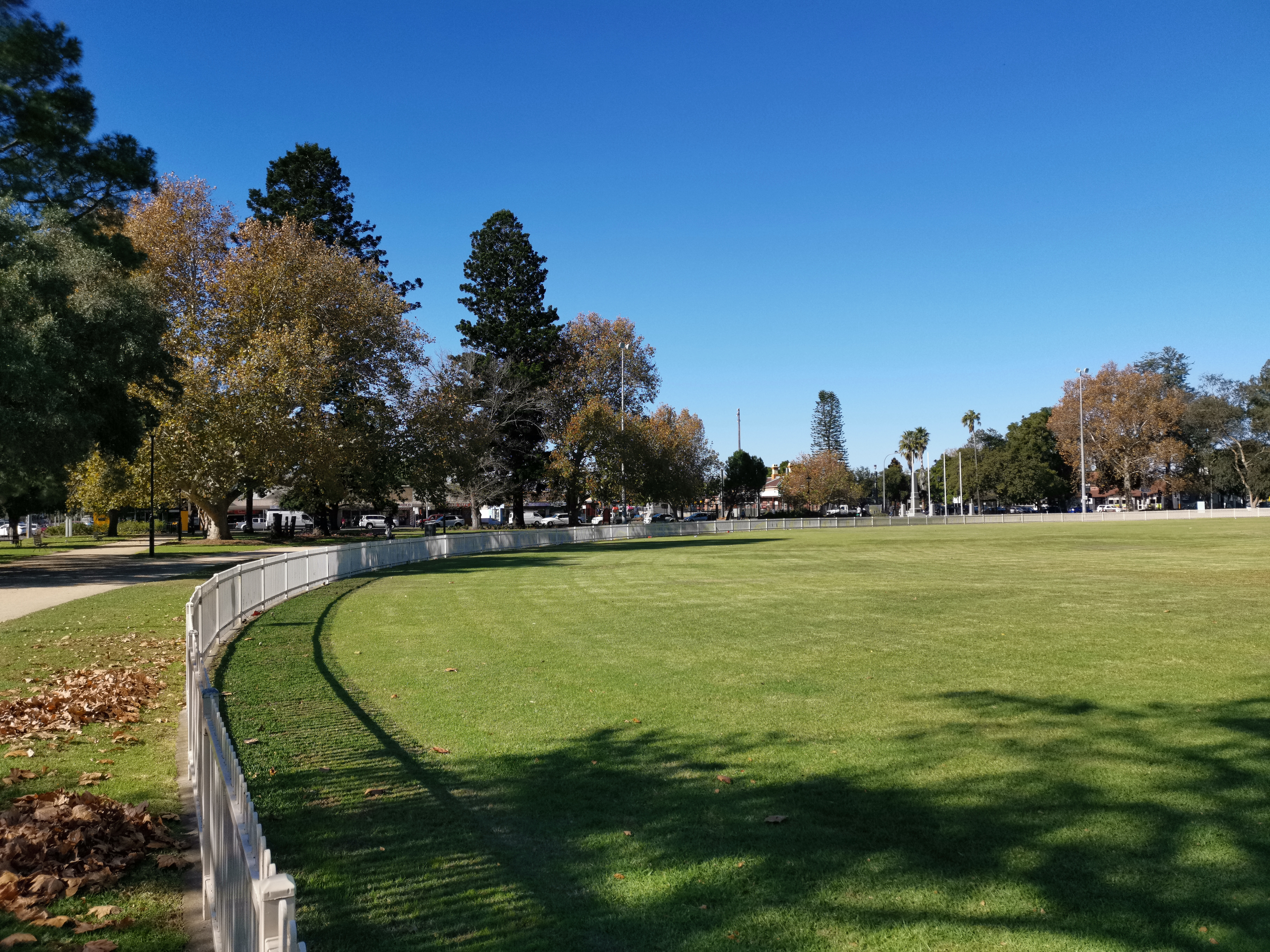
- Clockwise from top: Sydney CBD, Macarthur Square in Campbelltown, Richmond, Katoomba, Western Sydney viewed from Parramatta

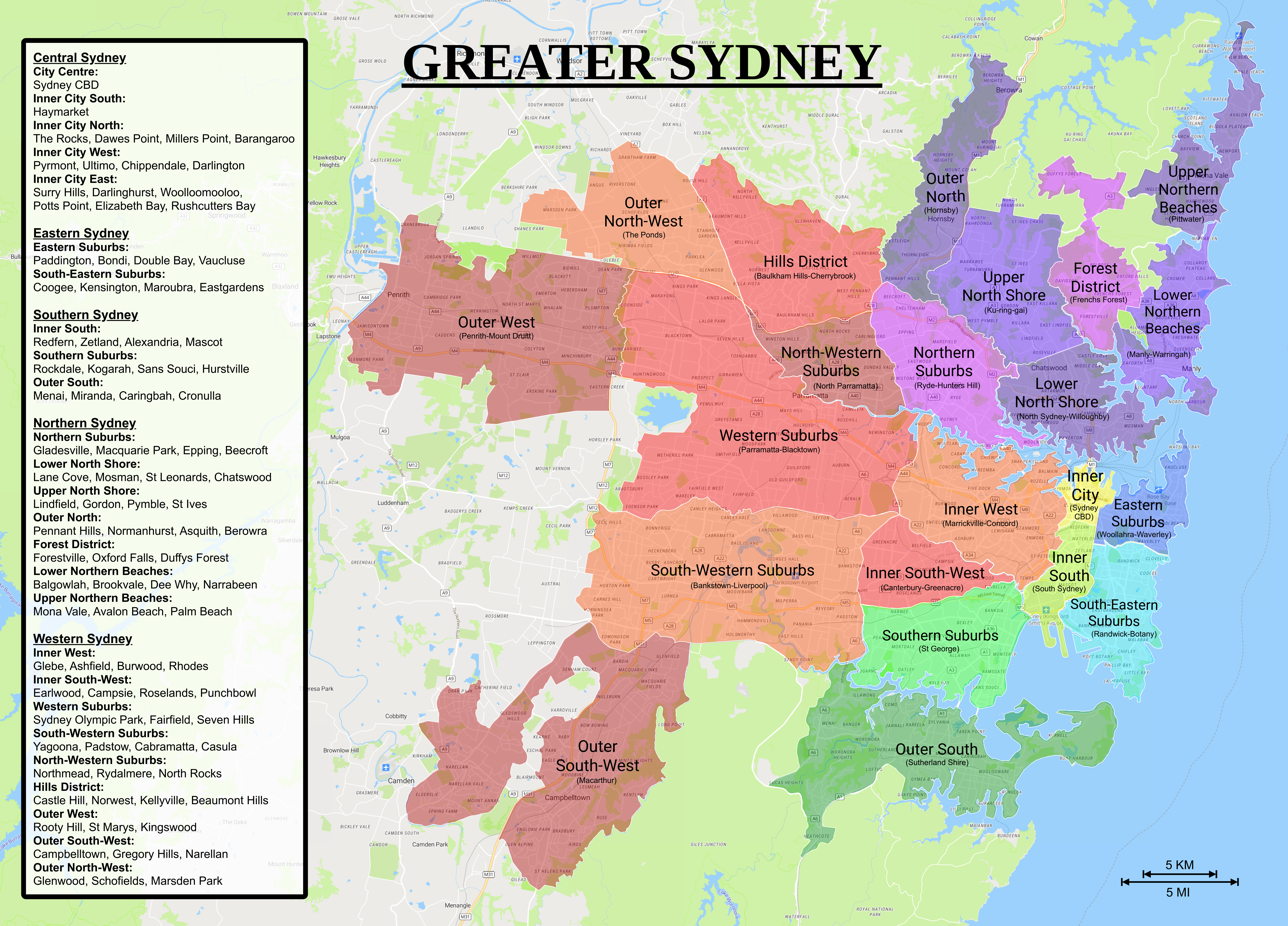

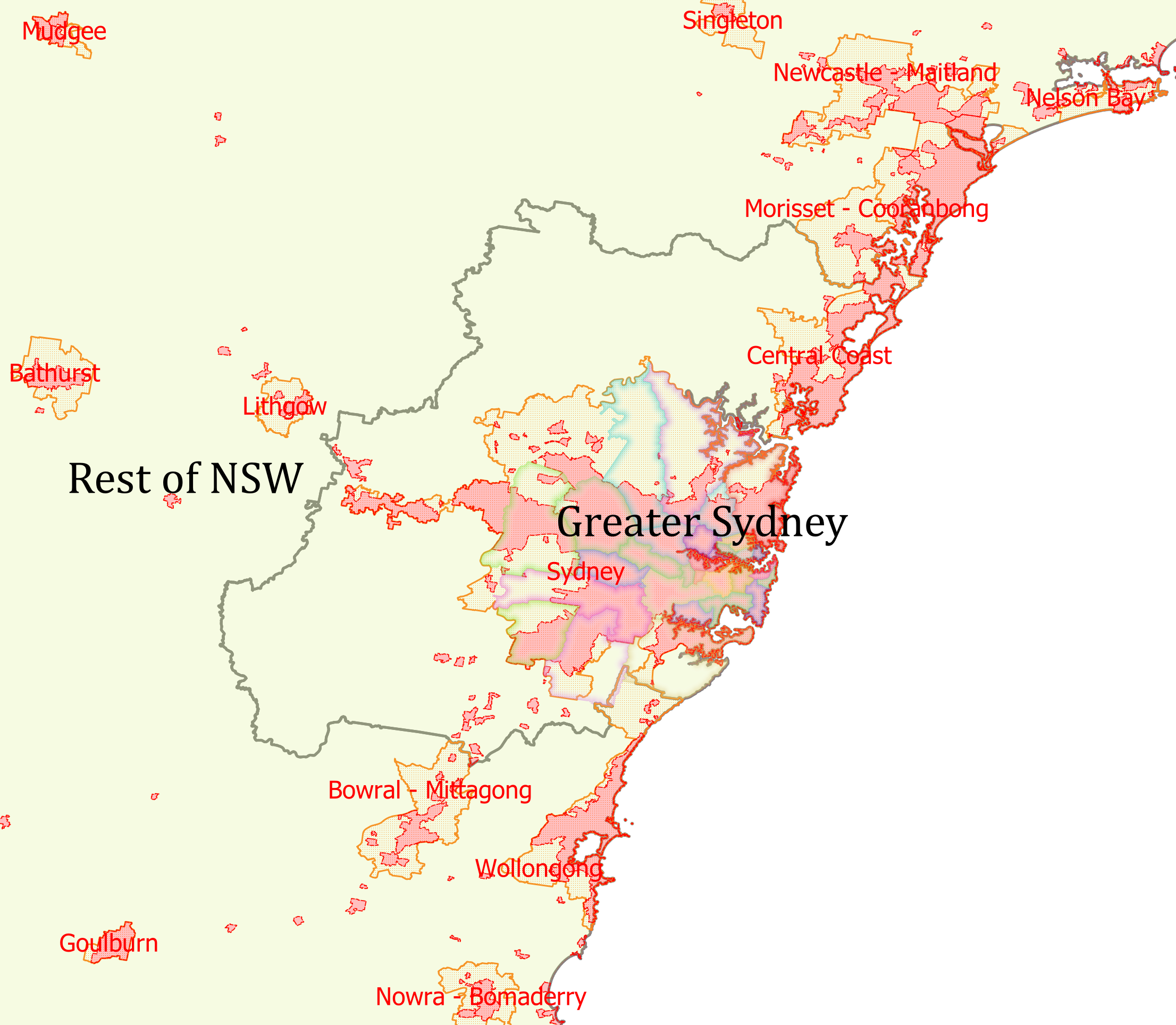
- Country: Australia
- State: New South Wales
- LGA: 33 local government areas

Government
  - State electorate: 49 electoral districts
  - Federal division: 24 divisions

Area (GCCSA)
  - Total: 12,367.7 km^{2} (4,775.2 sq mi)

GDP (nominal)
  - Total: A$490 billion (2021) (US$368.42 billion)
  - Per capita: A$88,738 (2021) (US$66,720.3)
- Time zone: UTC+10:00 (Australian Eastern Standard Time (AEST))
- County: Cumberland; Cook; Camden

Greater Sydney is the most populous metropolitan area in Australia and Oceania. Located in the state of New South Wales, it encompasses the state capital, Sydney, including the City of Sydney local government area (LGA) and the surrounding built-up areas. Greater Sydney covers an area stretching from Hawkesbury and the Northern Beaches in the north, to the Blue Mountains in the west, and to Wollondilly, Campbelltown and Sutherland in the south.

Under the New South Wales Greater Cities Commission (formerly the Greater Sydney Commission), the Greater Sydney Region, along with Newcastle, the Central Coast and Wollongong, will constitute a Sandstone Mega-region that will make up 70% of the New South Wales population and 25% of the national population.

== History ==
A Greater Sydney had been proposed several times prior to its eventual formation, usually curtailed by some form of national crisis. There had been a Labor Party Greater Sydney Bill before the NSW legislature, defeated because of the controversy over conscription during the Boer War. A Bill proposed by William McKell that had stalled in committee failed outright when the Lang government fell. Labor Party proposals of the 1940s fell by the wayside because of World War 2. An early 1960s proposal was opposed by moves to instead create a City of North Sydney, and was quashed outright by the Liberal Party government of Robert Askin in 1965.

== Definitions ==
In its broadest definition, Greater Sydney covers the city of Sydney in addition to four neighbouring regions: the Blue Mountains, the Hawkesbury, Macarthur and Wollondilly.

=== During the COVID-19 pandemic ===
During the COVID-19 pandemic, Greater Sydney was defined as the city of Sydney itself as well as the Central Coast and Wollongong (including both the City of Wollongong in the north and the City of Shellharbour in the south). On 19 August 2021, the NSW Government has informed that the Central Coast Council and the City of Shellharbour local government areas had been removed from the Greater Sydney COVID-19 Lockdown to become Regional NSW local government areas, while the City of Wollongong remained under the Greater Sydney COVID-19 regulations.

=== Greater Sydney Districts ===
The Greater Sydney Region Plan defines the five districts that form the Greater Sydney metropolitan area as follows:

Greater Sydney Districts
Western City	Central City	Eastern City	North District	South District
Blue Mountains	Blacktown	Bayside	Hornsby	Georges River
Hawkesbury	Cumberland	Burwood	Hunters Hill	Canterbury–Bankstown
Penrith	Parramatta	Canada Bay	Ku–ring–gai	Sutherland
Camden	The Hills	Inner West	Lane Cove	
Campbelltown		Randwick	Northern Beaches	
Fairfield		Strathfield	Mosman	
Liverpool		Woollahra	Willoughby	
Wollondilly		Waverley	Ryde	
		City of Sydney	North Sydney	

=== Sydney Greater Capital City Statistical Area ===
The Sydney Greater Capital City Statistical Area (GCCSA) is the definition of Greater Sydney used by the Australian Bureau of Statistics (ABS). It covers the following level-four statistical areas:

- Sydney — Baulkham Hills and Hawkesbury
- Sydney — Blacktown
- Central Coast
- Sydney — City and Inner South
- Sydney — Eastern Suburbs
- Sydney — Inner South West
- Sydney — Inner West
- Sydney — Northern Beaches
- Sydney — North Sydney and Hornsby
- Sydney — Outer South West
- Sydney — Outer West and Blue Mountains
- Sydney — Parramatta
- Sydney — Ryde
- Sydney — South West
- Sydney — Sutherland

Therefore, the Sydney GCCSA covers all of the 33 local government areas in Greater Sydney which includes the City of Blue Mountains to the west, the City of Hawkesbury and the Northern Beaches Council to the north, Botany Bay to the east and the Sutherland Shire and the Wollondilly Shire to the south. The Sydney GCCSA also includes the Central Coast, which in most cases is considered a regional area that is situated north of Greater Sydney, however the Australian Bureau of Statistics includes the Central Coast within the broader Sydney GCCSA area, which increases Greater Sydney's population by approximately 350,000 for the Sydney GCCSA definition, but is considered its own Significant Urban Area and a stand-alone region within its own right. The Illawarra, which is south of Greater Sydney is not included in the Sydney GCCSA.

== Economy ==
Greater Sydney procuded around one quarter of Australia's GDP or A$490 billion (2021) (US$368.42 billion).

== Gallery ==
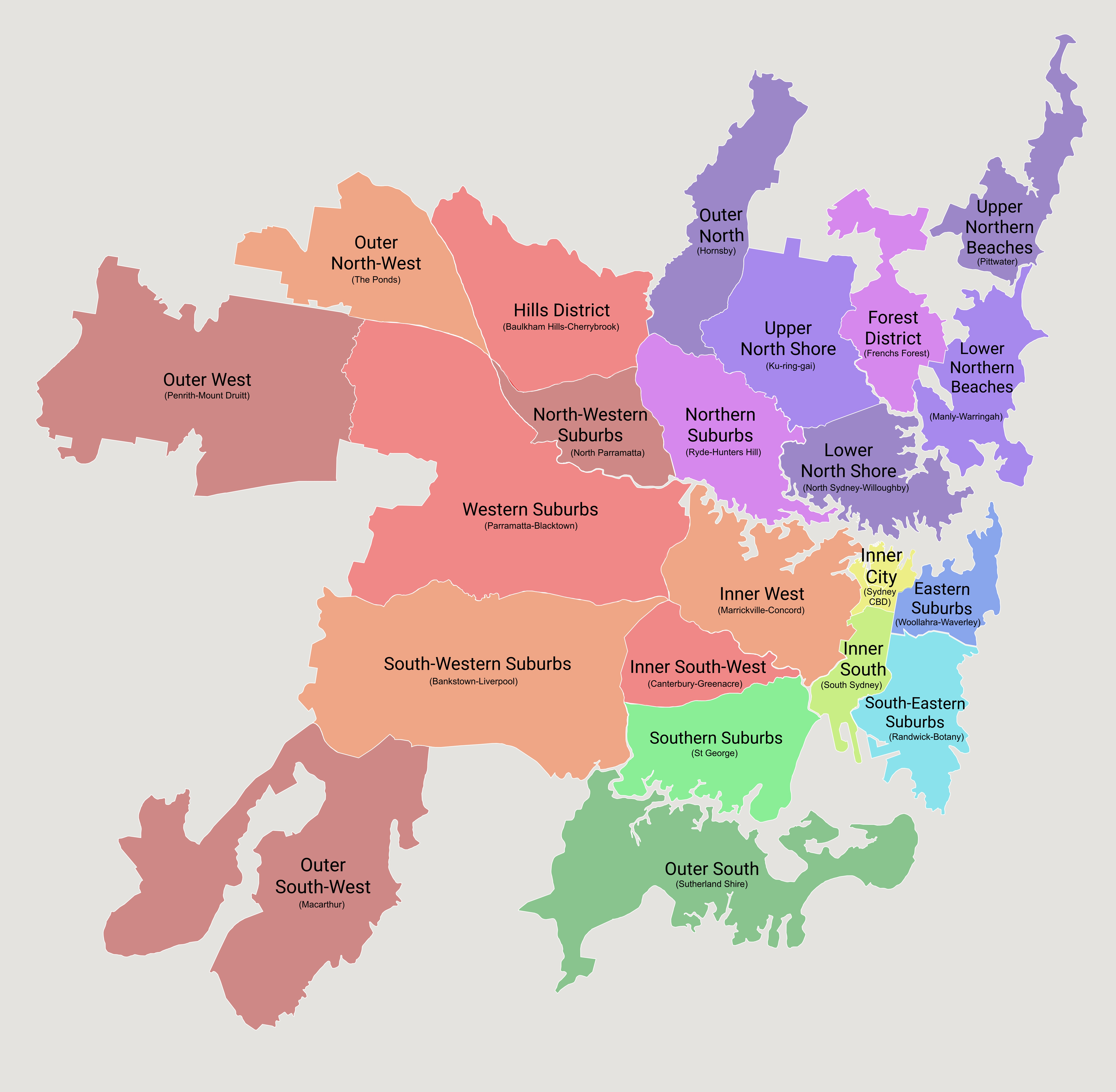
Greater Sydney Regions and Suburbs

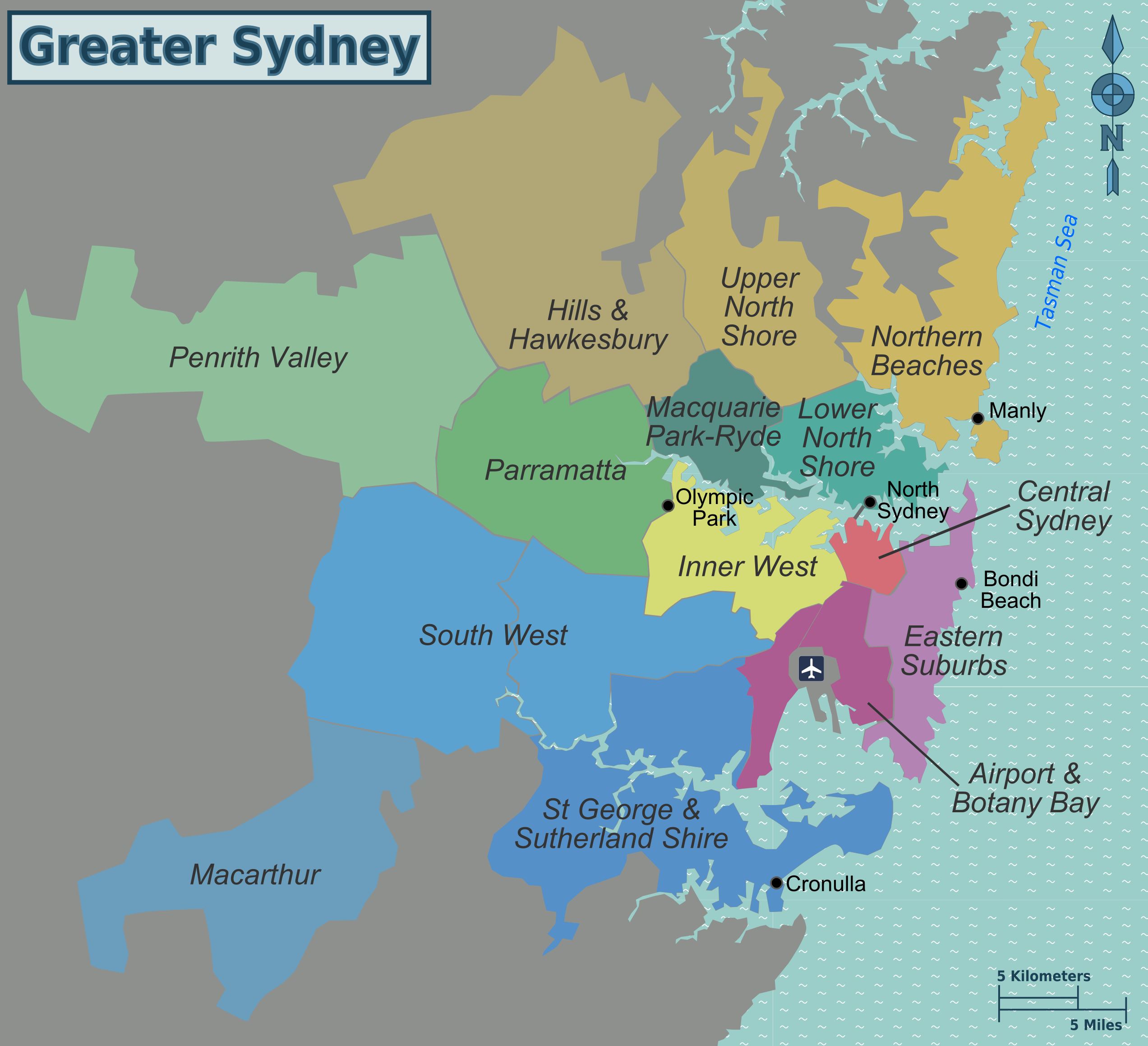
