= Ethical Standards in Public Life etc. (Scotland) Act 2000 =

Act of the Scottish Parliament

Ethical Standards in Public Life etc. (Scotland) Act 2000 (Note: Section 37(1).)
- Act of the Scottish Parliament
- Scottish Parliament
- Long title: An Act of the Scottish Parliament to establish a framework for securing the observance of high standards of conduct by councillors and other persons holding public appointments; and to repeal section 2A of the Local Government Act 1986 and make provision as to how councils are to exercise functions which relate principally to children.
- Citation: 2000 asp 7
- Introduced by: Wendy Alexander
- Territorial extent: Scotland

Dates
- Royal assent: 24 July 2000
- Commencement: various (Note: Section 37(2)–(3))
Other legislation
Amends	Local Government (Scotland) Act 1973; Local Government Act 1986
Amended by	Scottish Public Services Ombudsman Act 2002; Smoking, Health and Social Care (Scotland) Act 2005; Water Services etc. (Scotland) Act 2005; Scottish Parliamentary Commissions and Commissioners etc. Act 2010; National Library of Scotland Act 2012; Scottish Crown Estate Act 2019
Relates to	Local Government Act 1988

Status: Amended

History of passage through the Parliament

Text of statute as originally enacted

Text of the Ethical Standards in Public Life etc. (Scotland) Act 2000 as in force today (including any amendments) within the United Kingdom, from legislation.gov.uk.

The Ethical Standards in Public Life etc. (Scotland) Act 2000 (asp 7) is an act of the Scottish Parliament which established that the Scottish Ministers had to issue a code of conduct for councillors, and put in place mechanisms for dealing with councillors in contravention of the code. It was introduced by Scottish Executive minister Wendy Alexander.

It passed on 21 June 2000 with 99 votes for and 17 against, with 2 abstentions, and received Royal Assent on 4 July 2000. The Local Government Act 2003 repealed Section 28 in England and Wales three years later.

== Provisions ==
=== Section 2A of the Local Government Act 1986 ===
The act was most notable for its repeal of section 2A of the Local Government Act 1986 (equivalent to Section 28 of the Local Government Act 1988) in Scotland. This had prevented local authorities from "the teaching of the acceptability of homosexuality as a pretended family relationship."

The bill did require that councils would, in their dealings with children, have to regard the value of a stable family relationship, and that any education about family life would be appropriate to the child's age and development.

=== Ethical Standards in Public Life framework ===
A framework and Code of Conduct was established which applied to local authority councillors and members of Scottish public bodies. The act applies to Executive non-departmental public bodies, NHS Public Bodies, Scottish Water and further education colleges in Scotland.

=== Standards Commission for Scotland ===
The Standards Commission for Scotland is responsible for enforcing the Code of Conduct. They act upon reports presented by the Chief Investigation Officer, a separate office. Members of the commission are appointed by Scottish Ministers. The commission has a protocol for shared aims and objectives with the Scottish Public Services Ombudsman.

=== Commissioner for Ethical Standards in Public Life in Scotland ===
The Commissioner for Ethical Standards in Public Life in Scotland (CESPLS) is responsible for investigating any complaints made under the Code of Conduct. They are appointed by the Scottish Ministers and are operationally independent of the Standards Commission. The CESPLS will make a determination if the complaint is relevant or if another body can assist the complainant; the CESPLS must explain their decision. If an investigation is carried out the CESPLS will produce a report for the commission. The commission can choose to direct the CESPLS to conduct further investigations, convene a hearing or do neither.

From 17 January 2002 to 31 March 2011 the CESPLS was known as the Chief Investigating Officer (CIO).

=== Restricted applicability ===
The act does not cover the conduct of Members of the Scottish Parliament, Scottish Ministers, employees of the Scottish Government or public bodies not mentioned in the act. These complaints are handled by the Scottish Parliamentary Standards Commissioner for MSPs, the First Minister for ministers and Scottish Public Services Ombudsman for employees of the Scottish Government. Other complaints need to be forwarded to the Scottish Government.

The act is designed to apply to officers and members who are responsible for spending public money, as such the public bodies not covered usually spend a limited amount of public money. Such bodies include community councils which spend little, if any, public money. Further, certain public bodies cannot be covered due to legal restrictions arising from how they were established.

== Reception ==
The Catholic Church criticised the legislation for only replacing section 28 with a section on teaching children the importance of stable families, rather than emphasising marriage.

== See also ==
- List of acts of the Scottish Parliament from 1999
- Standards Board for England
