= Aliança Nacional LGBTI =

Brazilian LGBTI association

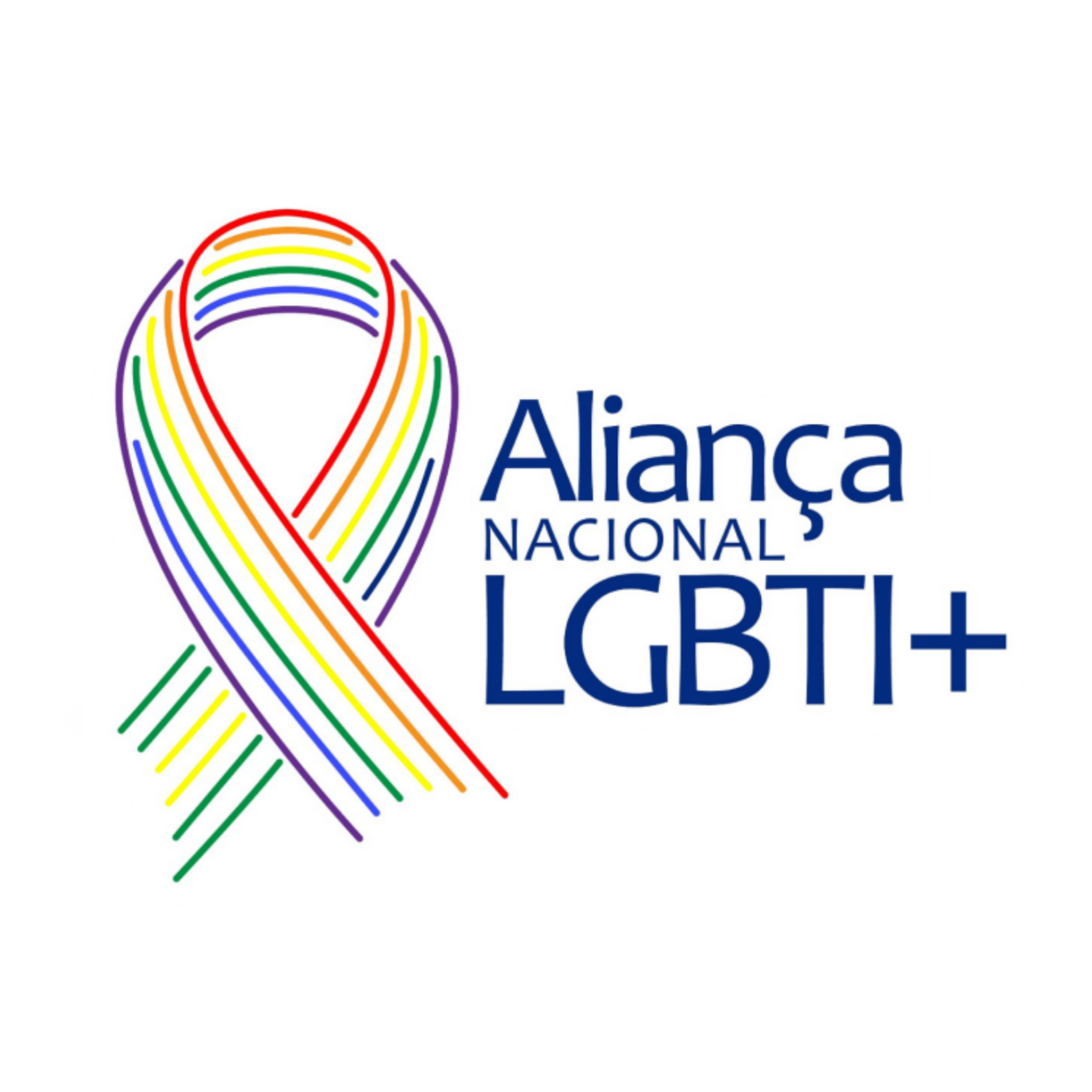
- Founded: 2003
- Headquarters: Curitiba, Brazil
- Leader: Toni Reis
- Website: https://aliancalgbti.org.br/

The National LGBTI Alliance (Brazilian Portuguese: Aliança Nacional LGBTI) is a non-profit, multi-party civil society organization in Brazil, legally registered in 2003. Since 2009, it has operated nationally as a network promoting and defending the human rights and citizenship of the Brazilian LGBTI+ community, with state, district and municipal coordination offices covering various thematic areas.

The organization also publishes open letters and organized seminars and lectures on sexual and gender diversity in the country.

The network organizes initiatives such as the Vote com Orgulho (lit. 'Vote with Pride') program, which registers LGBTQ candidates throughout Brazil.

== History ==
In 2018, the Aliança Nacional LGBTI and the Rede GayLatino, with support from UNAIDS Brazil, launched the LGBTI+ Communication Manual. The launch took place in the Federal Senate, during a public hearing of the Human Rights Commission, on the eve of the International Day Against Homophobia, Transphobia and Biphobia.

In November 2019, the Aliança Nacional LGBTI, in partnership with other entities, held the International LGBTI+ Congress at the Federal University of Paraná in Rebouças.

In 2022, the Aliança Nacional LGBTI joined the national coalition Coalizão Nacional LGBTI+ por Cidadania, along with other groups.

== See also ==
- Associação Brasileira de Lésbicas, Gays, Bissexuais, Travestis, Transexuais e Intersexos
