= Local Government Act 1986 =

Act of the Parliament of the United Kingdom

Local Government Act 1986 (Note: Section 12(1).)
- Act of Parliament
- Parliament of the United Kingdom
- Long title: An Act to require rating authorities to set a rate on or before 1st April; to prohibit political publicity and otherwise restrain local authority publicity; to require the mortgagor's consent and make other provision in connection with the disposal of local authority mortgages; to amend the law as to the effect of retirement and re-election of, and the allowances payable to, members of certain authorities; and for connected purposes.
- Citation: 1986 c. 10
- Territorial extent: England and Wales; Scotland (in part); (Note: Section 12(2).)

Dates
- Royal assent: 26 March 1986
- Commencement: various (Note: Section 12(2).)
Other legislation
Amended by	Local Government and Housing Act 1989; Local Government Act 2003; Policing and Crime Act 2017

Status: Amended

Text of statute as originally enacted

Revised text of statute as amended

Text of the Local Government Act 1986 as in force today (including any amendments) within the United Kingdom, from legislation.gov.uk.

The Local Government Act 1986 (c. 10) is an act of the Parliament of the United Kingdom.

The act was passed primarily in response to the use of publicity by the Greater London Council in its attempt to prevent the passing of the bill for the Local Government Act 1985.

== Provisions ==
=== Publicity ===
Section 2 of the act prohibited councils from spending on anything that would imply support for a political party.

Section 4 of the act states that the government can publish a code of practice on local authority publicity. Section 6 of the act defines publicity as anything that is addressed to the public.

=== Section 2A ===
Section 28 of the Local Government Act 1988 added the now-repealed Section 2A to this Act, restricting local authorities from "promoting homosexuality".

== See also ==
- Local Government Act

== Bibliography ==
- Halsbury's Statutes of England and Wales. Fourth Edition. 2009 Reissue. LexisNexis. Volume 25(2). Pages 807 to 815.
- "The Local Government Act 1986". Halsbury's Statutes of England. Butterworths. London. 1987. Binder 56: Continuation Binder 1986. Page 167.
- Peter Allsop (ed). "Local Government Act 1986*". Current Law Statutes Annotated 1986. Sweet & Maxwell. Stevens & Sons. London. W Green & Son. Edinburgh. 1987. Volume 1. Pages 10 to 10/12.
- Halsbury's Statutory Instruments. Volume 11. pp 77, 203, 204, 249 and 415.
- Tom F Richardson. Public Relations in Local Government. Heinemann Professional Publishing. 1988. Pages 33 and 56 to 58.
- Brian Harvey. "Public relations in local government". Sam Black (ed). Practice of Public Relations. Fourth Edition. 1995. Routledge. 2011. p 86.
- Dawn Oliver. Government in the United Kingdom. Open University Press. 1991. Pages 83 and 84. Google.
- Bailey and Paddison. The Reform of Local Government Finance in Britain. Routledge. London and New York. 1988. Reprinted 2006. Pages 52 and 54.
