= Local Government Act 2003 =

Act of the Parliament of the United Kingdom

Local Government Act 2003 (Note: Section 129(1).)
- Act of Parliament
- Parliament of the United Kingdom
- Long title: An Act to make provision about finance, and other provision, in connection with local and certain other authorities; to provide for changing the dates of local elections in 2004; to amend the Audit Commission Act 1998; and for connected purposes.
- Citation: 2003 c. 26
- Territorial extent: England and Wales; Scotland (in part); Northern Ireland (in part); Gibraltar (in part); (Note: Section 129(2)–(8).)

Dates
- Royal assent: 18 September 2003
- Commencement: Various (Note: Section 128.)
Other legislation
| Amends | Public Works Loans Act 1965; Public Works Loans Act 1967; Local Government Act 1986; Social Security Administration Act 1992; Police Act 1996; Education Act 1996; Political Parties, Elections and Referendums Act 2000 |
| Amended by | Public Audit (Wales) Act 2004; Government of Wales Act 2006; Cities and Local Government Devolution Act 2016; Policing and Crime Act 2017; Non-Domestic Rating Act 2023 |
| Relates to | Local Government and Public Involvement in Health Act 2007 |

Status: Amended

Text of statute as originally enacted

Revised text of statute as amended

The Local Government Act 2003 (c. 26) is an act of the Parliament of the United Kingdom.

== Provisions ==
It made various changes to the administration of local government in the United Kingdom. Although it contained mainly financial provisions, section 122 repealed section 2A of the Local Government Act 1986, the enactment prohibiting local authorities from 'promoting' homosexuality, in England and Wales.

It also created the concept of "business improvement districts".

The act made community sports clubs eligible for 80% rate relief.

== Legislative passage ==
During the passage of the act, the Conservative Party suggested that the government should implement a system of allowing parental ballots on sex education material.

== See also ==
- The Ethical Standards in Public Life etc. (Scotland) Act 2000, the actwhich repealed section 2A in Scotland.
