= Local Government Act 1988 =

Act of the Parliament of the United Kingdom

Local Government Act 1988 (Note: Section 42(1).)
- Act of Parliament
- Parliament of the United Kingdom
- Long title: An Act to secure that local and other public authorities undertake certain activities only if they can do so competitively; to regulate certain functions of local and other public authorities in connection with public supply or works contracts; to authorise and regulate the provision of financial assistance by local authorities for certain housing purposes; to prohibit the promotion of homosexuality by local authorities; to make provision about local authorities' publicity, local government administration, the powers of auditors, land held by public bodies, direct labour organisations, arrangements under the Employment and Training Act 1973, the Commission for Local Authority Accounts in Scotland, the auditing of accounts of local authorities in Scotland, and dog registration, dog licences and stray dogs; and for connected purposes.
- Citation: 1998 c. 9
- Territorial extent: England and Wales; Scotland; (Note: Section 42(2).)

Dates
- Royal assent: 24 March 1988
- Commencement: 24 March 1988 (Note: Section 4(b) of the Interpretation Act 1978.)
Other legislation
Repeals/revokes	Dog Licenses Act 1959
Amended by	Statute Law (Repeals) Act 1993; Audit Commission Act 1998; Ethical Standards in Public Life etc. (Scotland) Act 2000; Scottish Public Services Ombudsman Act 2002; Local Government Act 2003; Statute Law (Repeals) Act 2004; National Health Service (Consequential Provisions) Act 2006; Policing and Crime Act 2017; Procurement Act 2023

Status: Amended

Text of statute as originally enacted

Revised text of statute as amended

Text of the Local Government Act 1988 as in force today (including any amendments) within the United Kingdom, from legislation.gov.uk.

The Local Government Act 1988 (c. 9) is an act of the Parliament of the United Kingdom. It was famous for its controversial section 28. This section prohibited local authorities from promoting, in a specified category of schools, "the teaching of the acceptability of homosexuality as a pretended family relationship".

The act included a number of other provisions affecting local authorities. Part I introduced compulsory tendering of contracts for certain types of activities. Part II dealt with aspects of public sector contracting. Part III allowed housing authorities to provide financial assistance to people living in private property. Section 38, part of the "miscellaneous and general" coverage of Part IV, abolished dog licences.

== Provisions ==
=== Part 1 ===
Part 1 of the act provided for the following activities to be subject to compulsory competitive tendering (CCT):

- refuse collection
- cleaning of buildings and "other cleaning"
- school and welfare catering
- "other catering"
- grounds maintenance
- vehicle repair and maintenance.

=== Section 17 ===
Section 17(1) stipulates that public bodies covered by the Act are not permitted to take "non-commercial considerations" into account when carrying out their functions relating to awarding contracts. The Act lists non-commercial matters relating to public supply or works contracts, including terms and conditions of employment offered by contractors to their workers, the involvement of contractors with irrelevant fields of Government policy, and the conduct of contractors or workers in industrial disputes.

In 2000, the Employment Sub-committee of the House of Commons Education and Employment Select Committee suggested that this requirement needed to be amended so that local councils could address local employment gaps by including local labour clauses in appropriate contracts.

=== Section 28 ===
Section 28 stated that a local authority "shall not intentionally promote homosexuality or publish material with the intention of promoting homosexuality" or "promote the teaching in any maintained school of the acceptability of homosexuality as a pretended family relationship". This section was repealed in 2000.

== See also ==
- Direct service organisation
