= List of acts of the Scottish Parliament from 2011 =

This is a list of acts of the Scottish Parliament passed in 2011. Acts of the Scottish Parliament are enacted by the Scottish Parliament, which has legislative authority over devolved matters in relation to Scotland under the authority of the Scotland Act 1998. Acts are cited by calendar year, in the same fashion as acts of Parliament of the United Kingdom. Each act passed in a respective year is numbered consecutively with Arabic numerals, following the prefix "asp".

16 acts of the Scottish Parliament were passed in 2011.

indicates that an act has been transcribed on Wikisource, indicates that an act is available to view at legislation.gov.uk, and indicates the location of the original act in the Parliamentary Archives.

== Acts of the Scottish Parliament ==
Short title	Citation	Royal assent
Long title
Children's Hearings (Scotland) Act 2011	2011 asp 1	6 January 2011
An Act of the Scottish Parliament to restate and amend the law relating to children's hearings; and for connected purposes.
Forth Crossing Act 2011	2011 asp 2	20 January 2011
An Act of the Scottish Parliament to give the Scottish Ministers power to construct a new bridge over the Firth of Forth and to construct and improve associated roads and structures; to authorise the acquisition, or temporary possession and use, of land for construction and improvement works; and for connected purposes.
Historic Environment (Amendment) (Scotland) Act 2011	2011 asp 3	23 February 2011
An Act of the Scottish Parliament to make provision amending certain aspects of the law relating to ancient monuments and listed buildings, including provision in relation to unauthorised works, powers of enforcement in connection with such works, offences and fines, powers of entry to ancient monuments, the control and management of certain ancient monuments, and liability for the expenses of urgent works on listed buildings; to make provision for the creation of inventories of gardens and designed landscapes and of battlefields; to provide for grants and loans in respect of the development and understanding of matters of historic and other interest; and for connected purposes.
Budget (Scotland) Act 2011	2011 asp 4	16 March 2011
An Act of the Scottish Parliament to make provision, for financial year 2011/12, for the use of resources by the Scottish Administration and certain bodies whose expenditure is payable out of the Scottish Consolidated Fund, for authorising the payment of sums out of the Fund and for the maximum amounts of borrowing by certain statutory bodies; to make provision, for financial year 2012/13, for authorising the payment of sums out of the Fund on a temporary basis; and for connected purposes.
Patient Rights (Scotland) Act 2011	2011 asp 5	31 March 2011
An Act (Note: Unusually, the long title simply begins with the words "An Act", rather than the conventional "An Act of the Scottish Parliament".) to make provision about the rights of patients when receiving health care; to make further provision about eligibility under the scheme made under section 28 of the Smoking, Health and Social Care (Scotland) Act 2005; (Note: Smoking, Health and Social Care (Scotland) Act 2005 (asp 13)) and for connected purposes.
Wildlife and Natural Environment (Scotland) Act 2011	2011 asp 6	7 April 2011
An Act of the Scottish Parliament to make provision in connection with wildlife and the natural environment; and for connected purposes.
Damages (Scotland) Act 2011	2011 asp 7	7 April 2011
An Act of the Scottish Parliament to make further provision as regards rights to damages in respect of personal injuries and death; and for connected purposes.
Property Factors (Scotland) Act 2011	2011 asp 8	7 April 2011
An Act of the Scottish Parliament to establish a register of property factors and require property factors to be registered; to make provision in relation to the resolution of disputes between homeowners and property factors; and for connected purposes.
Reservoirs (Scotland) Act 2011	2011 asp 9	12 April 2011
An Act of the Scottish Parliament to make provision about the regulation of the construction, alteration and management of certain reservoirs, in particular in relation to the risk of flooding from such reservoirs, for the repeal and replacement of the Reservoirs Act 1975, (Note: Reservoirs Act 1975 (c. 23)) about offences to facilitate the achievement of the environmental objectives set out in river basin management plans; and for connected purposes.
Local Electoral Administration (Scotland) Act 2011	2011 asp 10	20 April 2011
An Act of the Scottish Parliament to establish an Electoral Management Board for Scotland; to confer functions on the Electoral Commission in relation to local government elections; and for connected purposes.
Certification of Death (Scotland) Act 2011	2011 asp 11	20 April 2011
An Act of the Scottish Parliament to make provision about the certification of death and still-birth certificates; to make provision for medical reviewers, the senior medical reviewer and their functions; and for connected purposes.
Public Records (Scotland) Act 2011	2011 asp 12	20 April 2011
An Act of the Scottish Parliament to make provision about the management of records by certain authorities; to amend the Public Records (Scotland) Act 1937 (Note: Public Records (Scotland) Act 1937 (1 Edw. 8 & 1 Geo. 6. c. 43)) (c.43) in relation to the transmission of court records to the Keeper of the Records of Scotland; and for connected purposes.
Domestic Abuse (Scotland) Act 2011	2011 asp 13	20 April 2011
An Act of the Scottish Parliament to amend the Protection from Harassment Act 1997 (Note: Protection from Harassment Act 1997 (c. 40)) by making provision in relation to harassment amounting to domestic abuse; to make breach of an interdict relating to domestic abuse with a power of arrest attached an offence; and for connected purposes.
Private Rented Housing (Scotland) Act 2011	2011 asp 14	20 April 2011
An Act of the Scottish Parliament to make provision about private rented housing.
Forced Marriage etc. (Protection and Jurisdiction) (Scotland) Act 2011	2011 asp 15	27 April 2011
An Act of the Scottish Parliament to make provision for protecting persons from being forced into marriage without their free and full consent and for protecting persons who have been forced into marriage without such consent; for amending the jurisdiction of the sheriff court in relation to actions for declarator of nullity of marriage; and for connected purposes.
Double Jeopardy (Scotland) Act 2011	2011 asp 16	27 April 2011
An Act of the Scottish Parliament to make provision as to the circumstances in which a person convicted or acquitted of an offence may be prosecuted anew; and for connected purposes.

== See also ==
- List of acts of the Scottish Parliament
