= Smoking, Health and Social Care (Scotland) Act 2005 =

Act of the Scottish Parliament

Smoking, Health and Social Care (Scotland) Act 2005 (Note: Section 43(1).)
- Act of the Scottish Parliament
- Scottish Parliament
- Long title: An Act of the Scottish Parliament to prohibit smoking in certain wholly or substantially enclosed places; to enable the Scottish Ministers by order to vary the minimum age limit of those to whom tobacco may be sold; to make provision in relation to general dental services, general ophthalmic services, personal dental services, pharmaceutical care services and detection of vision problems in children; to make provision in relation to disqualification by the NHS Tribunal; to enable the Scottish Ministers to establish a scheme for the making of payments to certain persons infected with hepatitis C as a result of NHS treatment and to certain persons infected with the virus by transmission of it from a person infected with it as a result of such treatment; to amend the Regulation of Care (Scotland) Act 2001 as respects what constitutes an independent health care service, the implementation of certain decisions by the Scottish Commission for the Regulation of Care or the Scottish Social Services Council, the provision of information to the Council and the minimum frequency of inspection of care services by the Commission; to make provision providing further time for applications to be made for registration of child care agencies and housing support services under the Regulation of Care (Scotland) Act 2001 and provide authorisation for the payment of certain grants to such services while not registered under that Act; to amend the Adults with Incapacity (Scotland) Act 2000 as respects authorisation of medical treatment; to amend the Public Health (Scotland) Act 1897 to introduce a right of appeal in certain cases under that Act; to enable the Scottish Ministers to form, participate in and provide assistance to companies for the purpose of providing facilities or services for persons exercising functions under the National Health Service (Scotland) Act 1978 or of making money available to the health service in Scotland; to amend the rules as to membership of and other matters relating to the Scottish Hospital Endowments Research Trust; and for connected purposes.
- Citation: 2005 asp 13
- Introduced by: Andy Kerr, Minister for Health and Community Care
- Territorial extent: Scotland

Dates
- Royal assent: 5 August 2005
- Commencement: various (Note: Section 43(2)–(4).)
Other legislation
Amends	Public Health (Scotland) Act 1897; National Health Service (Scotland) Act 1978; Health Services Act 1980; Health and Social Services and Social Security Adjudications Act 1983; Dentists Act 1984; Health and Social Security Act 1984; National Health Service (Amendment) Act 1986; Health and Medicines Act 1988; National Health Service and Community Care Act 1990; National Health Service (Primary Care) Act 1997; Police Act 1997; Health Act 1999; Public Finance and Accountability (Scotland) Act 2000; Ethical Standards in Public Life etc. (Scotland) Act 2000; Regulation of Care (Scotland) Act 2001; Community Care and Health (Scotland) Act 2002; Freedom of Information (Scotland) Act 2002; Scottish Public Services Ombudsman Act 2002; Mental Health (Care and Treatment) (Scotland) Act 2003; Primary Medical Services (Scotland) Act 2004
Amended by	Tobacco and Primary Medical Services (Scotland) Act 2010; Health (Tobacco, Nicotine etc. and Care) (Scotland) Act 2016; Health (Tobacco, Nicotine etc. and Care) (Scotland) Act 2016 (Supplementary Provision) Regulations 2022; Tobacco and Vapes Act 2026
Relates to	Health Act 2006

Status: Amended

History of passage through the Parliament

Text of statute as originally enacted

Revised text of statute as amended

Text of the Smoking, Health and Social Care (Scotland) Act 2005 as in force today (including any amendments) within the United Kingdom, from legislation.gov.uk.

The Smoking, Health and Social Care (Scotland) Act 2005 (asp 13) is an act of the Scottish Parliament which prohibited smoking in some situations and made certain other reforms to healthcare in Scotland.

== Context ==
Scotland was the first jurisdiction in the United Kingdom to legislate for a ban on smoking in public.

== Provisions ==
=== Smoking and tobacco ===
The act banned smoking in public places including pubs, restaurants, an offices, theatres, bingo halls and public toilets. The act included an exemption for prison cells and residential care centres.

The act increased the minimum age to buy tobacco from 16 to 18.

The act prohibited allowing others to smoke in no-smoking premises, requiring owners of no-smoking premises to display warning notices.

=== Other policies ===
The act also included provisions concerning free eye tests and dental checks, and also authorised payouts for those who contracted hepatitis C from NHS products.

== Reception ==
The legislation was supported by all parties in the Scottish Parliament except the Scottish Conservatives.

== Implementation ==
The ban on smoking in public came into force on 26 March 2006.

Compliance rates initially ranged from 92% to 98%.

== Further developments ==
Jack McConnell described the legislation as his proudest moment.

== See also ==
- Smoking in the United Kingdom
- Tobacco control
