= Patient Rights (Scotland) Act 2011 =

Act of the Scottish Parliament

- Act of the Scottish Parliament
- Scottish Parliament
- Long title: An Act to make provision about the rights of patients when receiving health care; to make further provision about eligibility under the scheme made under section 28 of the Smoking, Health and Social Care (Scotland) Act 2005; and for connected purposes.
- Citation: 2011 asp 5

Dates
- Royal assent: 31 March 2011

Other legislation
- Amends: National Health Service (Scotland) Act 1978
- Repeals/revokes: Hospital Complaints Procedure Act 1985
- Amended by: Public Bodies (Joint Working) (Scotland) Act 2014; Forensic Medical Services (Victims of Sexual Offences) (Scotland) Act 2021

Status: Amended

Text of statute as originally enacted

Text of the Patient Rights (Scotland) Act 2011 as in force today (including any amendments) within the United Kingdom, from legislation.gov.uk.

The Patient Rights (Scotland) Act 2011 (asp 5) is an act of the Scottish Parliament.

== Provisions ==
The act states that healthcare providers must consider the needs of patients, consider what would be the most beneficial to the patient, taking into account their circumstances and preferences and encourage them to take part in decisions about their health and wellbeing, and provide them with information and support to do so.

The act established the treatment time guarantee which guarantees that certain groups of patients will start their treatment within 12 weeks of agreeing to treatment with the relevant NHS clinician. There is nothing patients can do to enforce this right.

It established the Patient Advice and Support Service.

== Application ==
Colin McIntyre from Glasgow was sent a letter guaranteeing his hip replacement within 12 weeks and that he would be offered an appointment before 16 February 2017. He subsequently got a phone call from the hospital telling him it would take eight or nine months. He took the view that the guarantee was "not worth the paper it is written on". He used his European Health Insurance Card to arrange his operation in France - within two weeks, and most of the cost was refunded by the health board.
