= List of acts of the Scottish Parliament from 2023 =

This is a list of acts of the Scottish Parliament passed in 2023. Acts of the Scottish Parliament are enacted by the Scottish Parliament, which has legislative authority over devolved matters in relation to Scotland under the authority of the Scotland Act 1998. Acts are cited by calendar year, in the same fashion as acts of Parliament of the United Kingdom. Each act passed in a respective year is numbered consecutively with Arabic numerals, following the prefix "asp".

6 acts of the Scottish Parliament were passed in 2023.

indicates that an act has been transcribed on Wikisource, indicates that an act is available to view at legislation.gov.uk, and indicates the location of the original act in the Parliamentary Archives.

== Acts of the Scottish Parliament ==
Short title	Citation	Royal assent
Long title
Hunting with Dogs (Scotland) Act 2023	2023 asp 1	7 March 2023
An Act of the Scottish Parliament to make provision about the prohibition of hunting wild mammals using dogs; to make provision about the prohibition of trail hunting; and for connected purposes.
Budget (Scotland) Act 2023	2023 asp 2	27 March 2023
An Act of the Scottish Parliament to make provision, for financial year 2023/24, for the use of resources by the Scottish Administration and certain bodies whose expenditure is payable out of the Scottish Consolidated Fund, for the maximum amounts of borrowing by certain statutory bodies and for authorising the payment of sums out of the Fund; to make provision, for financial year 2024/25, for authorising the payment of sums out of the Fund on a temporary basis; and for connected purposes.
Moveable Transactions (Scotland) Act 2023	2023 asp 3	13 June 2023
An Act of the Scottish Parliament to make provision in relation to the assignation of claims; to establish a register for assignation documents in respect of such claims; to make provision in relation to the granting of security in the form of a pledge over corporeal and incorporeal moveable property; to establish a register of statutory pledges; and to end the creation of agricultural charges.
Bail and Release from Custody (Scotland) Act 2023	2023 asp 4	1 August 2023
An Act of the Scottish Parliament to make provision about the determination of questions of bail; to provide for the court, when sentencing, to have regard to time spent on certain bail conditions; to ensure prisoners are not released on Fridays and certain other days; to provide for the temporary release of long-term prisoners; to enable certain prisoners to be released early in emergency situations; to require certain public bodies to engage in planning for the release of prisoners; to provide support for released prisoners; to provide for information about prisoners to be given to persons or bodies supporting victims; and for connected purposes.
Charities (Regulation and Administration) (Scotland) Act 2023	2023 asp 5	9 August 2023
An Act of the Scottish Parliament to modify certain aspects of the law relating to the regulation and administration of charities and their assets.
Patient Safety Commissioner for Scotland Act 2023	2023 asp 6	7 November 2023
An Act of the Scottish Parliament to provide for the establishment and functions of a Patient Safety Commissioner for Scotland.

== See also ==
- List of acts of the Scottish Parliament
