= List of acts of the Scottish Parliament from 2009 =

This is a list of acts of the Scottish Parliament passed in 2009. Acts of the Scottish Parliament are enacted by the Scottish Parliament, which has legislative authority over devolved matters in relation to Scotland under the authority of the Scotland Act 1998. Acts are cited by calendar year, in the same fashion as acts of Parliament of the United Kingdom. Each act passed in a respective year is numbered consecutively with Arabic numerals, following the prefix "asp".

12 acts of the Scottish Parliament were passed in 2009.

indicates that an act has been transcribed on Wikisource, indicates that an act is available to view at legislation.gov.uk, and indicates the location of the original act in the Parliamentary Archives.

== Acts of the Scottish Parliament ==
| Short title | Citation | Royal assent |
Long title
| Scottish Parliamentary Pensions Act 2009 | 2009 asp 1 | 25 February 2009 |
An Act of the Scottish Parliament to set out rules to govern the Scottish Parliamentary Pension Scheme; to provide for the payment of resettlement grants to individuals when they stop being members of the Scottish Parliament or holding certain offices; and for connected purposes.
| Budget (Scotland) Act 2009 | 2009 asp 2 | 10 March 2009 |
An Act of the Scottish Parliament to make provision, for financial year 2009/10, for the use of resources by the Scottish Administration and certain bodies whose expenditure is payable out of the Scottish Consolidated Fund, for authorising the payment of sums out of the Fund and for the maximum amounts of borrowing by certain statutory bodies; to make provision, for financial year 2010/11, for authorising the payment of sums out of the Fund on a temporary basis; and for connected purposes.
| Disabled Persons' Parking Places (Scotland) Act 2009 | 2009 asp 3 | 1 April 2009 |
An Act of the Scottish Parliament to make provision for the duties of local authorities in relation to parking places for use by disabled persons' vehicles; and for connected purposes.
| Damages (Asbestos-related Conditions) (Scotland) Act 2009 | 2009 asp 4 | 17 April 2009 |
An Act of the Scottish Parliament to provide that certain asbestos-related conditions are actionable personal injuries; and for connected purposes.
| Health Boards (Membership and Elections) (Scotland) Act 2009 | 2009 asp 5 | 22 April 2009 |
An Act of the Scottish Parliament to make provision about the constitution of Health Boards; to provide for piloting of the election of certain members of Health Boards; to require the Scottish Ministers to report on those pilots; to confer a power to extend those elections to all Health Board areas following publication of that report; and for connected purposes.
| Flood Risk Management (Scotland) Act 2009 | 2009 asp 6 | 16 June 2009 |
An Act of the Scottish Parliament to make provision about the assessment and sustainable management of flood risks, including provision for implementing European Parliament and Council Directive 2007/60/EC; (Note: Floods Directive (2007/60/EC)) to make provision about local authorities' and the Scottish Environment Protection Agency's functions in relation to flood risk management; to amend the Reservoirs Act 1975; (Note: Reservoirs Act 1975 (c. 23)) and for connected purposes.
| Education (Additional Support for Learning) (Scotland) Act 2009 | 2009 asp 7 | 25 June 2009 |
An Act of the Scottish Parliament to amend the law in respect of placing requests in relation to the school education of children and young persons having additional support needs and in respect of arrangements between education authorities in relation to such school education; to make minor provision in relation to additional support needs; to make further provision in relation to the practice and procedure of the Additional Support Needs Tribunals for Scotland; and for connected purposes.
| Offences (Aggravation by Prejudice) (Scotland) Act 2009 | 2009 asp 8 | 8 July 2009 |
An Act of the Scottish Parliament to make provision about the aggravation of offences by prejudice relating to disability or to sexual orientation or transgender identity.
| Sexual Offences (Scotland) Act 2009 | 2009 asp 9 | 14 July 2009 |
An Act of the Scottish Parliament to make new provision about sexual offences, and for connected purposes.
| Scottish Local Government (Elections) Act 2009 | 2009 asp 10 | 21 July 2009 |
An Act of the Scottish Parliament to make provision as respects the year in which local government elections fall to be held; and to make provision in relation to the publication of information about votes cast at local government elections.
| Convention Rights Proceedings (Amendment) (Scotland) Act 2009 | 2009 asp 11 | 23 July 2009 |
An Act of the Scottish Parliament to amend the limitation period for bringing certain Convention rights proceedings by virtue of the Scotland Act 1998. (Note: Scotland Act 1998 (c. 46))
| Climate Change (Scotland) Act 2009 | 2009 asp 12 | 4 August 2009 |
An Act of the Scottish Parliament to set a target for the year 2050, an interim target for the year 2020, and to provide for annual targets, for the reduction of greenhouse gas emissions; to provide about the giving of advice to the Scottish Ministers relating to climate change; to confer power on Ministers to impose climate change duties on public bodies; to make further provision about mitigation of and adaptation to climate change; to make provision about energy efficiency, including provision enabling council tax discounts; to make provision about the reduction and recycling of waste; and for connected purposes.

== See also ==
- List of acts of the Scottish Parliament
