= Health Boards (Membership and Elections) (Scotland) Act 2009 =

Act of the Scottish Parliament

- Act of the Scottish Parliament
- Scottish Parliament
- Long title: An Act of the Scottish Parliament to make provision about the constitution of Health Boards; to provide for piloting of the election of certain members of Health Boards; to require the Scottish Ministers to report on those pilots; to confer a power to extend those elections to all Health Board areas following publication of that report; and for connected purposes.
- Citation: 2009 asp 5
- Territorial extent: Scotland

Dates
- Royal assent: 22 April 2009

Status: Amended

Text of statute as originally enacted

Text of the Health Boards (Membership and Elections) (Scotland) Act 2009 as in force today (including any amendments) within the United Kingdom, from legislation.gov.uk.

The Health Boards (Membership and Elections) (Scotland) Act 2009 (asp 5) was an act of the Scottish Parliament relating to elections to health boards.

== Background ==
In 2006, the Labour Co-operative MSP Bill Butler introduced a private member's bill to provide for direct elections to health boards.

In the 2007 election, the Scottish National Party proposed elections to health boards.

== Provisions ==
The act provides for piloting of the election of certain members of Health Boards and to confer a power to extend those elections to all Health Boards, which was passed by the Parliament on 12 March 2009 and received Royal Assent on 22 April 2009. Anyone aged 16 and over will be eligible to vote.

In 2012 an evaluation of the Health Board elections and alternative pilots was published. Two NHS boards, Dumfries and Galloway and Fife held elections for 10 and 12 members respectively. Two other boards, Grampian and Lothian explored alternative ways of recruiting and selecting two new appointed members each.

The research found direct elections advantages and drawbacks. They directly address issues of local democracy and accountability so have potential to change the way boards function through increasing the level of challenge. A counter argument is that elected boards may not be able to function as effective corporate entities but the researchers saw no evidence of this during the pilot period.

== Reception ==
The legislation was criticised by three health boards (NHS Ayrshire and Arran, NHS Lothian, NHS Tayside), who said that there were better alternatives, such as increasing public participation.

== See also ==
- List of acts of the Scottish Parliament from 1999
