= Scottish Parliamentary Pensions Act 2009 =

Act of the Scottish Parliament

- Act of the Scottish Parliament
- Scottish Parliament
- Long title: An Act of the Scottish Parliament to set out rules to govern the Scottish Parliamentary Pension Scheme; to provide for the payment of resettlement grants to individuals when they stop being members of the Scottish Parliament or holding certain offices; and for connected purposes.
- Citation: 2009 asp 1
- Territorial extent: Scotland

Dates
- Royal assent: 25 February 2009

Status: Amended

Text of statute as originally enacted

Text of the Scottish Parliamentary Pensions Act 2009 as in force today (including any amendments) within the United Kingdom, from legislation.gov.uk.

The Scottish Parliamentary Pensions Act 2009 (asp 1) was an act of the Scottish Parliament to set out rules to govern the Scottish Parliamentary Pension Scheme which was passed by the Parliament on 22 January 2009 and received royal assent on 25 February 2009.

== Provisions ==
The act introduced resettlement grants for ministers of a quarter of their salary - this amounted to £7,270 for Mark McDonald when he resigned in 2018. Resettlements grants were automatically made 90 days after departure.

The act allowed MSPs who stand down or lose at a Holyrood election to receive a payment of between six and twelve months' salary automatically.

The act transferred responsibility for the management of the Scottish Parliamentary Pension Scheme from the Scottish Parliament Corporate Body to fund trustees.

== See also ==
- List of acts of the Scottish Parliament from 1999
