= Tobacco Advertising and Promotion Act 2002 =

Act of the Parliament of the United Kingdom

Tobacco Advertising and Promotion Act 2002 (Note: Section 22(4).)
- Act of Parliament
- Parliament of the United Kingdom
- Long title: An Act to control the advertising and promotion of tobacco products; and for connected purposes.
- Citation: 2002 c. 36
- Territorial extent: England and Wales; Scotland; Northern Ireland (Note: Section 22(5).)

Dates
- Royal assent: 7 November 2002
- Commencement: Various (Note: Section 22(1)–(3).)
Other legislation
| Amended by | Tobacco Advertising and Promotion Act 2002 etc. (Amendment) Regulations 2006; Health Act 2009; Tobacco and Primary Medical Services (Scotland) Act 2010; Tobacco Products and Nicotine Inhaling Products (Amendment etc.) (EU Exit) Regulations 2019; Tobacco and Vapes Act 2026 |

Status: Amended

Text of statute as originally enacted

Revised text of statute as amended

The Tobacco Advertising and Promotion Act 2002 (c. 36) is an act of the Parliament of the United Kingdom. The legislation ended a century of tobacco poster, magazine and newspaper advertising and stopped tobacco sponsorship of events, banning advertising and promotion outside of specialist tobacconists. TV advertising had been banned previously.

== Bill introduction ==
The advertising ban had been a Labour manifesto pledge, however the bill was introduced by Liberal Democrat, Lord Clement-Jones, who commented that "I've put it forward because the government has clearly had cold feet about tobacco advertising and sponsorship".

This came some years after a controversy that began in 1997, involving political donations from Formula One boss Bernie Ecclestone and the government proposing to exempt Formula One from tobacco advertising bans.

== Passage ==
The bill was introduced in the House of Lords on 11 July 2001, received its second reading on 2 November 2001, and its third reading on 15 March 2002. It then moved to the House of Commons on 18 March 2002, where it had its second reading on 29 April 2002, and third reading on 21 October 2002. The legislation was passed as a private member's bill.

== Provisions ==
Under this act, the advertising of tobacco products to the public was banned in the United Kingdom, except on the premises of specialist tobacconists. This came into effect on 14 February 2003.

The act also contained an exemption, including for Formula One, with tobacco sponsorship of internationally important sports events, such as Formula One and World Snooker, banned from the later date of 31 July 2005.

== Reception ==
The legislation was supported by Cancer Research UK and the British Heart Foundation. To promote the introduction of the ban, Alan Milburn (Health Secretary) and Hazel Blears (Public Health Minister) ripped down a tobacco billboard advert in Lambeth, to reveal one stating "‘Tobacco Advertising – we can live without it. Don’t give up giving up".

== Definition changes ==
In June 2025, supermarkets Morrisons and Sainsbury's were warned by the government that advertisements for heated tobacco products could be illegal under this act. The supermarkets publicly defended their advertisements by citing the definition of a “tobacco product” in the act which is "a product consisting wholly or partly of tobacco and intended to be smoked, sniffed, sucked or chewed" and claiming that heated tobacco products are outside of this definition.

The definition was adjusted on 29 April 2026 to "a product consisting wholly or partly of tobacco and intended to be smoked, sniffed, sucked or chewed or consumed in any other way", as a result of section 138 of the Tobacco and Vapes Act 2026.

== See also ==
- Smoking in the United Kingdom
