= Certification of Death (Scotland) Act 2011 =

Act of the Scottish Parliament

- Act of the Scottish Parliament
- Scottish Parliament
- Long title: An Act of the Scottish Parliament to make provision about the certification of death and still-birth certificates; to make provision for medical reviewers, the senior medical reviewer and their functions; and for connected purposes.
- Citation: 2011 asp 11

Dates
- Royal assent: 20 April 2011
- Commencement: 21 April 2011; 8 June 2013; 13 May 2015

Other legislation
- Amends: Registration of Births, Deaths and Marriages (Scotland) Act 1965; National Health Service (Scotland) Act 1978

Status: Current legislation

Text of statute as originally enacted

Text of the Certification of Death (Scotland) Act 2011 as in force today (including any amendments) within the United Kingdom, from legislation.gov.uk.

The Certification of Death (Scotland) Act 2011 (asp 11) is an act of the Scottish Parliament relating to the certification of deaths in Scotland.

== Background ==
The act was a response to a series of scandals involving cremations and the certification of death, including the murders committed by Harold Shipman.

== Provisions ==
The act abolished fees for cremation forms.

The act requires that 10% of death certificates be sampled for review.

The act gives relatives a right to review a death certificate if they have concerns.

Reviews of death certificates are carried out by a team at Health Improvement Scotland, who are required to act independently.
