= List of acts of the Scottish Parliament from 2025 =

This is a list of acts of the Scottish Parliament passed in 2025. Acts of the Scottish Parliament are enacted by the Scottish Parliament, which has legislative authority over devolved matters in relation to Scotland under the authority of the Scotland Act 1998.

Acts are cited by calendar year, in the same fashion as acts of Parliament of the United Kingdom. Each act passed in a respective year is numbered consecutively with Arabic numerals, following the prefix "asp".

15 acts of the Scottish Parliament were passed in 2025.

indicates that an act has been transcribed on Wikisource, indicates that an act is available to view at legislation.gov.uk, and indicates the location of the original act in the Parliamentary Archives.

== Acts of the Scottish Parliament ==
Short title	Citation	Royal assent
Long title
Prisoners (Early Release) (Scotland) Act 2025	2025 asp 1	22 January 2025
An Act of the Scottish Parliament to amend the rules as to the automatic early release of prisoners from prison and of children from detention; and for connected purposes.
Social Security (Amendment) (Scotland) Act 2025	2025 asp 2	23 January 2025
An Act of the Scottish Parliament to modify the Social Security (Scotland) Act 2018 (Note: Social Security (Scotland) Act 2018 (asp 19)) to make further provision about social security; and for connected purposes.
Judicial Factors (Scotland) Act 2025	2025 asp 3	27 January 2025
An Act of the Scottish Parliament to make provision about judicial factors; the appointment and functions of the Accountant of Court; and for connected purposes.
Scottish Elections (Representation and Reform) Act 2025	2025 asp 4	29 January 2025
An Act of the Scottish Parliament to make further provision about eligibility of elected representatives in the Scottish Parliament and in local government and to reform certain aspects of the law relating to Scottish parliamentary and local government elections.
Police (Ethics, Conduct and Scrutiny) (Scotland) Act 2025	2025 asp 5	4 March 2025
An Act of the Scottish Parliament to make provision about a code of ethics and a duty of candour for the police; to make provision about vetting of constables and police staff; to make provision about procedures for misconduct and the consequences of certain conduct by constables; to make provision about the functions of the Police Investigations and Review Commissioner; and to make provision for a board to advise the Police Investigations and Review Commissioner.
Welfare of Dogs (Scotland) Act 2025	2025 asp 6	19 March 2025
An Act of the Scottish Parliament to make provision as to a code of practice in relation to the acquisition of dogs; and to ensure public awareness and understanding of the code of practice.
Budget (Scotland) Act 2025	2025 asp 7	28 March 2025
An Act of the Scottish Parliament to make provision, for financial year 2025/26, for the use of resources by the Scottish Administration and certain bodies whose expenditure is payable out of the Scottish Consolidated Fund, for the maximum amounts of borrowing by certain statutory bodies and for authorising the payment of sums out of the Fund; to make provision, for financial year 2026/27, for authorising the payment of sums out of the Fund on a temporary basis; and for connected purposes.
Regulation of Legal Services (Scotland) Act 2025	2025 asp 8	27 June 2025
An Act of the Scottish Parliament to make provision in relation to the regulation of legal services.
Care Reform (Scotland) Act 2025	2025 asp 9	22 July 2025
An Act of the Scottish Parliament to make provision about the processing of health and social care information; to make provision about the delivery and regulation of social care; and for connected purposes.
Scottish Languages Act 2025	2025 asp 10	31 July 2025
An Act of the Scottish Parliament to make provision about support for the Gaelic and Scots languages; to make provision about education in relation to Gaelic and Scots; and for connected purposes.
Education (Scotland) Act 2025	2025 asp 11	6 August 2025
An Act of the Scottish Parliament to provide for the establishment and functions of Qualifications Scotland; to provide for the establishment and functions of the office of His Majesty's Chief Inspector of Education in Scotland; and for connected purposes.
Victims, Witnesses, and Justice Reform (Scotland) Act 2025	2025 asp 12	30 October 2025
An Act of the Scottish Parliament to establish a Victims and Witnesses Commissioner for Scotland; to make provision for the investigation and prosecution of crime, and the conduct and scheduling of criminal and civil proceedings, to be done in a trauma-informed way; to make provision about the rights of victims to receive information, give views, and be referred to victim support services; to make provision about the release of prisoners; to make provision for special measures for vulnerable witnesses and vulnerable parties in civil proceedings, including the special measure of prohibiting the personal conduct of certain cases; to abolish the not proven verdict and to make provision about the size of juries in criminal trials and the number of jurors needed to deliver guilty verdicts; to establish a new court to try persons accused of certain sexual offences; to make provision about special measures for vulnerable witnesses in certain criminal cases; to provide for anonymity for victims of certain sexual offences; to provide for complainers' legal representatives to be heard in relation to applications to admit certain evidence in sexual offences cases; to make provision about non-harassment orders; to make provision about the enforcement of protective orders made outwith Scotland; and for connected purposes.
Housing (Scotland) Act 2025	2025 asp 13	6 November 2025
An Act of the Scottish Parliament to make provision about housing, including provision about rent control; evictions and damages for unlawful evictions; residential tenants keeping pets and making changes to let property; unclaimed tenancy deposits; registration of letting agents; ending of joint tenancies; delivery of notices by social landlords; conversion of assured tenancies; homelessness prevention; mobile homes; fuel poverty; the new homes ombudsman; and for connected purposes.
Criminal Justice Modernisation and Abusive Domestic Behaviour Reviews (Scotland) Act 2025	2025 asp 14	19 November 2025
An Act of the Scottish Parliament to modify the law in relation to procedures in the criminal courts; and to make provision for the holding of reviews to enable lessons to be learned following abusive domestic behaviour.
Land Reform (Scotland) Act 2025	2025 asp 15	16 December 2025
An Act of the Scottish Parliament to make provision about the management and transfer of large holdings of land; to require the Scottish Ministers to make publicly available a model lease for environmental purposes; to modify the law on small landholdings and agricultural holdings; and for connected purposes.

== See also ==
- List of acts of the Scottish Parliament
