= Members' Bills in the Scottish Parliament =

Type of bill in the Scottish Parliament

A members' bill in the Scottish Parliament is a type of bill that can be introduced by members of the Scottish Parliament. Less parliamentary time is given to such bills and as a result only a minority of members' bills actually become law. Such bills can be used however to create publicity for a cause or issue and can affect legislation indirectly.

Title of act/bill	Presented by	Party	Constituency
Sea Fisheries (Shellfish) Amendment (Scotland) Act 2000	Tavish Scott	Liberal Democrat	Shetland (constituency)
Mortgage Rights (Scotland) Act 2001	Cathie Craigie	Labour	Cumbernauld and Kilsyth
Leasehold Casualties (Scotland) Act 2001	Adam Ingram	SNP	Carrick, Cumnock and Doon Valley
Abolition of Poindings and Warrant Sales Act 2001	Tommy Sheridan	Scottish Socialist	Glasgow (region)
Protection of Wild Mammals (Scotland) Act 2002	Mike Watson	Labour	Glasgow Cathcart (Scottish Parliament constituency)
University of St. Andrews (Postgraduate Medical Degrees) Act 2002	Iain Smith	Liberal Democrats	North East Fife
Dog Fouling (Scotland) Act 2003	Keith Harding	Conservative	Edinburgh Pentlands
Council of the Law Society (Scotland) Act 2003	David McLetchie	Conservative	North East Fife (Scottish Parliament constituency)

Title of act/bill	Presented by	Party	Constituency
Breastfeeding etc. (Scotland) Act 2005	Elaine Smith	Labour	Coatbridge and Chryston
St. Andrew's Day Bank Holiday (Scotland) Act 2007	Dennis Canavan	Labour	Cumbernauld and Kilsyth
Christmas Day and New Year's Day Trading (Scotland) Act 2007	Karen Whitefield	Labour	Airdrie and Shotts (constituency)

Title of act/bill	Presented by	Party	Constituency
Scottish Register of Tartans Act 2008	Jamie McGrigor	Conservative	Highlands and Islands (region)
Disabled Persons’ Parking Places (Scotland) Act 2009	Patricia Ferguson	Labour	Glasgow Maryhill
Offences (Aggravation by Prejudice) (Scotland) Act 2009	Patrick Harvie	Greens	Glasgow (region)
Control of Dogs (Scotland) Act 2010	Christine Grahame	SNP	Midlothian South, Tweeddale and Lauderdale
Damages (Scotland) Act 2011	Bill Butler	Labour	Glasgow Anniesland (constituency)
Property Factors (Scotland) Act 2011	Patricia Ferguson	Labour	Glasgow Maryhill
Domestic Abuse (Scotland) Act 2011	Rhoda Grant	Labour	Highlands and Islands (region)

Title of act/bill	Presented by	Party	Constituency
High Hedges (Scotland) Act 2013	Mark McDonald	SNP	Aberdeen Donside (constituency)
Buildings (Recovery of Expenses) (Scotland) Act 2014	David Stewart	Labour	Highlands and Islands (region)
Disabled Persons' Parking Badges (Scotland) Act 2014	Dennis Robertson	Labour	Highlands and Islands (region)
British Sign Language (Scotland) Act 2015	Mark Griffin	Labour	Midlothian South, Tweeddale and Lauderdale
Apologies (Scotland) Act 2016	Margaret Mitchell	Labour	Glasgow Anniesland (constituency)
Smoking Prohibition (Children in Motor Vehicles) (Scotland) Act 2016	Jim Hume	Labour	South Scotland (region)
