= List of acts of the Scottish Parliament from 2026 =

This is a list of acts of the Scottish Parliament passed in 2026. Acts of the Scottish Parliament are enacted by the Scottish Parliament, which has legislative authority over devolved matters in relation to Scotland under the authority of the Scotland Act 1998.

Acts are cited by calendar year, in the same fashion as acts of Parliament of the United Kingdom. Each act passed in a respective year is numbered consecutively with Arabic numerals, following the prefix "asp".

19 acts of the Scottish Parliament have so far been passed in 2026.

indicates that an act has been transcribed on Wikisource, indicates that an act is available to view at legislation.gov.uk, and indicates the location of the original act in the Parliamentary Archives.

== Acts of the Scottish Parliament ==
Short title	Citation	Royal assent
Long title
Non-Domestic Rates (Liability for Unoccupied Properties) (Scotland) Act 2026	2026 asp 1	7 January 2026
An Act of the Scottish Parliament to make provision about the liability of owners of unoccupied properties to pay non-domestic rates.
Dog Theft (Scotland) Act 2026	2026 asp 2	10 February 2026
An Act of the Scottish Parliament to create an offence of dog theft; to provide for a statutory aggravation of that offence; to provide for publication of information relating to that offence; and for connected purposes.
Schools (Residential Outdoor Education) (Scotland) Act 2026	2026 asp 3	11 February 2026
An Act of the Scottish Parliament to make provision about the making available of residential outdoor education to school pupils.
UEFA European Championship (Scotland) Act 2026	2026 asp 4	27 February 2026
An Act of the Scottish Parliament to make provision in relation to the Union of European Football Associations Championship that is to be held, in part, in Glasgow.
Tertiary Education and Training (Funding and Governance) (Scotland) Act 2026	2026 asp 5	11 March 2026
An Act of the Scottish Parliament to make provision about a national funding strategy for tertiary education, skills and apprenticeships; to make provision about the functions and governance of the Scottish Further and Higher Education Funding Council; to make provision about financial support for students in further and higher education; and for connected purposes.
Natural Environment (Scotland) Act 2026	2026 asp 6	12 March 2026
An Act of the Scottish Parliament to make provision about setting targets relating to biodiversity; to make provision in relation to national parks; to make provision in connection with the management of deer; to make certain other miscellaneous provisions relating to environmental matters; and for connected purposes.
Community Wealth Building (Scotland) Act 2026	2026 asp 7	25 March 2026
An Act of the Scottish Parliament to require the Scottish Ministers to prepare and publish a statement about community wealth building; to require local authorities and relevant public bodies to prepare and publish a community wealth building action plan, and to implement that plan; to require certain public bodies to have due regard to community wealth building guidance produced by the Scottish Ministers; and for connected purposes.
Budget (Scotland) Act 2026	2026 asp 8	31 March 2026
An Act of the Scottish Parliament to make provision, for financial year 2026/27, for the use of resources by the Scottish Administration and certain bodies whose expenditure is payable out of the Scottish Consolidated Fund, for the maximum amounts of borrowing by certain statutory bodies and for authorising the payment of sums out of the Fund; to make provision, for financial year 2027/28, for authorising the payment of sums out of the Fund on a temporary basis; and for connected purposes.
Children (Withdrawal from Religious Education and Amendment of UNCRC Compatibility Duty) (Scotland) Act 2026	2026 asp 9	2 April 2026
An Act of the Scottish Parliament to make provision about the involvement of a pupil in a decision to withdraw the pupil from religious observance in schools; and to make provision about circumstances where incompatibility with the requirements of the United Nations Convention on the Rights of the Child (Incorporation) (Scotland) Act 2024 (Note: United Nations Convention on the Rights of the Child (Incorporation) (Scotland) Act 2024 (asp 1)) is not unlawful.
Contract (Formation and Remedies) (Scotland) Act 2026	2026 asp 10	14 April 2026
An Act of the Scottish Parliament to make provision in relation to formation of contract and remedies for breach of contract; and for connected purposes.
European Charter of Local Self-Government (Incorporation) (Scotland) Act 2026	2026 asp 11	15 April 2026
An Act of the Scottish Parliament to incorporate in Scots law the European Charter of Local Self-Government (Note: European Charter of Local Self-Government), and for connected purposes.
Digital Assets (Scotland) Act 2026	2026 asp 12	16 April 2026
An Act of the Scottish Parliament to make provision about the nature of certain digital assets as objects of property in Scots law; and for connected purposes.
Non-surgical Procedures and Functions of Medical Reviewers (Scotland) Act 2026	2026 asp 13	12 May 2026
An Act of the Scottish Parliament to prohibit the provision of non-surgical procedures to persons under the age of 18 or to any person outwith certain specified premises; to confer on the Scottish Ministers power to impose further restrictions and requirements relating to the provision of these procedures; to make provision in relation to certification of death and authorisation of cremation; and for connected purposes.
Building Safety Levy (Scotland) Act 2026	2026 asp 14	13 May 2026
An Act of the Scottish Parliament to make provision imposing a tax (to be known as the Scottish building safety levy) charged in relation to a step in the building control process following the construction of, or conversion works creating, certain new buildings, the proceeds of which are payable to the Scottish Ministers towards meeting any building safety expenditure.
Greyhound Racing (Offences) (Scotland) Act 2026	2026 asp 15	14 May 2026
An Act of the Scottish Parliament to make provision prohibiting the racing of greyhounds on racetracks.
Children (Care, Care Experience and Services Planning) (Scotland) Act 2026	2026 asp 16	15 May 2026
An Act of the Scottish Parliament to make provision for and about the provision of services and support for or in relation to children and other persons with care experience; to make provision for a register of foster carers; to make provision about children’s hearings; to make provision in relation to the planning of children’s services; and for connected purposes.
Crofting and Scottish Land Court Act 2026	2026 asp 17	18 May 2026
An Act of the Scottish Parliament to amend crofting law; to provide for the merger of the Scottish Land Court and the Lands Tribunal for Scotland; and for connected purposes.
Visitor Levy (Amendment) (Scotland) Act 2026	2026 asp 18	21 May 2026
An Act of the Scottish Parliament to amend the Visitor Levy (Scotland) Act 2024 to make further provision about the basis on which the levy is to be charged, chargeable transactions, returns and the operation of Parts 2 and 3 of that Act; and for connected purposes.
Restraint and Seclusion in Schools (Scotland) Act 2026	2026 asp 19	26 May 2026
An Act of the Scottish Parliament to make provision about the restriction of the physical movement of, or isolation of, pupils by education providers in schools.

== See also ==
- List of acts of the Scottish Parliament
