= Victims, Witnesses, and Justice Reform (Scotland) Act 2025 =

Act of the Scottish Parliament

Victims, Witnesses, and Justice Reform (Scotland) Act 2025 (Note: Section 117.)
- Act of the Scottish Parliament
- Scottish Parliament
- Long title: An Act of the Scottish Parliament to establish a Victims and Witnesses Commissioner for Scotland; to make provision for the investigation and prosecution of crime, and the conduct and scheduling of criminal and civil proceedings, to be done in a trauma-informed way; to make provision about the rights of victims to receive information, give views, and be referred to victim support services; to make provision about the release of prisoners; to make provision for special measures for vulnerable witnesses and vulnerable parties in civil proceedings, including the special measure of prohibiting the personal conduct of certain cases; to abolish the not proven verdict and to make provision about the size of juries in criminal trials and the number of jurors needed to deliver guilty verdicts; to establish a new court to try persons accused of certain sexual offences; to make provision about special measures for vulnerable witnesses in certain criminal cases; to provide for anonymity for victims of certain sexual offences; to provide for complainers’ legal representatives to be heard in relation to applications to admit certain evidence in sexual offences cases; to make provision about non-harassment orders; to make provision about the enforcement of protective orders made outwith Scotland; and for connected purposes.
- Citation: 2025 asp 12
- Territorial extent: Scotland

Dates
- Royal assent: 30 October 2025
- Commencement: various (Note: Section 116.)

Other legislation
- Amends: Oaths Act 1978; Criminal Procedure (Scotland) Act 1995

Status: Current legislation

Text of statute as originally enacted

Revised text of statute as amended

Text of the Victims, Witnesses, and Justice Reform (Scotland) Act 2025 as in force today (including any amendments) within the United Kingdom, from legislation.gov.uk.

The Victims, Witnesses, and Justice Reform (Scotland) Act 2025 (asp 12) is an act of the Scottish Parliament. It was introduced in the Scottish Parliament on 25 April 2023, and received royal assent on 30 October 2025.

The legislation includes provisions that abolished the Scots law trial verdict of not proven. It also changed the jury majority required for a conviction from the previous simple majority to at least two-thirds of the 15 jurors.

When the bill for the act was introduced, it provided for a pilot scheme whereby some rape trials would be held without a jury, and to reduce the size of the jury for Scottish criminal trials from 15 to 12. Several Scottish National Party (SNP) MSPs were uncomfortable with these proposals, with six of them abstaining on the vote at stage one. These were: Kate Forbes, Annabelle Ewing, Fergus Ewing, Christine Grahame, Ivan McKee and Michelle Thomson. This meant that at stage one more MSPs abstained on the bill, 62, than voted in favour, 60. These plans were eventually scrapped in October 2024.
