= List of acts of the Scottish Parliament from 2010 =

This is a list of acts of the Scottish Parliament passed in 2010. Acts of the Scottish Parliament are enacted by the Scottish Parliament, which has legislative authority over devolved matters in relation to Scotland under the authority of the Scotland Act 1998. Acts are cited by calendar year, in the same fashion as acts of Parliament of the United Kingdom. Each act passed in a respective year is numbered consecutively with Arabic numerals, following the prefix "asp".

18 acts of the Scottish Parliament were passed in 2010.

indicates that an act has been transcribed on Wikisource, indicates that an act is available to view at legislation.gov.uk, and indicates the location of the original act in the Parliamentary Archives.

== Acts of the Scottish Parliament ==
Short title	Citation	Royal assent
Long title
Arbitration (Scotland) Act 2010	2010 asp 1	5 January 2010
An Act of the Scottish Parliament to make provision about arbitration.
Schools (Consultation) (Scotland) Act 2010	2010 asp 2	5 January 2010
An Act of the Scottish Parliament to make provision for the consultation process that is to apply as respects various proposals made by education authorities for schools; to make special provision for rural schools; to provide for Ministerial call-in of closure proposals; and for connected purposes.
Tobacco and Primary Medical Services (Scotland) Act 2010	2010 asp 3	3 March 2010
An Act of the Scottish Parliament to make provision about the retailing of tobacco products, including provision prohibiting the display of tobacco products and establishing a register of tobacco retailers; to amend the criteria for eligibility to provide primary medical services under the National Health Service (Scotland) Act 1978; (Note: National Health Service (Scotland) Act 1978 (c. 29)) and for connected purposes.
Budget (Scotland) Act 2010	2010 asp 4	10 March 2010
An Act of the Scottish Parliament to make provision, for financial year 2010/11, for the use of resources by the Scottish Administration and certain bodies whose expenditure is payable out of the Scottish Consolidated Fund, for authorising the payment of sums out of the Fund and for the maximum amounts of borrowing by certain statutory bodies; to make provision, for financial year 2011/12, for authorising the payment of sums out of the Fund on a temporary basis; and for connected purposes.
Marine (Scotland) Act 2010	2010 asp 5	10 March 2010
An Act of the Scottish Parliament to make provision in relation to functions and activities in the Scottish marine area, including provision about marine plans, licensing of marine activities, the protection of the area and its wildlife including seals and regulation of sea fisheries; and for connected purposes.
Home Owner and Debtor Protection (Scotland) Act 2010	2010 asp 6	18 March 2010
An Act of the Scottish Parliament to amend the law regarding the enforcement of standard securities over residential property; to amend the Bankruptcy (Scotland) Act 1985 (Note: Bankruptcy (Scotland) Act 1985 (c. 66)) as regards the grounds on which a debtor may apply for sequestration, the types of voluntary trust deed to which the Act applies, the sale or disposal of a debtor's family home and requirements to publish notices about sequestration in the Edinburgh Gazette; and for connected purposes.
Ure Elder Fund Transfer and Dissolution Act 2010	2010 asp 7	9 April 2010
An Act of the Scottish Parliament to transfer the property, rights, interests and liabilities of the Ure Elder Fund for Indigent Widow Ladies to a successor charitable trust; and for connected purposes.
Public Services Reform (Scotland) Act 2010	2010 asp 8	28 April 2010
An Act of the Scottish Parliament to make provision for the purpose of simplifying public bodies, including the transfer and delegation of certain functions, the dissolution of certain bodies and provision in relation to the regulation of officers of court; to enable provision to be made for the purpose of improving the exercise of public functions and for removing and reducing burdens resulting from legislation; to make provision for the publication of information on expenditure and certain other matters by certain public bodies; to establish Creative Scotland with functions in relation to the arts and culture and industries and other activity the focus of which is the application of creative skills; to establish Social Care and Social Work Improvement Scotland with scrutiny functions in relation to care services and social work services; to establish Healthcare Improvement Scotland with scrutiny and other functions in relation to services provided under the National Health Service and independent health care services; to amend the Mental Health (Care and Treatment) (Scotland) Act 2003 (Note: Mental Health (Care and Treatment) (Scotland) Act 2003 (asp 13)) to make provision in relation to the Mental Welfare Commission for Scotland; to make provision about the exercise of scrutiny functions by certain bodies, including provision in respect of the involvement of users of scrutinised services, co-operation and joint inspections; to amend Part 2 of the Public Finance and Accountability (Scotland) Act 2000 (Note: Public Finance and Accountability (Scotland) Act 2000 (asp 1)) in relation to audit authorities and audit reports and examinations under that Part; to amend the Scottish Public Services Ombudsman Act 2002 (Note: Scottish Public Services Ombudsman Act 2002 (asp 11)) to make provision in relation to complaints handling procedures of listed authorities; to amend the Charities and Trustee Investment (Scotland) Act 2005 (Note: Charities and Trustee Investment (Scotland) Act 2005 (asp 10)) in relation to the regulation of charities and charity trustees; and for connected purposes.
Control of Dogs (Scotland) Act 2010	2010 asp 9	26 May 2010
An Act of the Scottish Parliament to make further provision for the control of dogs; to amend the Dangerous Dogs Act 1991; (Note: Dangerous Dogs Act 1991 (c. 65)) and for connected purposes.
Interpretation and Legislative Reform (Scotland) Act 2010	2010 asp 10	3 June 2010
An Act of the Scottish Parliament to make provision about the publication, interpretation and operation of Acts of the Scottish Parliament and instruments made under them; to make provision about the scrutiny of subordinate legislation by the Scottish Parliament; to make provision (including provision for the purposes of section 94(2)(b) of the Scotland Act 1998) (Note: Scotland Act 1998 (c. 46)) about orders subject to special parliamentary procedure; to make provision about the laying of certain documents before the Scottish Parliament; and for connected purposes.
Scottish Parliamentary Commissions and Commissioners etc. Act 2010	2010 asp 11	19 July 2010
An Act of the Scottish Parliament to establish the Commission for Ethical Standards in Public Life in Scotland; to transfer to its members the functions of the Chief Investigating Officer, the Scottish Parliamentary Standards Commissioner and the Commissioner for Public Appointments in Scotland; to make amendments of the Ethical Standards in Public Life etc. (Scotland) Act 2000, (Note: Ethical Standards in Public Life etc. (Scotland) Act 2000 (asp 7)) the Scottish Public Services Ombudsman Act 2002, (Note: Scottish Public Services Ombudsman Act 2002 (asp 11)) the Freedom of Information (Scotland) Act 2002, (Note: Freedom of Information (Scotland) Act 2002 (asp 13)) the Public Appointments and Public Bodies etc. (Scotland) Act 2003, (Note: Public Appointments and Public Bodies etc. (Scotland) Act 2003 (asp 4)) the Commissioner for Children and Young People (Scotland) Act 2003 (Note: Commissioner for Children and Young People (Scotland) Act 2003 (asp 17)) and the Scottish Commission for Human Rights Act 2006, (Note: Scottish Commission for Human Rights Act 2006 (asp 16)) including amendments standardising certain provisions of those Acts and extending and qualifying the functions of the Scottish Public Services Ombudsman; and for connected purposes.
William Simpson's Home (Transfer of Property etc.) (Scotland) Act 2010	2010 asp 12	27 July 2010
An Act of the Scottish Parliament to transfer the property, rights, interests, employees and liabilities of the Trustees of William Simpson's Asylum to a successor company limited by guarantee and to dissolve the Trustees; and for connected purposes.
Criminal Justice and Licensing (Scotland) Act 2010	2010 asp 13	6 August 2010
An Act of the Scottish Parliament to make provision about sentencing, offenders and defaulters; to make provision about criminal law, procedure and evidence; to make provision about criminal justice and the investigation of crime (including police functions); to amend the law relating to the licensing of certain activities by local authorities; to amend the law relating to the sale of alcohol; and for connected purposes.
Crofting Reform (Scotland) Act 2010	2010 asp 14	6 August 2010
An Act of the Scottish Parliament to reform and rename the Crofters Commission; to provide for the establishment of a new register of crofts and for registration of crofts, common grazings and land held runrig in it; to make provision about the duties of crofters and certain owner-occupiers of crofts and for the enforcement of those duties; to make further amendments to the law on crofting; and for connected purposes.
Criminal Procedure (Legal Assistance, Detention and Appeals) (Scotland) Act 2010	2010 asp 15	29 October 2010
An Act of the Scottish Parliament to make provision for persons being questioned by the police on suspicion of having committed an offence to have a right of access to legal assistance; to enable provision to be made for criminal advice and assistance under the Legal Aid (Scotland) Act 1986 (Note: Legal Aid (Scotland) Act 1986 (c. 47)) to be available for such persons in certain circumstances without reference to financial limits; to extend the period during which a person may be detained under section 14 of the Criminal Procedure (Scotland) Act 1995, (Note: Criminal Procedure (Scotland) Act 1995 (c. 46)) and to enable that period to be further extended in certain circumstances; to provide for a right to make representations in relation to applications for extension of time limits for bringing appeals; to provide a time limit for lodging bills of suspension or advocation; to make provision about the grounds for references made to the High Court by the Scottish Criminal Cases Review Commission and to confer power on the High Court to reject such references in certain circumstances; and for connected purposes.
Legal Services (Scotland) Act 2010	2010 asp 16	9 November 2010
An Act of the Scottish Parliament to allow and to make provision for regulating the supply of certain legal services by licensed entities; to extend rights to obtain confirmation to the estates of deceased persons; to regulate will and other testamentary writing by non-lawyers; to make provision concerning the Law Society of Scotland and the Faculty of Advocates and for the professional arrangements to which solicitors and advocates are subject; to allow court rules to permit the making of oral submissions by lay representatives in civil cases; and for connected purposes.
Housing (Scotland) Act 2010	2010 asp 17	9 December 2010
An Act of the Scottish Parliament to establish the Scottish Housing Regulator and to make provision about housing, including provision about the performance and regulation of social landlords and reforms of the right to buy social housing; and for connected purposes.
Alcohol etc. (Scotland) Act 2010	2010 asp 18	15 December 2010
An Act of the Scottish Parliament to make provision regulating the sale of alcohol and licensing of premises on which alcohol is sold and to make provision for the imposition of charges on holders of licences granted under the Licensing (Scotland) Act 2005 (Note: Licensing (Scotland) Act 2005 (asp 16)) and the Civic Government (Scotland) Act 1982. (Note: Civic Government (Scotland) Act 1982 (c. 45))

== See also ==
- List of acts of the Scottish Parliament
