= List of acts of the Scottish Parliament from 2015 =

This is a list of acts of the Scottish Parliament passed in 2015. Acts of the Scottish Parliament are enacted by the Scottish Parliament, which has legislative authority over devolved matters in relation to Scotland under the authority of the Scotland Act 1998. Acts are cited by calendar year, in the same fashion as acts of Parliament of the United Kingdom. Each act passed in a respective year is numbered consecutively with Arabic numerals, following the prefix "asp".

13 acts of the Scottish Parliament were passed in 2015.

indicates that an act has been transcribed on Wikisource, indicates that an act is available to view at legislation.gov.uk, and indicates the location of the original act in the Parliamentary Archives.

== Acts of the Scottish Parliament ==
Short title	Citation	Royal assent
Long title
Food (Scotland) Act 2015	2015 asp 1	13 January 2015
An Act of the Scottish Parliament to establish Food Standards Scotland and make provision as to its functions; to amend the law in relation to food; to enable provision to be made in relation to animal feeding stuffs; to make provision for administrative sanctions in relation to offences under the law in relation to food; and for connected purposes.
Budget (Scotland) Act 2015	2015 asp 2	11 March 2015
An Act of the Scottish Parliament to make provision, for financial year 2015/16, for the use of resources by the Scottish Administration and certain bodies whose expenditure is payable out of the Scottish Consolidated Fund, for the maximum amounts of borrowing by certain statutory bodies and for authorising the payment of sums out of the Fund; to make provision, for financial year 2016/17, for authorising the payment of sums out of the Fund on a temporary basis; and for connected purposes.
Community Charge Debt (Scotland) Act 2015	2015 asp 3	25 March 2015
An Act of the Scottish Parliament to extinguish various liabilities arising by virtue of the Abolition of Domestic Rates Etc. (Scotland) Act 1987. (Note: Abolition of Domestic Rates Etc. (Scotland) Act 1987 (c. 47))
Legal Writings (Counterparts and Delivery) (Scotland) Act 2015	2015 asp 4	1 April 2015
An Act of the Scottish Parliament to make provision about execution of documents in counterpart and the delivery by electronic means of traditional documents; and for connected purposes.
Welfare Funds (Scotland) Act 2015	2015 asp 5	8 April 2015
An Act of the Scottish Parliament to make provision about the maintenance of welfare funds and to provide for them to be used to help certain individuals; and for connected purposes.
Community Empowerment (Scotland) Act 2015	2015 asp 6	24 July 2015
An Act of the Scottish Parliament to make provision about national outcomes; to confer functions on certain persons in relation to services provided by, and assets of, certain public bodies; to amend Parts 2 and 3 of the Land Reform (Scotland) Act 2003; (Note: Land Reform (Scotland) Act 2003 (asp 2)) to enable certain bodies to buy abandoned, neglected or detrimental land; to amend section 7C of the Forestry Act 1967; (Note: Forestry Act 1967 (c. 10)) to enable the Scottish Ministers to make provision about supporters' involvement in and ownership of football clubs; to make provision for registers of common good property and about disposal and use of such property; to restate and amend the law on allotments; to enable participation in decision-making by specified persons having public functions; to enable local authorities to reduce or remit non-domestic rates; and for connected purposes.
Scottish Elections (Reduction of Voting Age) Act 2015	2015 asp 7	24 July 2015
An Act of the Scottish Parliament to reduce the voting age to 16 at elections for membership of the Scottish Parliament and local government elections; and for connected purposes.
Prisoners (Control of Release) (Scotland) Act 2015	2015 asp 8	4 August 2015
An Act of the Scottish Parliament to amend the rules as to automatic early release of long-term prisoners from prison on licence and to allow prisoners serving all but very short sentences to be released from prison on a particular day suitable for their re-integration into the community.
Mental Health (Scotland) Act 2015	2015 asp 9	4 August 2015
An Act of the Scottish Parliament to amend the Mental Health (Care and Treatment) (Scotland) Act 2003 (Note: Mental Health (Care and Treatment) (Scotland) Act 2003 (asp 13)) in various respects; to make provision about mental health disposals in criminal cases; to make provision as to the rights of victims of crime committed by mentally-disordered persons; and for connected purposes.
Air Weapons and Licensing (Scotland) Act 2015	2015 asp 10	4 August 2015
An Act of the Scottish Parliament to make provision for the licensing and regulation of air weapons; to amend the Licensing (Scotland) Act 2005; (Note: Licensing (Scotland) Act 2005 (asp 16)) to amend and extend the licensing provisions of the Civic Government (Scotland) Act 1982; (Note: Civic Government (Scotland) Act 1982 (c. 45)) and for connected purposes.
British Sign Language (Scotland) Act 2015	2015 asp 11	22 October 2015
An Act of the Scottish Parliament to promote the use of British Sign Language including by making provision for the preparation and publication of national plans in relation to British Sign Language and by requiring certain authorities to prepare and publish their own British Sign Language plans in connection with the exercise of their functions; and to provide for the manner in which such plans are to be prepared and for their review and updating.
Human Trafficking and Exploitation (Scotland) Act 2015	2015 asp 12	4 November 2015
An Act of the Scottish Parliament to make provision about human trafficking and slavery, servitude and forced or compulsory labour, including provision about offences and sentencing, provision for victim support and provision to reduce activity related to offences.
Harbours (Scotland) Act 2015	2015 asp 13	2 December 2015
An Act of the Scottish Parliament to repeal sections 10 to 12 of the Ports Act 1991 (Note: Ports Act 1991 (c. 52)) and amend Schedules 3 and 4 to the Harbours Act 1964. (Note: Harbours Act 1964 (c. 40))

== See also ==
- List of acts of the Scottish Parliament
