= Scottish Languages Act 2025 =

Act of the Scottish Parliament

Scottish Languages Act 2025 (Note: Section 49.)
- Act of the Scottish Parliament
- Scottish Parliament
- Long title: An Act of the Scottish Parliament to make provision about support for the Gaelic and Scots languages; to make provision about education in relation to Gaelic and Scots; and for connected purposes.
- Citation: 2025 asp 10
- Introduced by: Jenny Gilruth MSP
- Territorial extent: Scotland

Dates
- Royal assent: 31 July 2025
- Commencement: 1 August 2025 (part 3); various; (Note: Section 48.)

Other legislation
- Amends: Education (Scotland) Act 1980

Status: Current legislation

Text of statute as originally enacted

Revised text of statute as amended

Text of the Scottish Languages Act 2025 as in force today (including any amendments) within the United Kingdom, from legislation.gov.uk.

The Scottish Languages Act 2025 (asp 10) is an act of the Scottish Parliament which seeks to recognise and promote Scots and Scottish Gaelic within Scotland.

The Scottish Parliament passed the act on 17 June 2025 with the support of every party represented in the parliament. 112 MSPs voted in favour, with no members voting against.

Following the entry into force of the act, Scots and Scottish Gaelic are now the two official languages of Scotland, while English is the most spoken language and British Sign Language is a recognised language.
