= List of acts of the Scottish Parliament from 2017 =

This is a list of acts of the Scottish Parliament passed in 2017. Acts of the Scottish Parliament are enacted by the Scottish Parliament, which has legislative authority over devolved matters in relation to Scotland under the authority of the Scotland Act 1998. Acts are cited by calendar year, in the same fashion as acts of Parliament of the United Kingdom. Each act passed in a respective year is numbered consecutively with Arabic numerals, following the prefix "asp".

7 acts of the Scottish Parliament were passed in 2017.

indicates that an act is available to view at legislation.gov.uk, and indicates the location of the original act in the Parliamentary Archives.

== Acts of the Scottish Parliament ==
{{legislationuk|act |- | {{|Budget (Scotland) Act 2017|asp|1|31-03-2017|maintained=y|archived=n|An Act of the Scottish Parliament to make provision, for financial year 2017/18, for the use of resources by the Scottish Administration and certain bodies whose expenditure is payable out of the Scottish Consolidated Fund, for the maximum amounts of borrowing by certain statutory bodies and for authorising the payment of sums out of the Fund; to make provision, for financial year 2018/19, for authorising the payment of sums out of the Fund on a temporary basis; and for connected purposes.}} |- | {{|Air Departure Tax (Scotland) Act 2017|asp|2|25-07-2017|maintained=y|archived=n|An Act of the Scottish Parliament to make provision for a tax on the carriage of passengers by air from airports in Scotland.}} |- | {{|Limitation (Childhood Abuse) (Scotland) Act 2017|asp|3|28-07-2017|maintained=y|archived=n|An Act of the Scottish Parliament to remove the limitation period for actions of damages in respect of personal injuries resulting from childhood abuse.}} |- | {{|Railway Policing (Scotland) Act 2017|asp|4|01-08-2017|maintained=y|archived=n|An Act of the Scottish Parliament to make provision about the arrangements for the Police Service of Scotland to police railways and railway property; and for connected purposes.}} |- | {{|Contract (Third Party Rights) (Scotland) Act 2017|asp|5|30-10-2017|maintained=y|archived=n|An Act of the Scottish Parliament to make provision about the enforcement of contractual terms by third parties.}} |- | {{|Child Poverty (Scotland) Act 2017|asp|6|18-12-2017|maintained=y|archived=n|An Act of the Scottish Parliament to set targets relating to the eradication of child poverty; to make provision about plans and reports relating to the targets; and to establish the Poverty and Inequality Commission and provide for its functions.}} |- | {{|Seat Belts on School Transport (Scotland) Act 2017|asp|7|18-12-2017|maintained=y|archived=n|An Act of the Scottish Parliament to require that motor vehicles provided for the dedicated transport of pupils are fitted with seat belts.}} }}

== See also ==
- List of acts of the Scottish Parliament
