= British Sign Language (Scotland) Act 2015 =

- Act of the Scottish Parliament
- Scottish Parliament
- Long title: An Act of the Scottish Parliament to promote the use of British Sign Language including by making provision for the preparation and publication of national plans in relation to British Sign Language and by requiring certain authorities to prepare and publish their own British Sign Language plans in connection with the exercise of their functions; and to provide for the manner in which such plans are to be prepared and for their review and updating.
- Citation: 2015 asp 11
- Introduced by: Mark Griffin
- Territorial extent: Scotland

Dates
- Royal assent: 22 October 2015

Status: Current legislation

Text of statute as originally enacted

Text of the British Sign Language (Scotland) Act 2015 as in force today (including any amendments) within the United Kingdom, from legislation.gov.uk.

The British Sign Language Act 2015 (asp 11) is an act of the Scottish Parliament, which legally recognises British Sign Language (BSL) as a language of Scotland. It also requires the Scottish ministers to develop a "National Plan", the first of which was published on 24 October 2017.

== Passage ==
The British Sign Language (Scotland) Bill was introduced to the Scottish Parliament as a private members' bill on 29 October 2014 by Mark Griffin. The bill gained cross-party and Government support before passing its second and third reading in the Scottish Parliament without any difficulties. It received royal assent on 22 October 2015.

== Legal effect ==
The act legally recognises British Sign Language as a language of Scotland, a similar status to Scottish Gaelic. It requires the government and local councils to publish national plans on how the language is used in its public communications and issue guidance on promoting its usage.

== See also ==
- British Sign Language Act 2022
