= Patient Safety Commissioner for Scotland =

- Flag of Scotland
- Reports to: Scottish Parliament
- Nominator: Scottish Parliament
- Appointer: Monarch of the United Kingdom on the nomination of the Scottish Parliament
- Term length: 8 years
- Constituting instrument: Patient Safety Commissioner for Scotland Act 2023

The Patient Safety Commissioner for Scotland is a public office to provide scrutiny of care that is independent of both government and the health service.

The commissioner will "advocate for systemic improvement in the safety of health care, including forensic medical examinations, in Scotland and promote the importance of the views of patients and other members of the public in relation to the safety of health care".

They have a remit that covers all health care providers operating in Scotland including the NHS, NHS contracted and independent healthcare providers.

The commissioner will be responsible formal investigations being conducted where there are concerns and safety issues are possible, making use of patients and members of the public. The commissioner has been given the authority to require people to provide information.

== History ==
Patient Safety Commissioner for Scotland Act 2023 (Note: Section 25.)
- Act of the Scottish Parliament
- Scottish Parliament
- Long title: An Act of the Scottish Parliament to provide for the establishment and functions of a Patient Safety Commissioner for Scotland.
- Citation: 2023 asp 6
- Territorial extent: Scotland

Dates
- Royal assent: 7 November 2023
- Commencement: various (Note: Section 24.)Patient Safety Commissioner for Scotland Act 2023

Other legislation
- Amends: Scottish Public Services Ombudsman Act 2002

Status: Amended

Text of statute as originally enacted

Revised text of statute as amended

Text of the Patient Safety Commissioner for Scotland Act 2023 as in force today (including any amendments) within the United Kingdom, from legislation.gov.uk.

An independent review by Baroness Cumberlege into harm sustained by patients reported in July 2020, with recommendations directed towards the healthcare system in England. In September 2020, the programme of government in Scotland set out a commitment to creating the role of a national advocate for patients. On 27 September 2023 the Members of the Scottish Parliament voted unanimously to pass the bill, which became the Patient Safety Commissioner for Scotland Act 2023 (asp 6).

The successful candidate will be appointed by His Majesty on the nomination of the Scottish Parliament. The annual cost to staff and run this office is anticipated to be around £645,000. In April 2024 candidates were interviewed by a cross-party panel, but the panel had decided not to nominate any of those applicants, instead preferring to readvertise. A second, full recruitment exercise took place but the preferred candidate did not take up the offer. In February 2025, the position was advertised for a third time.

In May 2025, Karen Titchener was nominated for the role by the Scottish Parliament. She started in September 2025.

== See also ==
- Patient Safety Commissioner (England)
- Llais (Wales)
- Patient and Client Council (Northern Ireland)
