= New Zealand Sign Language Act 2006 =

Act of Parliament in New Zealand

New Zealand Parliament
- Enacted by: House of Representatives
- Royal assent: 10 April 2006
- Commenced: 10 April 2006

Legislative history
- Introduced by: Hon. Ruth Dyson
- Introduced: 7 April 2004
- First reading: 22 June 2004
- Second reading: 23 February 2006
- Third reading: 6 April 2006

Summary
- Recognising New Zealand Sign Language (NZSL) as New Zealand's third official language
- Status: In force

The New Zealand Sign Language Act 2006 is an act of the New Zealand Parliament recognising New Zealand Sign Language (NZSL) as New Zealand's third official language.

== Background ==
Historically, NZSL users have been subject to social deprivation due to the lack of recognition

In April 2006, the New Zealand Government announced that New Zealand Sign Language would become New Zealand's third official language following English and Maori, which would allow the ability to use and access NZSL in legal proceedings, including in court.

== Impact ==
Five years after the bill passed, many public services were still inaccessible in NZSL.

Recognising NZSL as an official language of New Zealand, Air New Zealand released updates to its in-flight videos making them accessible in NZSL.

== Further developments ==
In 2015, the NZSL Board was set up to give practical effect to the legislation.

In 2022, the government held a consultation on amendments to the act.

== See also ==
- British Sign Language Act 2022
- Accessible Canada Act
- Irish Sign Language Act 2017
