= Llais (Wales) =

Citizen voice body for healthcare and social care in Wales

Non-departmental public body overview
- Formed: 1 April 2022
- Jurisdiction: Wales
- Motto: Your voice in health and social care (Welsh: Eich llais mewn iechyd a gofal cymdeithasol)
- Employees: 100
- Non-departmental public body executive: Alyson Thomas, Chief Executive
- Key document: Health and Social Care (Quality and Engagement) (Wales) Act
- Website: https://www.llaiswales.org/

Llais is a non-departmental public body of the Welsh Government. It was first established in 2022 as part of the Health and Social Care (Quality and Engagement) (Wales) Act 2020 to promote patients' interests to the NHS Wales and social care in Wales.

In 2023, the Welsh Government was criticised for not establishing a patient safety commissioner as had been the case in England and Scotland: the Patient Safety Commissioner and the Patient Safety Commissioner for Scotland - the Welsh Government responded by pointing out that Llais had just been established creating such a similar body would create confusion.

== See also ==
- Patient and Client Council (Northern Ireland)
- Patient Safety Commissioner for Scotland
- Patient Safety Commissioner for England
