= Smoking in the United Kingdom =

View chart definition.

Smoking in the United Kingdom involves the consumption of combustible cigarettes and other forms of tobacco in the United Kingdom, as well as the history of the tobacco industry, together with government regulation and medical issues.

Smoking is legally permitted, with certain conditions set from laws enacted separately in England, Wales, Scotland and Northern Ireland. It is illegal to smoke tobacco in enclosed public places, such as restaurants, shops or pubs, under the Health Act 2006 for England and Wales, the Smoking (Northern Ireland) Order 2006 for Northern Ireland and the Smoking, Health and Social Care (Scotland) Act 2005 for Scotland. In England and Wales, it is also illegal to smoke in a car if one is transporting people under 18 or if a vehicle is being used for work purposes. Smoking is prevalent among a sizeable, but continuously reducing minority of the population. It has been argued that smoking puts considerable strain upon the National Health Service (NHS) due to the health problems which can be directly linked with smoking, though early deaths from smoking relieve the NHS from caring for long-term debilities. Successive UK Governments have endeavoured to reduce the prevalence of smoking. As part of this commitment, the NHS currently offers free help to smokers who want to quit.

In April 2026, the House of Commons and House of Lords passed the Tobacco and Vapes Act 2026 which imposes a lifelong ban on the purchase of cigarettes and vapes for anyone born after 1 January 2009. The law gives ministers additional powers for the regulation of tobacco, vaping and nicotine products and a ban for vaping in cars carrying children, in playgrounds, outside schools and at hospitals. The law is intended to "create a smoke-free generation". The law also restricts advertising and promotion of nicotine products to children.

== History ==
=== 19th and early 20th centuries ===
==== House of Carreras ====
The House of Carreras began trading in 1788 under a Spanish nobleman, Don José Carreras Ferrer, who fought with the Wellington in the Peninsular War. Carreras began trading in London at a time when cigars were increasing in popularity and Don José became a pioneer in his field. However, although the business prospered it did not become a major concern until his son Don José Joaquin Carreras began to specialise in the blending of tobaccos and snuff. The company produced blends to suit the individual tastes of the highest members of society, with customers visiting his showrooms to select their own tobaccos. Some of Don José's tobacco brands became world-famous, including Guards' Mixture and Hankey's Mixture. Over one thousand brands of cigar could be bought from Carreras, together with snuffs, cigarettes, and pipes.

The business remained in the hands of the Carreras family until 1894, when Mr. W J Yapp, a well-known figure in the shoe leather industry, took control. The House of Carreras became a London landmark, and it was here that Prince Albert Edward (later Edward VII) often came to select the finest cigars.

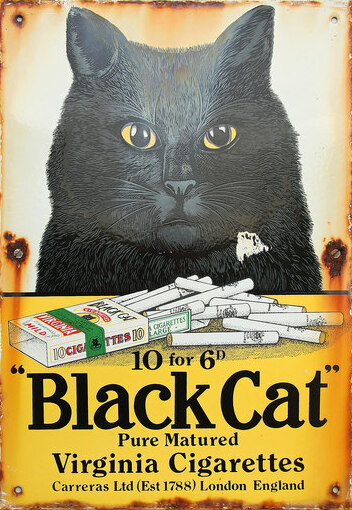
Adverisment for Black Cat Cigarettes from the early 20th century

To enter the cigarette market Carreras need high speed machine like the Bonsack machine, on which Wills had a monopoly. The opportunity came from Bernhard Baron, who had rights to a rival American machine. In June 1903, Carreras became a public company with Barton in charge. Its cigarettes now competed with the Imperial Tobacco Group as well as American Tobacco Company. In 1904, an allied cigarette company was established, Carreras and Marcianus Ltd. It introduced three new brands including Black Cat, the first cigarette in Britain to contain coupons that were redeemable for gifts. In 1905 yet more brands were introduced such as Chick, Jetty, and Sweet Kiss. Sales were good and in 1906 it added new brands such as Carreras Ovals and Seven Up.

Baron chose many novel schemes for the promotion of Carreras' pipe tobacco and cigarette brands. In 1909, the company introduced the Baron automatic pipe filler in cartridges, which revolutionised pipe smoking and sold by the millions. Other brands were introduced before the First World War including Fireball, Golden Clipper, Red Route Mixture, and Life Ray. The 1914-18 war caused a rapid acceleration in cigarette smoking and Carreras was to the fore in supplying cigarettes to the armed forces.

==== Wills company ====
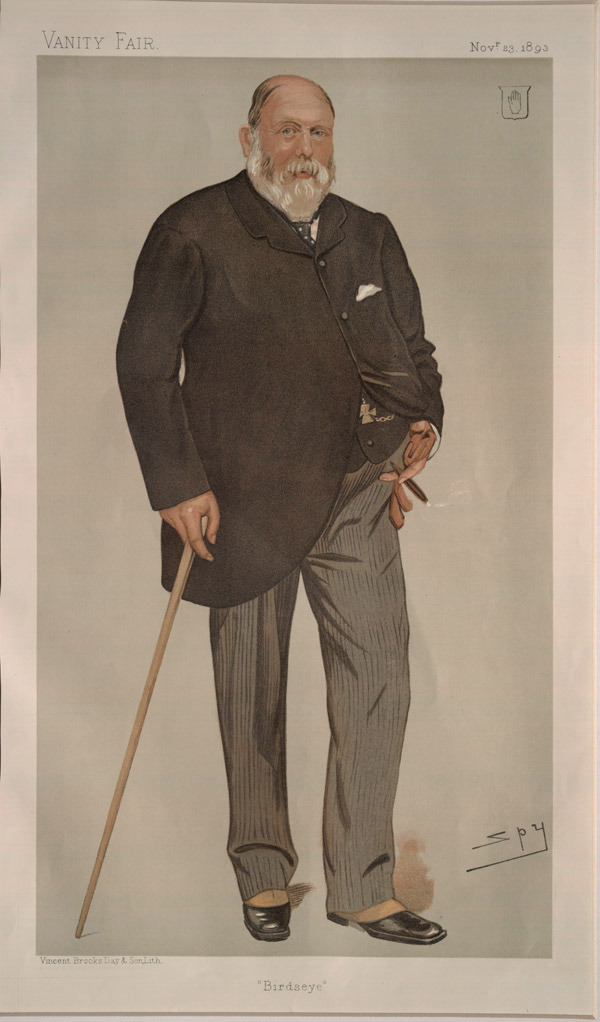
"Birdseye". Caricature of William Wills, by Spy published in Vanity Fair in 1893. He made a fortune from cigarettes, but smoked a cigar.

According to B.W.E. Alford, in the first century after its founding in Bristol in 1786, Wills was one of many small firms processing loose tobacco for the competitive British market. It bested the competition by maintaining the quality of the pipe tobaccos and reliance on effective salesmanship. Their well-paid salesmen provided valuable feedback about consumer preferences and promotional tactics, like using cards featuring famous English personalities. Wills gained market share by introducing branded tobaccos and began pre-packaging their products, which allowed for wider distribution through regular retail shops rather than just specialised outlets. In 1883, Wills acquired the exclusive British rights to the powerful Bonsack cigarette manufacturing machine. Cigarettes now became very cheap to make in large quantities. The less expensive Woodbine cigarette brand became a marketing sensation starting in 1888. Ignoring initial doubts about the market potential of cigarettes compared to pipe tobacco, Wills saw sales increase leaving the small competitors far behind in the new cigarette market. In 1901, Wills faced strong competition from Duke's American Tobacco Company. Duke entered the English market with an alliance with Ogden's and a heavily advertised brand, "Guinea Gold," the first Virginia cigarette made in England. Wills strategically merged with the other British rivals to secure its dominance in the British market. Wills contributed 58% of the £12 million pounds capital of Imperial Tobacco, with the rest coming from 12 competitors. Wills easily dominated the new company and by the strong leadership of William Wills, 1st Baron Winterstoke it successfully defended their market share from American threats.

==== John Player & Sons ====
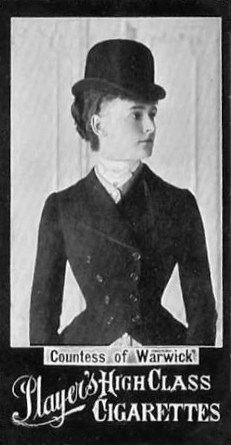
Daisy Greville featured on a Player's card, c. 1890

In March 1820, William Wright set up a small tobacco factory in Craigshill, Livingston, West Lothian. This business expanded and earned Wright a comfortable fortune. John Player bought the business in 1877. He had the Castle Tobacco Factories built in Radford, Nottingham, just west of the city centre. They filled three large blocks. The business became a private limited company in 1895, with a share capital of £200,000. The business was later run by Player's sons John Dane Player and William Goodacre Player. In 1901, in response to competitive threats from the American Tobacco Company, Player's merged with the new Imperial Tobacco Company.

W.D. & H.O. Wills in 1887 was one of the first companies to include advertising cards with their cigarettes, but it was John Player & Sons in 1893 that produced one of the first general interest sets 'Castles and Abbeys'.

=== Imperial Tobacco Company ===
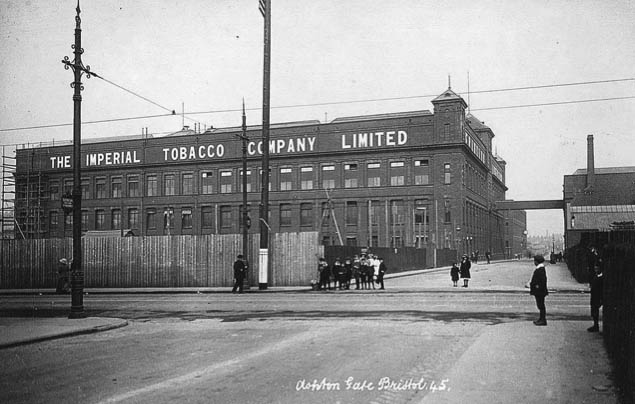
Imperial Tobacco building in Raleigh Road, Bristol, constructed in 1912

The Imperial Tobacco Company was created in 1901, through the amalgamation of 13 British tobacco and cigarette companies: WD & HO Wills of Bristol (the leading manufacturer of tobacco products at that time), John Player & Sons of Nottingham, and 11 other independent family businesses, which were in competition with companies from the United States by the American Tobacco Company. First WD & HO Wills of Bristol merged with Stephen Mitchell & Son of Glasgow. Subsequently, other smaller companies including Lambert & Butler, William Clarke & Son, Franklyn Davey, Edwards Ringer & Bigg, Hignett Brothers, Hignett's Tobacco, Adkins & Sons, Richmond Cavendish, D&J MacDoland and F&J Smith joined in the amalgamation. In 1904, James & Finlay Bell Ltd merged with Stephen Mitchell & Son. The Company's first chairman was William Henry Wills of the Wills Company.

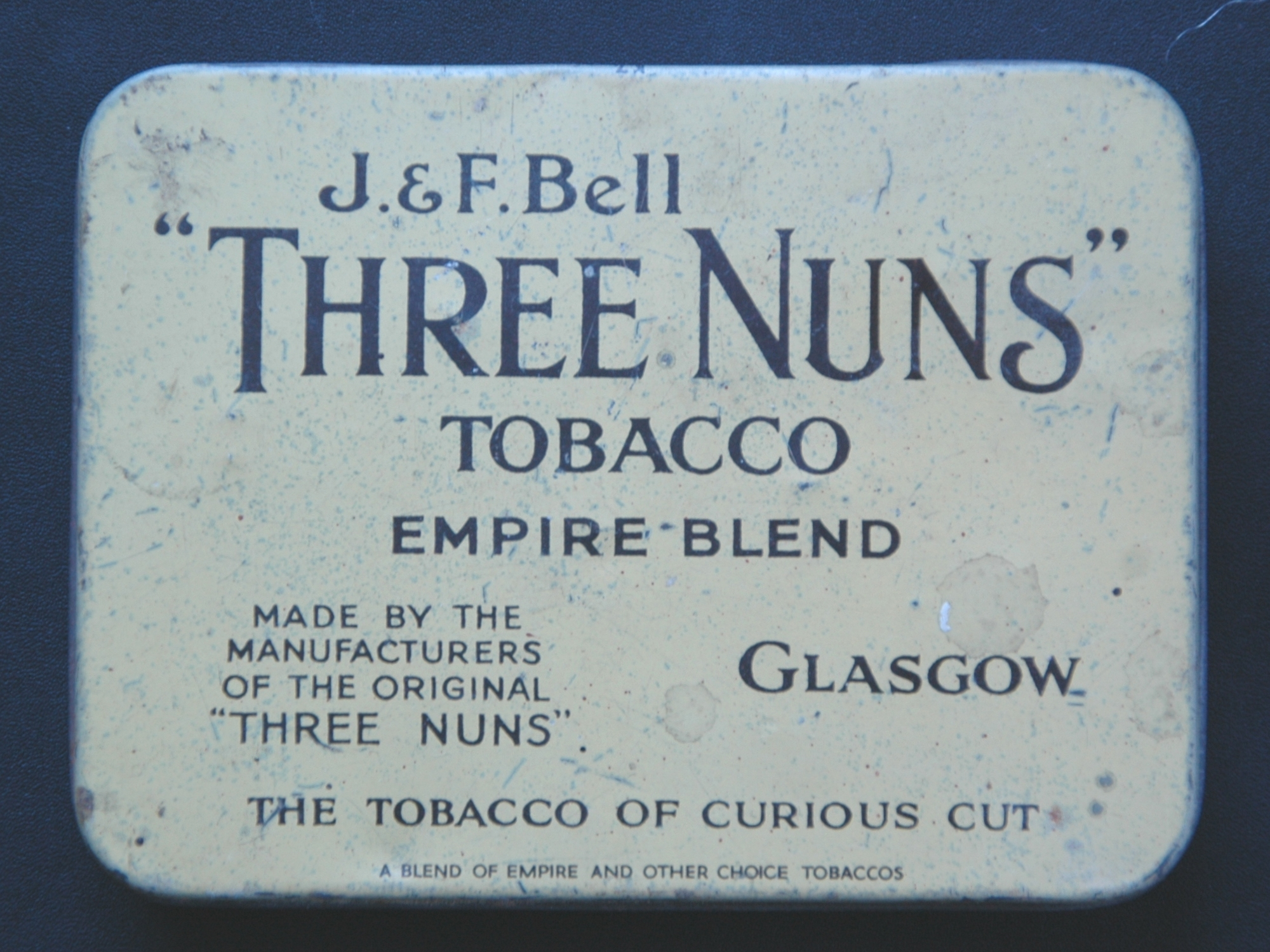
A 2-ounce (57 g) tin for J&F Bell "Three Nuns" tobacco

In 1902, the Imperial Tobacco Company and the American Tobacco Company agreed to form a joint venture: the British American Tobacco. The parent companies agreed not to trade in each other's domestic territory and to assign trademarks, export businesses, and overseas subsidiaries to the joint venture. It built the Imperial Tobacco Company Building at Mullins, South Carolina, US between 1908, and 1913. It also established its own leaf-buying organisation in the United States through its building, the Imperial Tobacco Warehouse, in Durham, North Carolina.

American Tobacco sold its share of Imperial in 1911. Imperial maintained an interest in British American Tobacco until 1980.

=== British Empire and Commonwealth ===
==== India ====
Smoking in India is one of the oldest industries and provides livelihood to more than five million people directly and indirectly. India is the second-largest producer of tobacco in the world. Tobacco was introduced to India in the 17th century. It later merged with existing practices of smoking (mostly of cannabis). In 1910, Imperial Tobacco formed the Imperial Tobacco Company of India (ITC Ltd.) The second largest player is Godfrey Phillips India formed in 1936.

==== Egypt ====
According to historian Relli Shechter, in the late 19th century, the cigarette emerged as a fashionable way to consume tobacco and gained popularity not only in Egypt but also globally and within the Ottoman Empire. Under British control 1882–1922, cigarettes became the preferred smoking choice in Egypt, with luxury Egyptian brands being exported worldwide. The Egyptian cigarette industry became a significant export sector, influencing global trends, and was notable for being one of the earliest non-Western producers of internationally traded manufactured goods. This industrial growth was surprising as Egypt primarily focused on exporting raw materials and importing finished goods until then. Despite facing challenges such as poor-quality Egyptian-grown tobacco and a tobacco cultivation ban in 1890, the Egyptian cigarette industry thrived and became renowned in the region. Cigarettes made from Eastern tobacco were exported worldwide, solidifying Egypt's position as a key player in the world of tobacco production and trade.

=== Since 1973 ===
In 1973, the Imperial Tobacco Company, having become increasingly diversified by acquisition of (amongst others) restaurant chains, food services and distribution businesses, changed its name to Imperial Group while tobacco products continued to be sold by a newly formed subsidiary named Imperial Tobacco Limited.

In 1986, the company was acquired by the conglomerate Hanson Trust plc for £2.5 billion. In 1996, following a decision to concentrate on core tobacco activities, Hanson de-merged Imperial and it was listed as an independent company on the UK stock exchange.

=== British-American Tobacco ===
British-American Tobacco was formed in 1902, when Imperial Tobacco Company and American Tobacco Company agreed to form a joint venture, the "British-American Tobacco Company Ltd." The parent companies agreed not to trade in each other's domestic territory and to assign trademarks, export businesses and overseas subsidiaries to the joint venture. James Buchanan Duke became company chairman supported by Hugo Cunliffe-Owen (later Chairman) and Albert Jeffress (later Deputy Chairman); then business was begun in countries as diverse as Canada, China, Germany, South Africa, New Zealand and Australia. It is based in London but originally did not sell to consumers in the United Kingdom or in the United States.

== Prevalence ==
UK whole statistics regionally

Current smokers

Ex-smokers

Never smoked

In 1962, over 70% of British men and 40% of British women smoked. As recently as 1974, 45% of the British population smoked. This was down to 30% by the early 1990s, 21% by 2010, and 19.3% by 2013, the lowest level recorded for eighty years. An annual No Smoking Day has occurred in March since 1984.

In 2015, it was reported smoking rates in England had fallen to 16.9%, a record low. In 2018, the UK smoking rate had fallen to 14.4%. 25–34 year olds had the highest smoking rate, with approximately 1 in 5 people within this age range (around 1.4 million adults) being smokers.

In 2019, one in five Scottish people — 850,000 adults — identified as smokers. Approximately 28% of men and 25% of women in Scotland smoked regularly in 2018, a rate higher than that of the United Kingdom as a whole.

Intentions of cigarette smokers on quitting over time in Great Britain

Smoking prevalence varies with geography. In self-reported Annual Population Survey data, the local authorities of Kingston upon Hull and Blackpool had consistently high smoking prevalence rates of 22.2% and 23.4% respectively in 2019, while Ribble Valley and Rushcliffe had rates of 5.1% and 5.9%. It is estimated that in some of the most deprived communities in Scotland, smoking rates may be as high as 47%. An estimated 40% of adults smoke in the constituency of Glasgow East, one of the most deprived seats in the entire United Kingdom.

Smoking graphs

== Health issues ==
It has been estimated by Cancer Research UK that smoking is the single greatest cause of preventable illness and early death, with around 107,000 people dying in 2007 from smoking-related diseases, including cancers, in the UK. Around 86% of lung cancer deaths in the UK are caused by tobacco smoking; overall tobacco smoking is estimated to be responsible for more than a quarter of cancer deaths in the UK, around 43,000 deaths in 2007.

The British Medical Journal states that due to the drive to help smokers quit smoking, Britain has the world's largest reduction in the number of deaths from lung cancer. In 1950, the UK had one of the highest rates in the world. The annual number of deaths from lung cancer in 2000 was half of what it was in 1965.

Reducing the prevalence of smoking to 5% could avoid nearly 100,000 new cases of smoking-related disease including 35,900 cancers over twenty years and save £67,000,000 a year in health- and social-care costs, according to research commissioned by Cancer Research UK.

== Age restrictions ==
=== United Kingdom ===
In April 2026, Parliament passed the Tobacco and Vapes Act 2026, which bans the sale of tobacco to "anyone born on or after 1 January 2009." (This legislation does not come into effect until January 2027).

=== England and Wales ===
In England and Wales, the general smoking age is set at 16, while the purchase age is 18.

From 1908 until 2007, the purchase age was aligned with the minimum age to consume such products, at 16 years of age. From 1 October 2007, the Children and Young Persons (Sale of Tobacco etc.) Order 2007 became effective, raising the minimum purchase age to 18 years of age.

=== Scotland ===
Until 30 September 2007, the minimum age to purchase and consume tobacco products in public was 16 years of age. From 30 September 2007, the Tobacco and Primary Medical Services (Scotland) Act 2010 became effective, raising the minimum purchase, consumption, and possession age to 18 years of age.

Section 4: Sale of tobacco products to persons under 18
(1) A person who sells a tobacco product or cigarette papers to a person under the age of 18 commits an offence.

Section 5: Purchase of tobacco products by persons under 18
(1) A person under the age of 18 who buys or attempts to buy a tobacco product or cigarette papers commits an offence.
Section 6: Purchase of tobacco products on behalf of persons under 18

(1) A person aged 18 or over who knowingly buys or attempts to buy a tobacco product or cigarette papers on behalf of a person under the age of 18 commits an offence.

— Tobacco and Primary Medical Services (Scotland) Act 2010, Chapter 1 – Sale and purchase of tobacco products

Section 7: Confiscation of tobacco products from persons under 18

(1) Where a constable has reasonable grounds for suspecting that a person in a public place—

(a) is under the age of 18, and
(b) is in possession of a tobacco product or cigarette papers,

the constable may require the person to surrender the tobacco product or, as the case may be, the cigarette papers to the constable.
(7) The constable may dispose of any tobacco product or cigarette papers surrendered to the constable in such manner as the constable considers appropriate. (8) In this section "public place" includes—

(a) any place to which the public have access for the time being (whether on payment of a fee or otherwise), and
(b) any place to which the public doesn't have access but to which the person mentioned in subsection (1) has unlawfully gained access.

— Tobacco and Primary Medical Services (Scotland) Act 2010, Chapter 1 – Miscellaneous

=== Northern Ireland ===
Until 31 August 2008, the minimum age to purchase and consume tobacco products in public was 16 years of age. From 1 September 2008 the Children and Young Persons (Sale of Tobacco etc.) Regulations (Northern Ireland) 2008 became effective, raising the minimum purchase, consumption and possession age to 18 years of age.

Section 3: Prohibition on sale of tobacco, etc. to persons apparently under 18
(1) Subject to paragraph (2), a person who sells to a person under the age of 18 any tobacco or cigarette papers, whether for his own use or not, shall be guilty of an offence.

Section 5: Seizure of tobacco, etc. in possession of persons apparently under 18
(1) A member of the Police Service of Northern Ireland may seize any tobacco or cigarette papers in the possession of any person apparently under the age of 18 whom he finds smoking in any street or public place.

(2) Any tobacco or cigarette papers seized under paragraph (1) shall be disposed of in such a manner as the Police Authority for Northern Ireland may direct.

— Health and Personal Social Services (Northern Ireland) Order 1978, PART II – Sale of Tobacco, Etc. to Persons Apparently Under 18

== Smoking bans ==
Smoking in workplaces and enclosed public spaces has been illegal since 26 March 2006 in Scotland, 2 April 2007 in Wales, 30 April 2007 in Northern Ireland and 1 July 2007 in England.

On 1 October 2015, a law was passed which banned smoking in vehicles with anyone under eighteen years of age present. The law does not apply to e-cigarettes, if the driver is seventeen years of age and alone in the vehicle, or in a convertible with the roof completely down.

== Further restrictions ==
On 6 April 2012, the display of tobacco products was banned in retailers larger than 280 square metres (3000 sq. ft.) in England. The ban affected small retailers three years later on 6 April 2015. In Scotland, a ban on the display of tobacco products for large retailers entered into force in April 2013. The ban for display for small retailers entered into force in April 2015.

In March 2011, the Conservative-Liberal Democrat coalition government committed itself to holding a public consultation on the introduction of plain tobacco packaging. Influenced by the introduction of plain packaging in Australia, the House of Commons voted 367–113 in March 2015 to pass the Children and Families Act 2014, which gave the government the power to require plain packaging for tobacco products. This came into force on 20 May 2016, but tobacco companies were given one year to sell off remaining stock, after which all tobacco products sold in the UK would have to follow plain packaging laws.

== Electronic cigarettes (vapes) ==
Despite the name "e-cigarette," these devices contain no tobacco and produce no smoke. They are used as an alternative to smoking, or as devices where it increasingly looks as if they are helping young people avoid smoking. Two hospitals run by Sandwell and West Birmingham Hospitals NHS Trust opened vape shops in 2019 in conjunction with a ban on smoking. Public Health England advises hospitals to let patients vape indoors and in bed.

On 2 April 2014, the Welsh Government published a public health white paper in which it proposed a ban on the use of e-cigarettes in public spaces. The Bill was subsequently defeated.

The annual Smokefree GB survey, published in May 2017, concluded that 52% of the 2.9 million British e-cigarette users are now ex-smokers. 26% of respondents thought e-cigarettes were as harmful as real cigarettes. In March 2017, it was reported by The Telegraph that the UK's e-cigarette boom is in decline, with the number of people using e-cigarettes in Britain decreasing for the first time since their launch.

In 2019, there were estimated to be 3 million e-cigarette users in Great Britain, with approximately half reporting using them as an aid to stop smoking.

According to the Office for National Statistics, 10.0% of adults in Great Britain used e-cigarettes daily or occasionally in 2024, compared with 9.1% who smoked cigarettes, making 2024 the first year in which current e-cigarette use exceeded current smoking.

Vaping/e-cigarette statistics in Great Britain

Percentage of people who vape in Great Britain

Percentage of men who vape in Great Britain

Percentage of females who vape in Great Britain

Percentage of people who have never vaped in Great Britain

Percentage of men who have never vaped in Great Britain

Percentage of females who have never vaped in Great Britain

== See also ==
- Imperial Brands, formerly Imperial Tobacco
- Health in the United Kingdom
- History of public health in the United Kingdom
- List of tobacco-related topics
