= Patient and Client Council (Northern Ireland) =

Patient safety organisation

Non-departmental public boody overview
- Formed: 2009
- Non-departmental public boody executive: Ruth Sutherland, Chair
- Key documents: Health and Social Care (Reform) Act (Northern Ireland) 2009; The Patient and Client Council (Membership and Procedure) Regulations (Northern Ireland) 2009
- Website: pcc-ni.net

The Patient and Client Council (PCC) was first established in 2009 as part of the Health and Social Care (Reform) Act (Northern Ireland) 2009 promotes patients' interests to the Health and Social Care.

The council consists of 5 members from district councils, 5 members from voluntary organisations with an interest in health and social care, and 1 member from a trade union.

== Reports ==
In October 2020, the PCC submitted evidence to the Health Committee of the Assembly regarding the impact of COVID-19 on care homes - heavily criticising the visitation arrangements of care homes.

In December 2020, the PCC released a report on the impact of shielding in Northern Ireland, suggesting improvements in accessibility for people shielding. In January 2021, the PCC released a report on health literacy, calling for greater patient involvement in making decisions.

In May 2022, the PCC released a report on grief and bereavement describing public concerns about the stigma associated with death and the specific stigmas associated with suicide.

In February 2023, the PCC released a report on the possible closure of Muckamore Abbey Hospital describing concerns about replacement services.

== Controversies ==
In August 2023, the PCC was reprimanded by the Information Commissioner's Office over a data breach.

== See also ==
- Llais (Wales)
- Patient Safety Commissioner for Scotland
- Patient Safety Commissioner for England
