= Disabled Persons' Parking Places (Scotland) Act 2009 =

Act of the Scottish Parliament

- Act of the Scottish Parliament
- Scottish Parliament
- Long title: An Act of the Scottish Parliament to make provision for the duties of local authorities in relation to parking places for use by disabled persons' vehicles; and for connected purposes.
- Citation: 2009 asp 3
- Territorial extent: Scotland

Dates
- Royal assent: 1 April 2009
- Commencement: 26 February 2009

Status: Current legislation

Text of statute as originally enacted

Text of the Disabled Persons' Parking Places (Scotland) Act 2009 as in force today (including any amendments) within the United Kingdom, from legislation.gov.uk.

The Disabled Persons' Parking Places (Scotland) Act 2009 (asp 3) was an act of the Scottish Parliament to make provision for the duties of local authorities in relation to parking places for use by disabled persons' vehicles, which was passed by Parliament on 26 February 2009 and received royal assent on 1 April 2009.

== See also ==
- List of acts of the Scottish Parliament from 1999
