= Irish Sign Language Act 2017 =

Irish law

Oireachtas
- Long title: An Act to provide for the recognition of Irish Sign Language, its use in legal proceedings and the provision of interpretation into Irish Sign Language by public bodies and to provide for related matters.
- Citation: No. 40 of 2017
- Territorial extent: Ireland
- Passed by: Dáil
- Passed: 17 October 2017
- Passed by: Seanad
- Passed: 14 December 2017
- Signed by: President Michael D. Higgins
- Signed: 24 December 2017
- Commenced: Commenced: 23 December 2020

Legislative history

First chamber: Dáil
- Bill title: Irish Sign Language Bill 2016
- Bill citation: No. 78 of 2016
- Introduced by: Minister for Health (Stephen Donnelly)
- Introduced: 29 January 2023
- Committee responsible: Health
- First reading: 21 July 2016
- Second reading: 21 June 2017
- Considered by the Health Committee: 17 October 2017
- Report and Final Stage: 17 October 2017

Second chamber: Seanad
- Second reading: 14 December 2017
- Considered in committee: 14 December 2017
- Report and Final Stage: 14 December 2017

Final stages
- Seanad amendments considered by the Dáil: 14 December 2017
- Finally passed both chambers: 14 December 2017

Summary
- Recognises Irish Sign Language with official legal status
- Status: In force

The Irish Sign Language Act 2017 (Act No. 13 of 2017; previously Bill No. 40 of 2017) is an Act of the Oireachtas (Irish parliament) which gives Irish Sign Language official legal status.

== Background ==
Broadly, before the bill was passed there were large swathes of public services that were inaccessible to deaf people.

In 2015, it was noted by Mental Health Reform that unless a user of mental health services books an interpreter in advance, there is no way to communicate this in advance.

In 2017, the Citizens Information Board published a report criticising a lack of interpreters in public organisations as undermining of the self-worth of deaf people and quite possibly clinically dangerous in a medical context due to the possibility of a misunderstanding leading to significant clinical risk.

In 2020, primary education was criticised as extremely exclusionary and inaccessible to deaf children.

The campaign for Irish Sign Language to gain legal recognition took 35 years from the start of the campaign to commencement.

== Commencement of the law ==
The law commenced on 23 December 2020.

== Impact ==
One year after commencement, according to a report by the National Disability Authority into the operation of the law, awareness among public bodies about there was very low. The Irish Government delayed publication by 1 year due to an "ongoing legal issue".

== See also ==
- Sign Language Bill (Northern Ireland)
- British Sign Language Act 2022
- Accessible Canada Act
- New Zealand Sign Language Act 2006
