= Patient Safety Commissioner =

Official tasked to advocate on behalf of patients

The Patient Safety Commissioner is a UK public position, overseeing an independent advisory body of the same name. The position was created following the passing of the Medicines and Medical Devices Act 2021, effective on 11 February 2021, promoting patient safety. This entails listening, advocating, holding the system to account, monitoring trends, and demanding action where necessary as recommended by the Cumberlege Report.

The Commissioner's work is politically independent, and the position of a commissioner lasts three years.

== See also ==
- Patient Safety Commissioner for Scotland
- Patient and Client Council (Northern Ireland)
- Llais (Wales)
