= Tobacco and Primary Medical Services (Scotland) Act 2010 =

Act of the Scottish Parliament

Tobacco and Primary Medical Services (Scotland) Act 2010 (Note: Section 43(1).)
- Act of the Scottish Parliament
- Scottish Parliament
- Long title: An Act of the Scottish Parliament to make provision about the retailing of tobacco products, including provision prohibiting the display of tobacco products and establishing a register of tobacco retailers; to amend the criteria for eligibility to provide primary medical services under the National Health Service (Scotland) Act 1978; and for connected purposes.
- Citation: 2010 asp 3
- Territorial extent: Scotland

Dates
- Royal assent: 3 March 2010
- Commencement: various (Note: Section 43(2)–(3).)

Other legislation
- Amends: Children and Young Persons (Scotland) Act 1937; National Health Service (Scotland) Act 1978; Tobacco Advertising and Promotion Act 2002
- Amended by: Health (Tobacco, Nicotine etc. and Care) (Scotland) Act 2016; Tobacco and Vapes Act 2026

Status: Amended

Text of statute as originally enacted

Revised text of statute as amended

Text of the Tobacco and Primary Medical Services (Scotland) Act 2010 as in force today (including any amendments) within the United Kingdom, from legislation.gov.uk.

The Tobacco and Primary Medical Services (Scotland) Act 2010 (asp 3) is an act of the Scottish Parliament.

== Provisions ==
The act established the Scottish Tobacco Retailers Register. The act established a registration scheme for retailers.

The act introduced a ban on cigarette vending machines.

The act allowed for fixed penalty notices for retailers who display cigarettes behind the counter.

The act allows for fixed penalty notices for retailers who sell cigarettes to individuals under the age of 18.

== See also ==
- Smoking in the United Kingdom
