= British Sign Language Act 2022 =

- Act of Parliament
- Parliament of the United Kingdom
- Long title: An Act to recognise British Sign Language as a language of England, Wales and Scotland; to require the Secretary of State to report on the promotion and facilitation of the use of British Sign Language by ministerial government departments; and to require guidance to be issued in relation to British Sign Language.
- Citation: 2022 c. 34
- Introduced by: Rosie Cooper (Commons); Lord Holmes of Richmond (Lords)
- Territorial extent: England and Wales; Scotland

Dates
- Royal assent: 28 April 2022
- Commencement: 28 June 2022

Status: Partly in force

History of passage through Parliament

Text of statute as originally enacted

Text of the British Sign Language Act 2022 as in force today (including any amendments) within the United Kingdom, from legislation.gov.uk.

The British Sign Language Act 2022 (c. 34) is an act of the Parliament of the United Kingdom, which legally recognises British Sign Language (BSL) as a language of England, Scotland and Wales. It also requires the Secretary of State to publish reports each reporting period on how BSL is promoted or facilitated by certain government department. The first of these reports was published on 31 July 2023.

== Passage ==
The British Sign Language Bill was introduced to the House of Commons as a private members' bill on 16 June 2021 by Rosie Cooper. The bill gained cross-party and government support before passing its second and third reading in the House of Commons and Lords without any difficulties. It received royal assent on 28 April 2022.

== Legal effect ==
The act legally recognises British Sign Language as a language of England, Scotland and Wales, a similar status to Welsh and Scottish Gaelic. The act does not include Northern Ireland in its scope since equality law is devolved in Northern Ireland. The act requires the government to publish reports on how the language is used in its public communications and issue guidance on promoting its usage. It is somewhat modelled in motives on the British Sign Language (Scotland) Act 2015 which places similar requirements on ministers in the Scottish Government.

== See also ==
- British Sign Language (Scotland) Act 2015
- Accessible Canada Act
- Irish Sign Language Act 2017
- Sign Language Bill (Northern Ireland) 2025
- New Zealand Sign Language Act 2006
