= Lists of acts of the Scottish Parliament =

These are lists of acts of the Scottish Parliament from its establishment in 1999 to the present.

- List of acts of the Scottish Parliament from 1999

- List of acts of the Scottish Parliament from 2000
- List of acts of the Scottish Parliament from 2001
- List of acts of the Scottish Parliament from 2002
- List of acts of the Scottish Parliament from 2003
- List of acts of the Scottish Parliament from 2004
- List of acts of the Scottish Parliament from 2005
- List of acts of the Scottish Parliament from 2006
- List of acts of the Scottish Parliament from 2007
- List of acts of the Scottish Parliament from 2008
- List of acts of the Scottish Parliament from 2009

- List of acts of the Scottish Parliament from 2010
- List of acts of the Scottish Parliament from 2011
- List of acts of the Scottish Parliament from 2012
- List of acts of the Scottish Parliament from 2013
- List of acts of the Scottish Parliament from 2014
- List of acts of the Scottish Parliament from 2015
- List of acts of the Scottish Parliament from 2016
- List of acts of the Scottish Parliament from 2017
- List of acts of the Scottish Parliament from 2018
- List of acts of the Scottish Parliament from 2019

- List of acts of the Scottish Parliament from 2020
- List of acts of the Scottish Parliament from 2021
- List of acts of the Scottish Parliament from 2022
- List of acts of the Scottish Parliament from 2023
- List of acts of the Scottish Parliament from 2024
- List of acts of the Scottish Parliament from 2025
- List of acts of the Scottish Parliament from 2026

== See also ==
- List of acts and measures of Senedd Cymru
- List of acts of the Northern Ireland Assembly
- List of acts of the Parliament of the United Kingdom
- List of acts of the Parliament of Great Britain
- List of acts of the Parliament of Scotland
- List of acts of the Parliament of England
- List of acts of the Parliament of Ireland
