= Tobacco and Vapes Act 2026 =

United Kingdom legislation

Tobacco and Vapes Act 2026 (Note: Section 178.)
- Act of Parliament
- Parliament of the United Kingdom
- Long title: A Bill to make provision about the supply of tobacco, vapes and other products, including provision prohibiting the sale of tobacco to people born on or after 1 January 2009 and provision about the licensing of retail sales and the registration of retailers; to enable product and information requirements to be imposed in connection with tobacco, vapes and other products; to control the advertising and promotion of tobacco, vapes and other products; and to make provision about smoke-free places, vape-free places and heated tobacco-free places.
- Citation: 2026 c. 18
- Introduced by: Wes Streeting, Secretary of State for Health and Social Care (Commons); Baroness Merron, Parliamentary Under-Secretary (Department of Health and Social Care) (Lords)
- Territorial extent: England and Wales (in part); Scotland (in part); Northern Ireland (in part); (Note: Section 174.)

Dates
- Royal assent: 29 April 2026
- Commencement: Various (Note: Section 175–176.)
Other legislation
Amends	Children and Young Persons Act 1933; Health and Personal Social Services (Northern Ireland) Order 1978; Protection of Children (Tobacco) Act 1986; Children and Young Persons (Protection from Tobacco) Act 1991; Children and Young Persons (Protection from Tobacco) (Northern Ireland) Order 1991; Local Government etc (Scotland) Act 1994; Merchant Shipping Act 1995; Police Reform Act 2002; Tobacco Advertising and Promotion Act 2002; Communications Act 2003; Courts Act 2003; Police (Northern Ireland) Act 2003; Smoking, Health and Social Care (Scotland) Act 2005; Health Act 2006; Prohibition of Smoking in Certain Premises (Scotland) Regulations 2006; Smoking (Northern Ireland) Order 2006; Criminal Justice and Immigration Act 2008; Regulatory Enforcement and Sanctions Act 2008; Health Act 2009; Tobacco and Primary Medical Services (Scotland) Act 2010; Police Reform and Social Responsibility Act 2011; Children and Families Act 2014; Tobacco Retailers Act (Northern Ireland) 2014; Consumer Rights Act 2015; Health (Tobacco, Nicotine etc. and Care) (Scotland) Act 2016; Tobacco and Related Products Regulations 2016; Health (Miscellaneous Provisions) Act (Northern Ireland) 2016; Public Health (Wales) Act 2017; Digital Markets, Competition and Consumers Act 2024; Media Act 2024

Status: Current legislation

History of passage through Parliament

Text of statute as originally enacted

The Tobacco and Vapes Act 2026 (c. 18) is an act of the Parliament of the United Kingdom to promote public health by reducing tobacco use in the United Kingdom. This act introduces a series of measures designed to phase out the sale of tobacco products for future generations, particularly targeting individuals born on or after 1 January 2009. It establishes a framework for regulating the sale, display, and advertising of tobacco and vaping products, thereby addressing the associated health risks.

The bill passed its three readings in the House of Commons between November 2024 and March 2025, and three in the House of Lords between March 2025 and March 2026. Following Royal Assent on 29 April 2026, the age restrictions on tobacco sales will take effect on 1 January 2027. According to the Associated Press, the UK now has the toughest anti-smoking measures in the world since New Zealand’s similar law was repealed in 2022.

== Background ==
On 4 October 2023, at the Conservative Party conference in Manchester, Prime Minister Rishi Sunak announced his intention to phase out cigarette smoking in the UK by raising the minimum age to purchase cigarettes from 18 each year, every year until eventually no person can legally buy cigarettes. A similar proposal was made by the Labour Party earlier that year.

Plans for the Tobacco and Vapes Bill, legislation implementing such a ban, were announced in the King's Speech during the 2023 State Opening of Parliament. The bill passed its first reading on 20 March 2024 and its second reading on 16 April 2024, with MPs allowed a whip-free vote on the matter. However the decision to call a summer 2024 general election meant that Parliament was dissolved and the legislation did not pass through Parliament. The newly elected government announced in July 2024 they would re-introduce these measures in the first session of the new parliament.

On 24 October 2024, the government announced a ban on the sale of single-use vapes, effective from June 2025, in an effort to address environmental concerns and the rising prevalence of vaping among children.

On 5 November 2024, the government introduced the Tobacco and Vapes Bill, aiming to protect public health and reduce the harm caused by smoking. The bill proposed measures to phase out tobacco sales for those under 15, extend the indoor smoking ban to outdoor areas and introduce stricter regulations on vaping, including a ban on vape advertising and limitations on flavours and packaging. In 2026, the Act broadened the existing advertising legislation's definition of a tobacco product. The Committees of Advertising Practice (CAP) stated that the wider advertising legislation's definition of a tobacco product, will likely bring more products within its scope, including heated tobacco products. The other advertising provisions within the Act are subject to different commencement arrangements. The offences also apply to businesses that provided services involved in designing or printing prohibited content as well as internet-services through which they are published or distributed. The Act provides exceptions for conduits, caching or hosting services, under the condition that they remove or disable access to prohibited advertisement. The Act also establishes offences relating to proxy purchasing for adults who buy or attempt to buy tobacco products, vaping products or nicotine products for individuals born after 1 January 2009.

The bill distinguishes between tobacco products and other selected methods of nicotine consumption in its age-of-sale restrictions. These products are regulated by separate provisions and include vaping products and nicotine pouches, which can be used by smokers as cessation aids. Likewise, health evidence highlights the differences between product types. The Royal College of Physicians states that most of the harm caused by smoking is due to the combustion of tobacco, which releases toxic chemicals and potent carcinogens. Additionally, a policy statement by the American Association for Cancer Research classifies combustible cigarettes as the most harmful nicotine-containing product, primarily due to the toxicants emitted in the smoke inhaled by smokers. During the report stage of the Tobacco and Vapes Bill in the House of Lords, Health Minister Baroness Merron stated that there is a significant difference in safety between vapes and tobacco products, and although vaping is not risk-free, it is significantly less harmful than smoking.

== Summary of the bill ==
The bill makes it illegal to sell tobacco products to anyone born on or after 1 January 2009, aiming to create a smoke-free generation. It restricts advertising and sales of nicotine products, including a ban on selling vapes to anyone under 18 and selling them through vending machines. The bill also allows regulation of vaping products and expands smoke-free areas to include playgrounds and locations near schools and hospitals. The bill requires that premises acquire a license to be able to sell tobacco products to customers. In England, physical and online businesses selling tobacco products, herbal smoking products, cigarette papers, vaping products or nicotine products may be required to have separate personal and premises licences. The Tobacco and Vapes Act 2026 includes England, Wales, Northern Ireland while strengthening Scotland's existing retail register. Scotland had already implemented the Scottish Tobacco Retail Register (STRR) in April 2011 with similar bans. On 29 October 2026, the bills restriction on free distribution and discounting came into effect.

== Parliamentary passage ==
=== House of Commons ===
The bill received its first reading on 5 November 2024. The second reading with a debate and votes from MPs occurred on 26 November. It was passed with 415 in favour to 47 against. It was then sent to a Public Bill Committee which debated the Bill, and reported it with amendments to the House of Commons on 30 January 2025. It had its report stage and third reading on 26 March 2025, where it passed with 366 in favour and 41 against.

=== House of Lords ===
The bill's first reading in the House of Lords, a formal procedure which signals the start of its journey within the Lords, took place on 27 March 2025. Its second reading took place on 23 April. It had seven days of line-by-line examination in committee stage between 27 October and 26 November 2025, after which some amendments to the Bill were put forward. Report stage was held on 24 February 2026 and 3 March, and the third reading was on 9 March.

The bill then returned to the House of Commons for the consideration of Lords amendments on 23 March 2026, and went to the House of Lords for consideration of amendments by the House of Commons on 20 April 2026. On that date, the House of Lords voted final approval of the bill. The bill received Royal Assent on 29 April 2026, becoming the Tobacco and Vapes Act 2026. Health Secretary Wes Streeting described the approval as "a turning point" for the nation's health.

On 14 May 2025, Lord Vaizey tabled an amendment to the Bill following his visit to the Swiss research facility of heated tobacco company Philip Morris International, which paid for Vaizey's flight and accommodation. He suggested that more research was needed into comparing the harm to human health from heated tobacco relative to the harm of smoking cigarettes. Martin McKee, professor of European public health at the London School of Hygiene & Tropical Medicine, suggested that a better comparison would be to compare its harm relative to not smoking at all.

== Reactions ==
While the Bill was supported by a majority of Parliament across both parties, it was criticised by Reform UK leader Nigel Farage, who compared it to the "puritanical spirit" of Oliver Cromwell and pledged to repeal the law if he becomes Prime Minister.

The bill was supported by health organisations, including Cancer Research UK, Action on Smoking and Health and Royal College of Paediatrics and Child Health. In an August 2024 YouGov poll, 61% of UK adults supported the efforts to phase out smoking by banning it for people born after 1 January 2009, while 27% opposed it. 81% supported the banning of disposable vapes, while 13% opposed it.

In March 2026, the Association of Convenience Stores (ACS) started an awareness campaign to assist retailers to prepare for the bill's age verification rules.

The Department of Health and Social Care began a consultation in July 2026 for the introduction of plain packaging and restrictions on flavour descriptions for vapes. The 12-week, UK-wide consultation also covered the permitted colours of vaping devices and how vaping and nicotine products should be displayed in shops.

In response to the bill, vaping firms argued that the restrictions could lead some former smokers to return to tobacco or obtain products through unregulated markets.

Following opposition from bar owners, the proposal to prohibit smoking in pub beer gardens was omitted from the reintroduced bill.

== See also ==
- Tobacco-free generation policies
