= European Charter of Local Self-Government (Incorporation) (Scotland) Bill =

- Bill
- Scottish Parliament
- Long title: An Act of the Scottish Parliament to incorporate in Scots law the European Charter of Local Self-Government, and for connected purposes.
- Introduced by: Andy Wightman MSP
- Territorial extent: Scotland

Dates
- Royal assent: 2 May 2023

Status: Not passed

The European Charter of Local Self-Government (Incorporation) (Scotland) Bill is a proposed bill of the Scottish Parliament, which is designed to incorporate the European Charter of Local Self-Government into Scots law.

== History ==
James Mitchell, chair in Public Policy at the University of Edinburgh, wrote for an LSE blog, recommending incorporating the Charter into Scots law.

Andy Wightman introduced the bill to safeguard certain rights of local government.

In 2020, the Law Society of Scotland released a document describing their concerns with the bill.

=== Reference to the Supreme Court ===
The UK government referred the bill to the Supreme Court. The Supreme Court upheld the challenge to the bill.

=== Aftermath of Supreme Court judgement ===
The Scottish Government has promised to introduce a version of the bill which would address the issues raised in the Supreme Court judgement but this has not happened yet.
