= Act of the Scottish Parliament =

Acts passed by the devolved Scottish Parliament

An act of the Scottish Parliament (Scottish Gaelic: Achd Pàrlamaid na h-Alba) is primary legislation made by the Scottish Parliament. The power to create acts was conferred to the Parliament by section 28 of the Scotland Act 1998 following the successful 1997 referendum on devolution.

Prior to the establishment of the Parliament under the 1998 act, all post-union laws specific to Scotland were passed at the Westminster Parliament. Although the Westminster Parliament has retained the ability to legislate for Scotland, by convention it does not do so without the consent of the Scottish Parliament. Since the passing of the 1998 act, the Westminster Parliament has passed five public general acts that apply only to Scotland.

A draft act is known as a bill. Once it is passed by the Scottish Parliament and receives royal assent, the bill becomes an act and is then a part of Scots Law.

== Classification of legislation ==
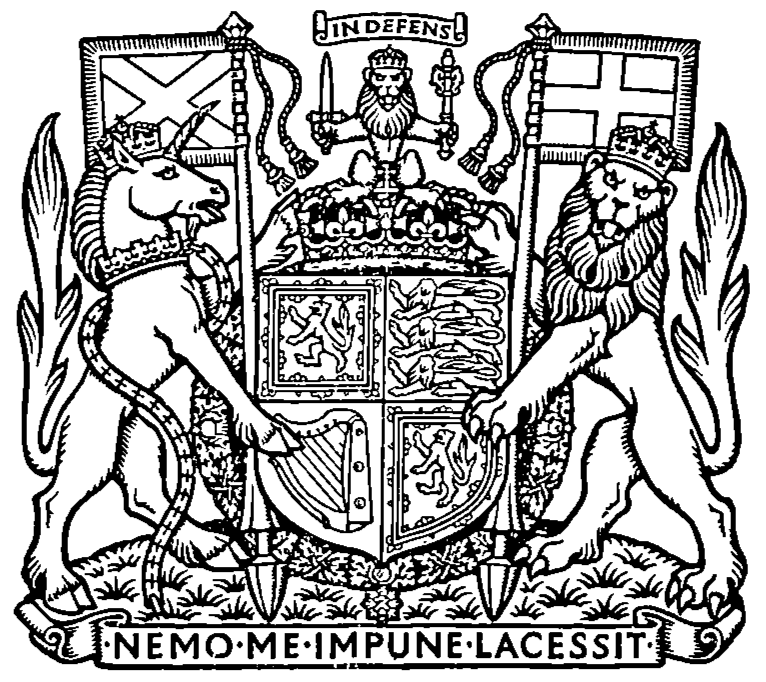
The Scottish version of the Royal Coat of arms of the United Kingdom appears on the covers of acts passed by the Scottish Parliament.

Scottish Parliament bills
Session	Bills			
Session	Public	Private	Hybrid	Total
1st (1999–2003)	70	3	—N/a	73
2nd (2003–2007)	72	9	—N/a	81
3rd (2007–2011)	59	2	1	62
4th (2011–2016)	81	5	0	86
5th (2016–2021)	82	5	0	87
6th (2021-2026)	80	0	0	80
7th (2026-)	TBD			

=== Public bills ===
A public bill is a bill which is introduced by a Member of the Scottish Parliament (MSP), and which will deal with the general laws of Scotland, rather than the law as it applies to a single person or organisation. Public bills are further divided into categories based on the MSP who proposed them: government bills (known as executive bills before September 2012) for a member of the Scottish Government; committee bills for the convener of one of the committees of the Scottish Parliament; or members' bills for any MSP who is not a member of the Scottish Government.

Public bills are the most common type of bill. In the Parliament's fourth session, 81 of the 86 proposed bills were public bills.

=== Private bills ===
A private bill (or sometimes a personal bill) is a bill which will apply only to the bill's promoter: the specific person, corporation, or unincorporated entity which is putting the bill before Parliament. For example, the National Trust for Scotland was created by act of Parliament in 1935, making its constitution part of the law. As a result, amending the Trust's constitution required an act of the Scottish Parliament – the National Trust for Scotland (Governance etc.) Act 2013. Certain private bills are classified as works bills. These are bills to grant the statutory power to construct or alter works such as bridges, docks, roads, or tunnels, or the statutory power to compulsorily purchase or use land or buildings.

Unlike with public bills, anyone with suitable interest in the outcome of a private bill (such as residents near the site of a proposed work) can lodge an objection and have it considered by a parliamentary committee.

Private bills also differ from public bills in that they can legislate outside of the legislative competence of the Scottish Parliament. If all of the provisions of a private bill are within the Parliament's legislative competence, then the bill's passage into an act is covered by the Parliament's standing orders. If not, however, then the bill's passage is covered under a 1936 act of the UK Parliament.

The number of private bills is low compared to public bills. In the fourth session of the Parliament, five of the 86 proposed bills were private bills.

=== Hybrid bills ===
A hybrid bill is a class of bill introduced in 2009. It is a combination of the characteristics of public and private bills and is intended for use where its contents relate to general law or public policy, but where those provisions may negatively affect specific persons or bodies (rather than the public in general). Hybrid bills are always introduced by a member of the Scottish Government and, like public bills, can make general law provisions within the Scottish Parliament's legislative competence. However, like private bills, any person with a suitable interest can object and have their objections considered by a parliamentary committee, and a hybrid bill can be classed as a works bill depending on its provisions.

The first hybrid bill put before the Parliament was the Forth Crossing Bill on 16 November 2009. This bill was later passed as the Forth Crossing Act 2011, which granted the Scottish Government the power to build the Queensferry Crossing.

== Stages of bills ==
There are a number of stages a bill must pass through before it becomes an act, but to pass through these stages it must first be introduced to Parliament. To be introduced, the bill is prepared in accordance with the Parliament's standing orders along with its supporting documents: statements on legislative competence; cost estimates relating to implementation of the bill; objective explanations of the bill's provisions; any reports from consultations relating to the bill; and a report from the Auditor General for Scotland if the bill authorises charges on the Scottish Consolidated Fund.

=== Internal to Parliament ===
Following a bill's introduction to Parliament, the first three stages a bill passes through are broadly defined by section 36 of the Scotland Act 1998. The precise process is set out by the Parliament's standing orders, and varies slightly depending on how the bill is classified.

==== General debate ====
The first stage after introduction is a debate of the bill's intentions and its general principles, referred to in the standing orders as Stage 1 and required by section 36(1)(a) of the 1998 act. The bill is referred to the relevant parliamentary committee or committees, plus the Delegated Powers and Law Reform committee (DPLR) if the bill allows the creation of secondary legislation. One of the relevant committees is designated the lead committee, and that committee prepares a report on the bill's general principles. The DPLR, if it is involved, will also prepare a report on the necessity of conferring the power to create secondary legislation.

Once prepared, the reports are presented to Parliament for consideration. The Parliament may move to have a further report produced by the lead committee (either on the bill as a whole or on a specific part), or proceed to debate. A debate considers the committee reports, and is concluded by the MSP in charge of the bill moving "that the Parliament agrees to the general principles of the bill." If that motion receives the support of the Parliament, the bill proceeds to Stage 2. If the motion fails, the bill fails and does not proceed.

In certain cases it is necessary to receive Crown Consent before the bill can proceed, such as when the bill affects royal prerogative or the private interests of the monarch or monarchs. Generally, Crown Consent will only be sought in Stage 1 if a key component or a majority of the bill deals with matters that require consent.

==== Committee consideration ====
Once the Parliament agrees to the general principles of a bill, the bill progresses to Stage 2. In this stage, the bill may be referred back to the lead committee designated in Stage 1, or may be transferred to one or more other committees. Occasionally, a bill is transferred to a committee of the entire Scottish Parliament. The committees the bill is referred to then cover the bill in detail, and must agree on each individual portion (in contrast to Stage 1, where only the general idea of the bill must be agreed on). Specifically, the committees must agree on individual sections of the bill, schedules to the bill, and the bill's long title, and must do so in that order unless the committees or Parliament decide otherwise.

In this stage, a bill can be amended, and any submitted amendments to a portion of the bill must be considered before a committee can agree on that portion. MSPs not on any Stage 2 committees can participate in discussion and submit amendments, but can't vote on whether amendments are accepted or rejected. Depending on the amendments submitted, it may be required to update the bill's supporting documents. The Stage 2 committees, unlike the Stage 1 committees, do not produce a report on the bill.

Stage 2 partially fulfils the requirements of section 36(1)(b) of the 1998 act, along with Stage 3.

==== Parliament consideration ====
Following committee consideration, the bill is presented "as amended" to a meeting of the entire Scottish Parliament, where it is again debated and can again be amended. This is Stage 3, and fulfils the requirements of sections 36(1)(b) and 36(1)(c) of the 1998 act. Unlike in Stage 2, the Parliament will only debate those amendments selected by the Presiding Officer of the Scottish Parliament. Amendments are considered in order of the portions of the bill they amend, unless Parliament agrees to consider them in a different order.

Following the debate and consideration of the bill and any Stage 3 amendments, the Parliament may opt to send the bill back to Stage 2 for further consideration. However, if it is felt that adequate consideration has already been had, the Parliament will vote on whether to pass the bill. If the bill does not receive a majority in-favour votes, or if the vote is invalid, the bill fails and does not proceed. The vote is considered invalid when an electronic vote is taken and fewer than a quarter of (129 total) MSPs vote.

If Crown Consent is required and was not gained before Stage 3, it will usually be gained before the start of the vote on whether to pass the bill.

=== External to Parliament ===
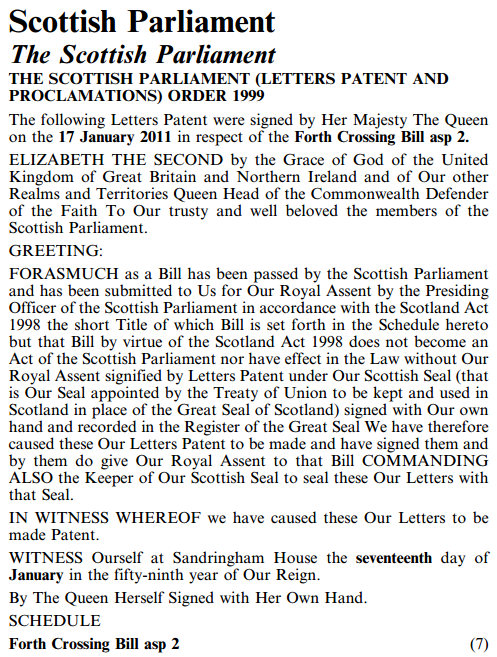
The text of the Letters Patent granting royal assent for the Forth Crossing Act 2011, as it appeared in the Edinburgh Gazette.

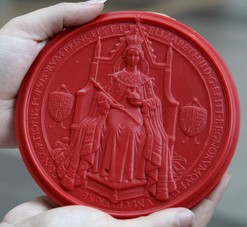
The Great Seal of Scotland in red beeswax. An impression like this is attached to all Letters Patent giving royal assent.

Once passed by Parliament, the stages a bill passes through before becoming an act are set out by sections 32 to 36 of the Scotland Act 1998. These stages generally do not involve Parliament.

==== Statutory challenge ====
A passed bill may be challenged by the Advocate General for Scotland, the Lord Advocate, or the Attorney General, who can refer it under section 33 of the 1998 act to the Supreme Court of the United Kingdom for review. The Supreme Court will then determine whether the bill is within the Parliament's legislative competence; before the UK left the European Union in 2020, it could also decide whether the bill was to be referred to the European Court of Justice (ECJ) for review. Such a challenge may be lodged within the four weeks following the passing or approval of the bill. If a bill was referred to the ECJ, the Parliament could move to reconsider the bill and have the reference withdrawn. If the reference is only to the Supreme Court, the Parliament must wait for the Court's decision. This type of statutory challenge is termed a Section 33 reference. For example, this occurred with the European Charter of Local Self-Government (Incorporation) (Scotland) Bill and the United Nations Convention on the Rights of the Child (Incorporation) (Scotland) Bill - the UNCRC bill was later modified and passed as the United Nations Convention on the Rights of the Child (Incorporation) (Scotland) Act 2024.

The Secretary of State may also challenge by order under section 35 of the 1998 act. Section 35 provides that such challenges must be on the grounds that the bill: is incompatible with international obligations; is incompatible with the interests of defence or national security; or deals with reserved matters and will have "an adverse effect on the operation of the law." These orders can be created within the four weeks following the passing or approval of the bill, or within four weeks following the lodging of a section 33 reference against the bill. The orders can remain active indefinitely, and are referred to as Section 35 orders.For example, this occurred with the Gender Recognition Reform (Scotland) Bill.

==== Royal assent ====
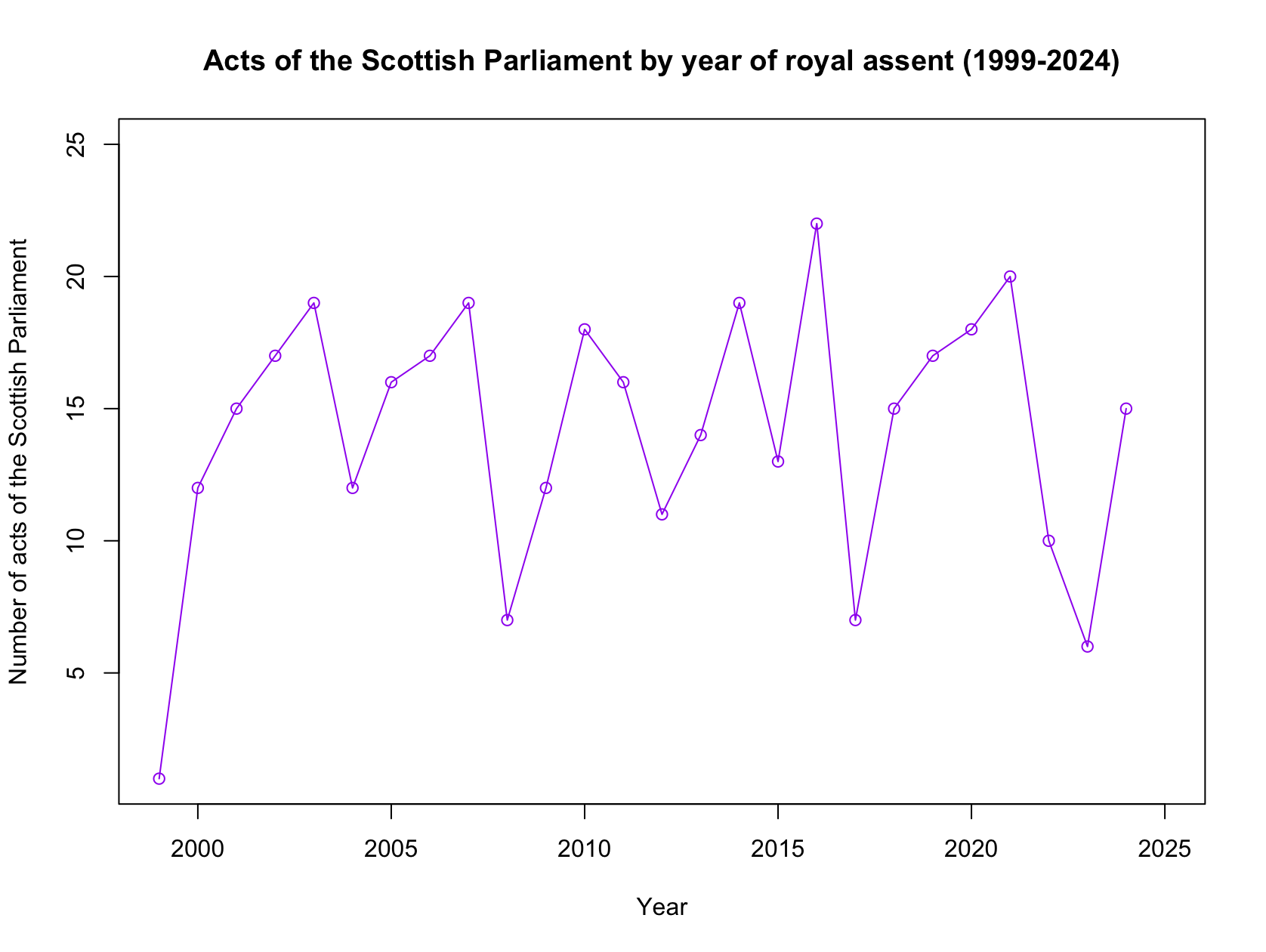
Line graph showing the number of acts of the Scottish Parliament by year of royal assent

The final stage before a bill can be classed as an act is the receiving of royal assent – the approval of the monarch. Although the actual process of royal assent is a formality – royal assent has not been refused for 319 years – sections 28 and 32 of the 1998 act mean that a bill cannot become an act without royal assent. A bill is submitted for royal assent by the Presiding Officer, who may only do so after either waiting for the four-week statutory challenge period to expire or after receiving confirmation that no statutory challenge will be lodged.

A bill receives royal assent through Letters Patent under the Great Seal of Scotland. The Letters Patent are of the form:

Letters patent for an act receiving Royal assent

CHARLES THE THIRD by the Grace of God of the United Kingdom of Great Britain and Northern Ireland and of Our other Realms and Territories King Head of the Commonwealth Defender of the Faith To Our trusty and well beloved the members of the Scottish Parliament.

GREETING:

FORASMUCH as various bills have been passed by the Scottish Parliament and have been submitted to Us for Our Royal Assent by the Presiding Officer of the Scottish Parliament in accordance with the Scotland Act 1998 the short Titles of which bills are set forth in the Schedule hereto but those bills by virtue of the Scotland Act 1998 do not become acts of the Scottish Parliament nor have any effect in the Law without Our Royal Assent signified by Letters Patent under Our Scottish Seal (that is Our Seal appointed by the Treaty of Union to be kept and used in Scotland in place of the Great Seal of Scotland) signed with Our own hand and recorded in the Register of the Great Seal We have therefore caused these Our Letters Patent to be made and have signed them and by them do give Our Royal Assent to those bills COMMANDING ALSO the Keeper of Our Scottish Seal to seal these Our Letters with that Seal.

IN WITNESS WHEREOF we have caused these Our Letters to be made Patent.

WITNESS Ourself at [...] the [...] day of [...] in the [...] year of Our Reign.

By The King Himself Signed with His Own Hand.

Once the Letters Patent are received and sealed, the bill becomes an act of the Scottish Parliament. However, parts of or even the entire act may not immediately have effect. An extreme example of this is the Easter Act 1928, an act of the United Kingdom Parliament which has never been put into effect.

==== Coming into force ====
A bill, after becoming an act, does not necessarily have legal force immediately. Most acts wholly or partially come into force the day after royal assent; many include provisions that must be brought into force by a commencement order (a statutory instrument). One example is the Criminal Justice (Scotland) Act 2016, which includes provisions for both:

117 Commencement

(1) The following provisions come into force on the day after Royal Assent—

(a) sections 71 and 73 to 77,
(b) this Part.

(2) The other provisions of this Act come into force on such day as the Scottish Ministers may appoint.
(3) An order under subsection (2) may include transitional, transitory, or saving provision.

— Section 117, Criminal Justice (Scotland) Act 2016 (asp 1)

As of July 2016, two commencement orders have brought sections 84 and 112 of that act, respectively, into force. Section 84 was brought into force on 10 March 2016, and section 112 on 1 July 2016.

== Style of an act ==
=== Numbering ===
The numbering of acts of the Scottish Parliament closely resembles that of acts of other devolved legislatures in the UK, and of acts of the UK Parliament. An act's number consists of the calendar year in which the act received royal assent, followed by the abbreviation "asp" (for Act of the Scottish Parliament), followed by a number which increases consecutively from one with each act in the calendar year. Thus, the first act of 2016 is numbered 2016 asp 1, the second is 2016 asp 2, and so on. The first act of 2017 is 2017 asp 1 because the final number resets each calendar year.

If multiple acts receive royal assent on the same day, they are numbered based on the order in which their Letters Patent are received. If multiple acts are specified in a single Letters Patent, the acts are numbered by the order in which they are mentioned in the Letters.

=== Citation ===
An act can be cited in a number of ways: by reference to its short title ("Criminal Justice (Scotland) Act 2016"); by reference to its full number ("2016 asp 1"); or both ("Criminal Justice (Scotland) Act 2016 (asp 1)"), although the exact appearance of this type of citation generally depends on the style guide in use.

=== Enactment formula ===
The enactment formula for acts of the Scottish Parliament is non-typical – unlike many others, it doesn't begin with a variation of the phrase "be it enacted..." or state from where the Parliament derives authority (a deity or the sovereign). Instead, it states the date of the bill being passed by the Parliament and the date of that bill receiving royal assent (i.e. becoming an act), in the manner as follows:

The Bill for this Act of the Scottish Parliament was passed by the Parliament on 28th April 2010 and received Royal Assent on 3rd June 2010

— Interpretation and Legislative Reform (Scotland) Act 2010 (asp 10)

The enactment formula is then immediately followed by the act's long title, and then the contents of the act.

=== Divisions ===
Divisions of an act
Name	Number style	Continuous?	Optional?
Main body of an act
Part	1, 2, 3, ...	Yes	Yes
Chapter	1, 2, 3, ...	No	Yes
Section	1, 2, 3, ...	Yes	No
Subsection	(1), (2), (3), ...	No	Yes
Paragraph	(a), (b), (c), ...	No	Yes
Sub-paragraph	(i), (ii), (iii), ...	No	Yes
Head (Sub-sub-para.)	(A), (B), (C), ...	No	Yes

A division of a bill or act is a component, generally numbered, dealing with increasingly discrete topics, equivalent to the chapters of a book. For example, the highest-level division might be "trees," with two subdivisions for evergreen and deciduous trees, with each of those having subdivisions for particular species of trees. Different divisions are used depending on the role of that division (e.g. parts versus schedules).

A table of divisions is shown. In this table "Continuous?" indicates whether the numbering of those divisions continues across divisions, or whether the numbering resets to the first value in the sequence at the start of the next-highest-level division. The "Optional?" column indicates whether, within that portion of the act, that division can be omitted. While addenda are themselves optional, an addendum to an act must use the paragraph division.

==== Body of the act ====
The main body matter of an act is divided into parts, then chapters, then sections, then subsections, then paragraphs, then sub- and sub-sub-paragraphs (or "heads"). The only division that must be used is the section; all others are optional, although chapters cannot be used without parts. These divisions are almost always numbered, although paragraphs may occasionally not be numbered, such as when being used for a list of definitions.

==== Addenda to the act ====
Some acts have schedules, a type of addendum, which give additional information. Schedules are commonly used to provide lists of amendments to other acts, but may be used anywhere it may not be appropriate to include the information in the act's main text. For example, section 1 of the Charities and Trustee Investment (Scotland) Act 2005 gives a general definition of the Office of the Scottish Charity Regulator, while schedule 1 to that act gives more detail; and schedule 1 to the Budget (Scotland) Act 2016 sets out the purposes for which money will be allocated to the Scottish Government, and how much money will be allocated to those purposes.

If there are multiple schedules, each is individually numbered; otherwise a schedule is not numbered. Schedules are then divided into parts, then chapters, then paragraphs, and then sub-paragraphs in the same way as the sections of the main body of the act. As with the main body, parts and chapters are optional, and chapters cannot be used without parts. Although schedules still have the full force of law like sections, they are counted as additions rather than main components of the act, and so a schedule is said to be "to an act" rather than "of an act."

==== Other ====
Both the main body of the act and its addenda may have cross-headings. These are non-numbered divisions that don't affect the numbering of other divisions, and serve to make reading the document easier. For example, Part 1 Chapter 2 ("Scottish Charity Register") of the Charities Act mentioned above has cross-headings dividing it into portions related to the register itself, applying for entry to the register, acceptable names for charities on the register, and so on. Cross-headings are shown in italic type.

== See also ==
- Act of Parliament
- Scottish Statutory Instrument
- Scottish Parliament
- List of acts of the Scottish Parliament
