= Government Expenditure and Revenue Scotland =

Government Expenditure and Revenue Scotland (GERS) is an annual estimate of the level of public revenue raised in Scotland and the level of public spending for the residents of Scotland within the United Kingdom. It was first published in 1992, and yearly since 1995, with the exceptions of 2007 where there was no report due to a methodology review, and 2016 where there were two annual reports due to an acceleration of publishing timescale.

Since devolution, it has been compiled by economists and statisticians in the Office of the Chief Economic Adviser of the Scottish Government. The report is based partly on actual spend and income. Where actual data is not readily available, estimates for Scotland are made by the compilers. The data for the estimates are from a variety of sources including pan-UK data provided by the UK Government's Office for National Statistics (ONS). ONS in England and Wales co-ordinates data collection with the respective bodies in Northern Ireland and Scotland, namely NISRA and National Records of Scotland. GERS is designated as a National Statistics product, which means that it is produced independently of Scottish Ministers and has been assessed by the UK Statistics Authority as being produced in line with the Code of Practice for Statistics.

== Background ==
GERS was first published in 1992 by the Scottish Office in Edinburgh under the Conservative Party government of Prime Minister John Major, by Ian Lang the Secretary of State for Scotland at a time when the government was resisting calls for Scottish devolution. Its overall purpose was to estimate the overall UK borrowing requirement for Scotland: it was created at this time because Scottish Office ministers thought, due to then-low oil prices, the report would show that Scotland gained far more from the UK Treasury than it received. In a leaked memo the then Secretary of State for Scotland Ian Lang wrote "I judge that [GERS] is just what is needed at present in our campaign to maintain the initiative and undermine the other parties. This initiative could score against all of them.”

The methodology of this first report was questioned. Economics professor Hervey Gibson recalled "My reaction, both emotional and professional, was that where Scotland was making disproportionate drawings on the National (UK) exchequer these had usually been carefully estimated and emphasised, and where it was making net or disproportionate contributions to the exchequer these had been assumed away or hidden under crude assumptions about 'reflecting national averages'".

The second report was published in November 1995, covering financial year 1993-1994. Reports for each financial year since this year have been published.

In 1998, the University of Strathclyde published the Jim and Margaret Cuthbert-authored "A critique of GERS: government expenditure and revenue in Scotland." This criticised primarily the adequacy of the methodology used and the accuracy of data sources as well as the purpose of a GERS exercise.

In 1999, GERS (for financial year 1997/1998) was published by the newly formed Scottish Executive for the first time.

In 2008, GERS for 2006/7 was published, including data for 2005/2006. (There was no report in 2007.) This was the first fundamental review of GERS since it achieved National Statistics status in 2005. The changes were also instigated under the new SNP government who wished to address the criticisms noted above and were supported by the Cuthberts in their changes. A number of presentation, data source and methodology changes were made. None of the changes radically altered the results of the analysis of Scotland's fiscal balance. The Cuthberts welcomed the "significant" methodological improvements, though noting scope for further improvements in overall Scottish financial reporting (not related to GERS itself).

== The report ==
=== Objective ===
The stated primary objective of the authors of GERS is to estimate a set of public sector accounts for Scotland through detailed analysis of official UK and Scottish Government finance statistics. The authors estimate the contribution of revenue raised in Scotland toward the goods and services provided for the benefit of the people of Scotland."

=== Data sources ===
The 2015-16 GERS report states:

- The source of the revenue data in GERS is the ONS's Public Sector Finances, which provides disaggregated figures relating to UK public sector revenue.
- The primary data sources used to estimate Scottish public sector expenditure in GERS are HM Treasury's Public Expenditure Statistical Analyses and the supporting Country and Regional Analysis (CRA).
- GERS also makes use of the estimates of Scottish Gross Domestic Product (GDP) in current market prices published in the Quarterly National Accounts Scotland (QNAS).
- All estimates for Scotland made within GERS are conducted by the Scottish Government, the UK government do not estimate for Scotland nor are they involved in agreeing the data to be used by the Scottish Government.

=== Compilation ===
GERS is compiled by statisticians and economists in the Office of the Chief Economic Adviser of the Scottish Government, with the Scottish Government's chief statistician taking overall responsibility for the publication.

== Political use and criticism ==
GERS has frequently formed part of the debate on Scottish Independence. The Institute of Fiscal Studies said of GERS in 2022, "Pro-Union commentators have highlighted the large estimated deficits reported. On the other hand, some pro-Independence commentators have questioned the relevance of the figures by highlighting their backwards-looking nature, and the fact that they relate to Scotland’s position within the UK (including spending on UK-wide functions like defence, the UK parliament, and debt interest that is deemed to benefit Scotland). While this is true, and like any estimates they are subject to margins of error, they remain the best place to start for analysis of what an independent Scotland's public finances would initially look like. They are produced by the Scottish Government to high standards, free of political interference, which is reflected by their National Statistics certification."

=== GERS and the 2014 Scottish independence referendum ===
The governing Scottish National Party endorsed GERS during the campaign leading up to the 2014 independence referendum: in November 2012, Deputy First Minister Nicola Sturgeon described GERS figures that showed that Scotland had a net surplus as "another good reason to vote for independence". In November 2013, GERS figures from the most recent available report (financial year 2011/2012) were included within Scotland's Future, the Scottish Government's independence white paper. Based on the GERS report it was stated that, compared to the UK, Scotland contributed more tax per head, had stronger public finances and had much higher GDP per head.

Based on the methodologies used, falling oil revenues resulted in the final GERS report before the referendum, published in March 2014, indicating a weaker Scottish economic position than previous years. The nominal Scottish deficit went from 5% in financial year 2011/2012 to 8.3% in 2012/2013. First Minister Alex Salmond nevertheless claimed that GERS confirmed "Scotland is one of the wealthiest countries in the world". In August 2014, Finance Secretary John Swinney said that the GERS report showed that Scotland had been in a stronger financial position than the rest of the UK for the previous five years.

=== "GERS Denial" as a phenomenon in Scottish politics ===
Despite its status as an independent, Scottish Government-produced publication, GERS has been frequently denigrated by Scottish nationalists since the 2014 referendum, as it has shown Scotland having a growing deficit and a weakening economic position. This phenomenon has been described as "GERS Denial" by the press and statistics organisations, and characterised as a conspiracy theory.

In 2016, the pro-independence newspaper The National said that GERS' figures should be "discredited, recalculated or reframed" by a future referendum campaign. A 2021 poll by Survation found that 57% of Scottish independence supporters agree with the statement "The figures used to calculate Scotland's deficit (the GERS figures) are made up by Westminster to hide Scotland's true wealth", and 90% of those considered the statement to be "important" or "very important" to their opinion on Scottish independence.

The economist Richard Murphy has criticised the reliability of the data sources used for GERS and claimed they are "rigged by Westminster". Murphy stated that, "nothing will be the same if Scotland leaves: a government of an independent Scotland will have a very different structure to that imposed now." In a subsequent appearance before the Holyrood Finance and Constitution Committee, however, Murphy was criticised for being unable to justify these claims, and was unable to name a single country that uses his proposed accounting model. When pressed by Scottish Labour committee member Jackie Baillie, Murphy conceded that under his preferred accounting model, GERS would be only "a couple of percentage points" out.

Deloitte said of GERS figures in 2017, referring to the impact on Scotland of a recent global slump in oil prices, "Commentators suggested that, under these conditions, Scotland would struggle to operate as an independent country. However, GERS data is produced for Scotland as part of the UK - it does not model scenarios for an independent Scotland in which the Scottish government would be enabled to make its own fiscal choices". Graeme Roy of the Fraser of Allander Institute acknowledged shortcomings of GERS but said regarding the use of estimation: "But even significant differences in estimation – and well outside that which could be considered statistically reasonable – don’t change the overall headline figures". He concluded that of the topics worth debating, "questioning the integrity and robustness of National Statistics is not one of them". The Fraser of Allender Institute further described GERS as "an accredited National Statistics publication, meaning that the statistics have been independently assessed as being based on appropriate methods and produced without political interference."

In 2024, the campaign group Believe In Scotland called for an emergency debate at the Scottish National Party conference, describing the GERS figures as "ludicrous" and calling for the Scottish Government to cease publishing them, arguing that they do not provide an accurate picture of a Scottish economy under independence.

Despite several SNP conferences calling for the party leadership to find an alternative or to stop publishing GERS, and supportive statements from Scottish Government ministers, no progress has been made by the SNP in producing an alternative report on Scotland's finances. In 2017, SNP leader and First Minister Nicola Sturgeon acknowledged "the essence and the reliability of these figures" at that year's GERS briefing in Edinburgh, and acknowledged that an independent Scotland would run a deficit, but insisted it would have the economic levers "to grow our economy and take different decisions". In 2020, finance secretary Derek Mackay announced an "economic case for independence" as an alternative to the annual GERS figures. This was re-iterated by his successor Kate Forbes in 2021. However, these plans were abandoned during the COVID-19 pandemic.

== See also ==
- Barnett formula
- Cabinet Secretary for Finance, Employment and Sustainable Growth
- Commission on Scottish Devolution
- Fiscal autonomy for Scotland
- Local income tax (Scotland)
- Public Accounts Committee of the Scottish Parliament
- Public Contracts Scotland
- Scottish budget
- Scottish Consolidated Fund
- Scottish Variable Rate
- Scotland Bill 2011
- Taxation in Scotland
- Union dividend
