= Scottish budget =

Annual Act of the Scottish Parliament

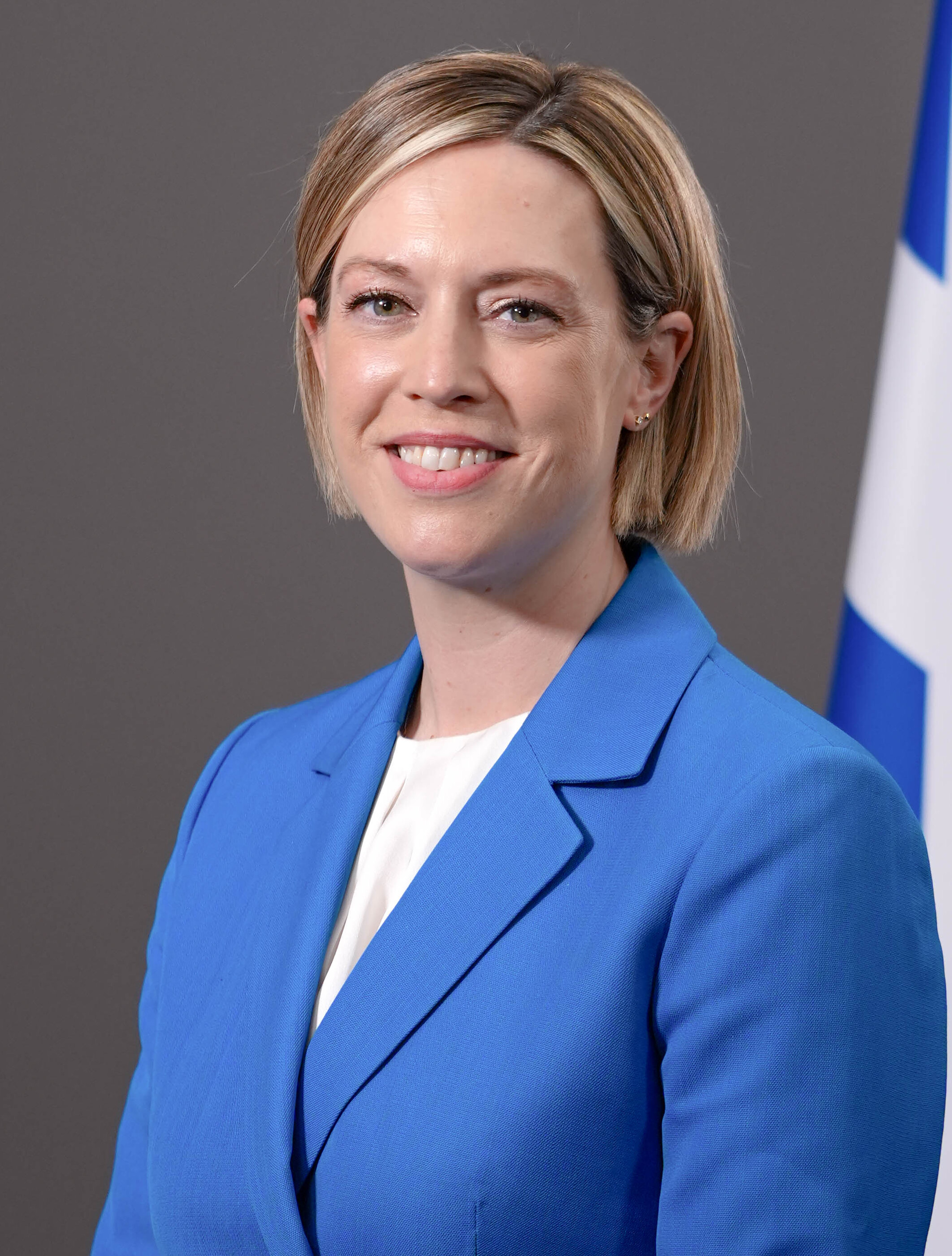
Current finance secretary Jenny Gilruth, since May 2026

The Scottish Government budget is an annual act of the Scottish Parliament, giving statutory authority to the Scottish Government for its revenue and expenditure plans. For the financial year 2026–2027, the budget was £67.9 billion. The Scottish Government Budget Bill is presented to Parliament by the Cabinet Secretary for Finance. The current Cabinet Secretary for Finance is Jenny Gilruth who was appointed to the role in May 2026.

== Budget process ==
The process for the Scottish Budget lasts throughout the entire fiscal year, beginning with the publication of the Medium–Term Financial Strategy (MTFS) which is usually completed in May of each year. The MTFS proposes the medium-term context for annual budget decisions through a process of presenting and determining the outlooks for funding and spending over a five-year period. Additionally, each sitting Scottish Government publishes their own Programme for Government at the commencement of each parliamentary term, with the budget outlining the objectives determined by the government in order to meet the commitments outlined in their Programme for Government paper. All spending decisions are subject to forecasts provided by the Scottish Fiscal Commission (SFC). The SFC predicts spending forecasts for the Scottish economy, tax receipts, social security expenditure, and an assessment of government projections of borrowing twice yearly.

The Scottish Budget must be presented to members of the Scottish Parliament for consideration, and is required to go through four stages before it comes into effects.

- Stage 1 – debate on the general principles of the Bill
- Stage 2 – changes to the Bill are suggested by Scottish Government Ministers
- Stage 3 – MSPs decide on any further changes proposed
- Members of the Scottish Parliament (MSPs) vote on whether to pass the Bill

Following this process, the budget is amended during the year via the Autumn and Spring Budget Revisions in order to implement any objections or alterations required as identified through parliamentary scrutiny. This supports financial scrutiny and allows the Scottish Parliament to authorise any changes to the Budget Act.

== Purpose ==
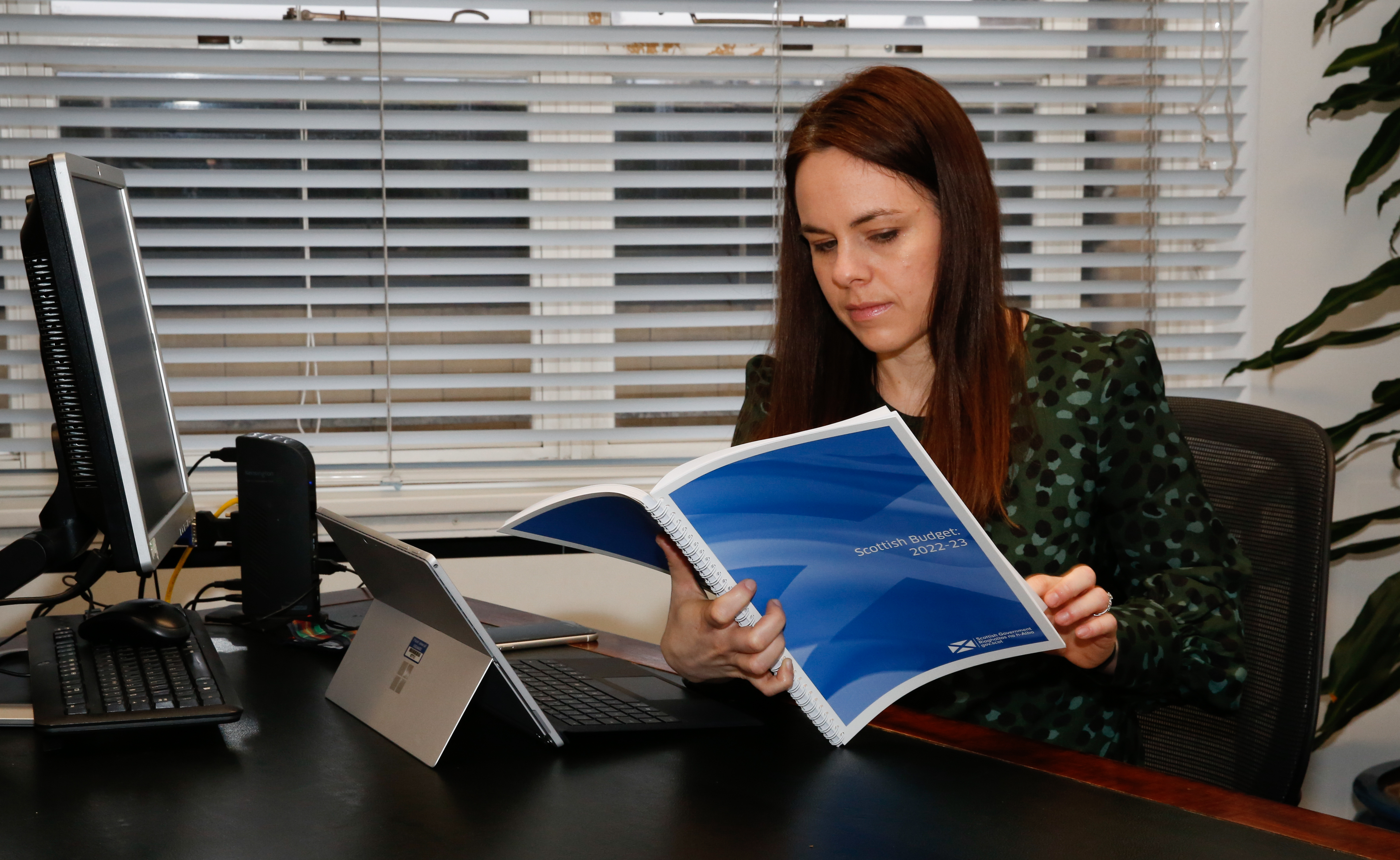
Finance Secretary, Kate Forbes, preparing the 2022–2023 budget

The Scottish Government is ultimately accountable to the members of the Scottish Parliament and to the Scottish public for its use of public money and how its spending is allocated. The Scottish Government allocates funding for areas which include schools, hospitals, policing, certain social security benefits, the economy, climate change and the environment, amongst others, from the Scottish budget. The Scottish budget is primarily funded via the Scottish block grant as well as revenue from devolved taxes. An agreement between the Scottish and UK Government, known as the Fiscal Framework, details arrangements on how Scotland is required to manage its funding which includes limits on borrowing powers as well as arrangements for a reserve fund to allow the transfer of funding between financial years.

Devolution permits the Scottish Parliament to determine funding for a range of public services through the Scottish Budget, including education, health, transportation, policing, economy and environment, amongst others. For the 2026–2027, the largest budget revenue spending was within the Health & Social Care sector, with total budget spending amounting to £22.5 billion, whilst the lowest budget revenue was allocated to the Crown Office and Procurator Fiscal Service at £260 million. A total of £183 million was allocated to both Audit Scotland and the Scottish Parliament as part of the Scottish Budget for the financial year 2026–2027, which was delivered in January 2026.

=== Scottish public finance ===
- Audit Scotland
- Barnett formula
- Commission on Scottish Devolution
- Finance Directorates
- Full fiscal autonomy for Scotland
- Government Expenditure and Revenue Scotland
- Local income tax (Scotland)
- Public Accounts Committee of the Scottish Parliament
- Public Contracts Scotland
- Scotland Act 2012
- Scottish Consolidated Fund
- Finance and Corporate Services Directorates
- Union dividend

== Taxation ==
The Scottish Parliament has the power to set the rates and bands of Income Tax paid by Scottish taxpayers on non-savings and non-dividend income which is collected by HM Revenue & Customs (HMRC), with the money raised through the tax then being transferred to the Scottish Government. There are three other taxes currently in operation that are fully devolved to the Scottish Parliament and are therefore set by the Scottish Parliament:

- Non-Domestic Rates (NDR)
- Land and Buildings Transaction Tax (LBTT)
- Scottish Landfill Tax (SLfT)

== Budget acts ==
=== 2000–2010 ===
- Budget (Scotland) Act 2000 (asp 2), presented by Jack McConnell
- Budget (Scotland) Act 2001 (asp 4), presented by Angus Mackay
- Budget (Scotland) Act 2002 (asp 7), presented by Andy Kerr
- Budget (Scotland) Act 2003 (asp 6), presented by Andy Kerr
- Budget (Scotland) Act 2004 (asp 2), presented by Andy Kerr
- Budget (Scotland) Act 2005 (asp 4), presented by Tom McCabe
- Budget (Scotland) Act 2006 (asp 5), presented by Tom McCabe
- Budget (Scotland) Act 2007 (asp 9), presented by Tom McCabe
- Budget (Scotland) Act 2008 (asp 2), presented by John Swinney
- Budget (Scotland) Act 2009 (asp 2), presented by John Swinney
- Budget (Scotland) Act 2010 (asp 4), presented by John Swinney

=== 2011–2020 ===
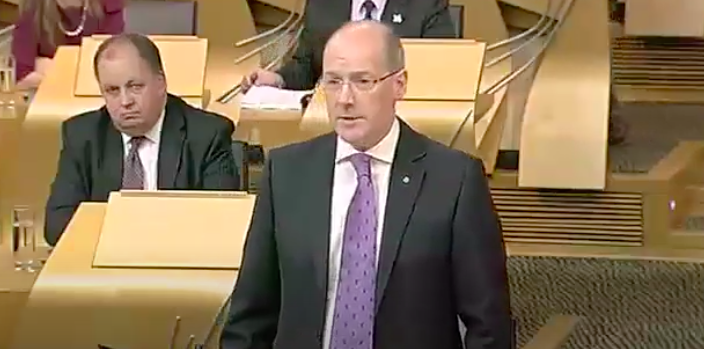
John Swinney delivers the budget statement to parliament, September 2012

- Budget (Scotland) Act 2011 (asp 4), presented by John Swinney
- Budget (Scotland) Act 2012 (asp 2), presented by John Swinney
- Budget (Scotland) Act 2013 (asp 4), presented by John Swinney
- Budget (Scotland) Act 2014 (asp 6), presented by John Swinney
- Budget (Scotland) Act 2015 (asp 2), presented by John Swinney
- Budget (Scotland) Act 2016 (asp 12), presented by John Swinney
- Budget (Scotland) Act 2017 (asp 1), presented by Derek Mackay
- Budget (Scotland) Act 2018 (asp 1), presented by Derek Mackay
- Budget (Scotland) Act 2019 (asp 3), presented by Derek Mackay
- Budget (Scotland) Act 2020 (asp 5), presented by Kate Forbes

=== 2021–present ===
- Budget (Scotland) Act 2021 (asp 8), presented by Kate Forbes
- Budget (Scotland) Act 2022 (asp 3), presented by John Swinney
- Budget (Scotland) Act 2023 (asp 2), presented by John Swinney
- Budget (Scotland) Act 2024 (asp 3), presented by Shona Robison
- Budget (Scotland) Act 2025 (asp 3), presented by Shona Robison

== See also ==
- Economy of Scotland
- European Union budget
- United Kingdom budget
- Countries of the United Kingdom by GVA per capita
- Government spending in the United Kingdom
- United Kingdom national debt
