= Scottish devolution =

Transfer of powers to Scotland

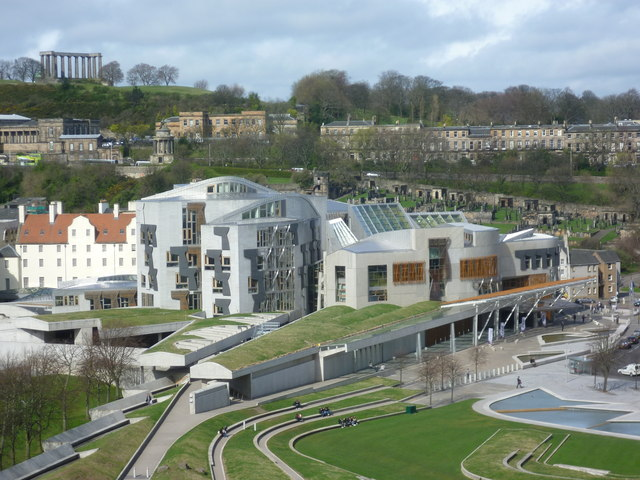
Scottish Parliament

Scottish devolution is the process of the UK Parliament granting powers (excluding powers over reserved matters) to the devolved Scottish Parliament. Prior to the advent of devolution, some had argued for a Scottish Parliament within the United Kingdom – while others have since advocated for complete independence. The people of Scotland first got the opportunity to vote in a referendum on proposals for devolution in 1979 and, although a majority of those voting voted 'Yes', the referendum legislation also required 40% of the electorate to vote 'Yes' for the plans to be enacted and this was not achieved. A second referendum opportunity in 1997, this time on a strong proposal, resulted in an overwhelming 'Yes' victory, leading to the Scotland Act 1998 being passed and the Scottish Parliament being established in 1999.

Scottish voters were given the chance to vote 'Yes' on outright independence in a 2014 referendum. In an effort to persuade Scots to remain in the Union, the major UK parties vowed to devolve further powers to Scotland after the referendum. The 'No' vote prevailed (independence was rejected) and the campaign promise of devolution resulted in the formation of the Smith Commission and the eventual passage of the Scotland Act 2016.

== 1707 to 1999 ==
Having agreed to pass the Union with England Act, the Parliament of Scotland 'adjourned' on 25 March 1707. The new united Kingdom of Great Britain came into being on 1 May 1707, with a single Parliament of Great Britain which merged the parliamentary bodies and constituencies of England and Scotland into a new legislature located in London. The post of Secretary of State for Scotland existed after 1707 until the Jacobite rising of 1745. Thereafter, responsibility for Scotland lay primarily with the office of the Secretary of State for the Northern Department, usually exercised by the Lord Advocate. The Secretaries of State were reorganised in 1782, and the duties now came under the Secretary of State for the Home Department.

=== Administrative devolution (1885) ===
1885 saw the creation of the Scottish Office and the post of Secretary for Scotland. From 1892 the Secretary for Scotland sat in cabinet, but the position was not officially recognised as a full member of the cabinet of the United Kingdom until the Secretary for Scotland post was upgraded to full Secretary of State rank as Secretary of State for Scotland in 1926.

=== Government of Scotland Bill 1913 ===
In May 1913 the House of Commons passed the second reading of the Government of Scotland Bill 1913 (also referred to as the Scottish Home Rule Bill) by 204 votes to 159. The bill was supported by Liberals and opposed by Unionists. It did not proceed further due to the outbreak of the First World War.

=== Scottish Covenant Association (1940s and 1950s) ===
The Scottish Covenant Association was a non-partisan political organisation that sought the establishment of a devolved Scottish Assembly. It was formed by John MacCormick who had left the Scottish National Party in 1942 when they decided to support all-out independence for Scotland rather than devolution as had been their position.

The Association was responsible for the creation of the Scottish Covenant, which gathered two million signatures in support of devolution. Members of the organisation were also responsible for the removal of the Stone of Destiny from Westminster Abbey in 1950 that attracted huge publicity for the cause of Scottish home rule.

=== 1979 devolution referendum ===
The Scottish referendum of 1979 was a post-legislative referendum to decide whether there was sufficient support for the Scotland Act 1978 that was to create a deliberative assembly for Scotland. The Act required that for the Act to be repealed, less than 40% of the electorate would have to vote no in the referendum. The referendum resulted in a narrow Yes majority but fell short of the 40% requirement.

=== 1997 devolution referendum ===
The Scottish devolution referendum of 1997 was a pre-legislative referendum over whether there was support for the creation of a Scottish Parliament within the United Kingdom and whether there was support for such a parliament to have tax varying powers. In response to the clear majority voting for both proposals, the United Kingdom Parliament passed the Scotland Act 1998, creating the Scottish Parliament and Scottish Executive.

=== The Scotland Act 1998 ===
The Act was introduced by the Labour government in 1998 after the 1997 referendum. It created the Scottish Parliament, setting out how Members of the Scottish Parliament are to be elected, making some provision about the internal operation of the Parliament (although many issues are left for the Parliament itself to regulate) and setting out the process for the Parliament to consider and pass Bills which become Acts of the Scottish Parliament once they receive Royal assent. The Act specifically asserts the continued power of the UK Parliament to legislate in respect of Scotland.

The Act devolves all powers except over matter it specifies as reserved matters. It further designates a list of statutes which are not amenable to amendment or repeal by the Parliament which includes the Human Rights Act 1998 and many provisions of the Scotland Act itself. Even when acting within its legislative competence, the Act further constrains the powers of the Parliament by inhibiting it from acting in a manner incompatible with the European Convention on Human Rights or European Community law. The same constraints apply to acts of the Scottish Executive.

== Scottish Parliament established, May 1999 ==
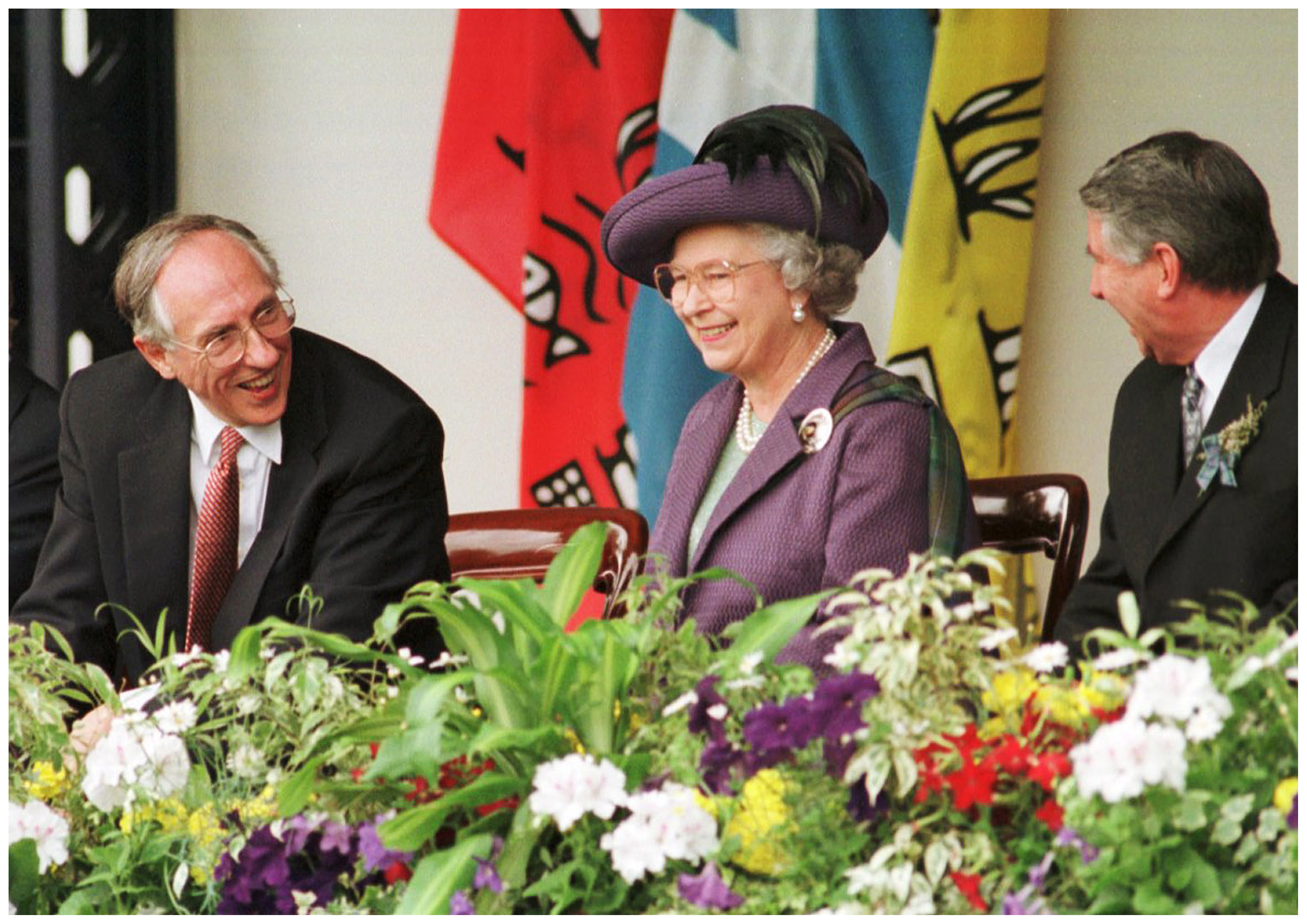
First Minister Donald Dewar with Queen Elizabeth II at the opening of the Scottish Parliament, May 1999

The Scottish Parliament met for the first time on 12 May 1999 and began its first session with SNP member Winnie Ewing stating "the Scottish Parliament, adjourned on 25th day of March in the year 1707, is hereby reconvened"

=== Opening of new Scottish Parliament building (2004) ===
Construction of the Scottish Parliament building began in June 1999 and the first debate in the new building was held on Tuesday 7 September 2004. The formal opening by the Queen took place on 9 October 2004. Enric Miralles, the Spanish architect who designed the building, died before its completion.

From 1999 until the opening of the new building in 2004, committee rooms and the debating chamber of the Scottish Parliament were housed in the General Assembly Hall of the Church of Scotland located on The Mound in Edinburgh. Office and administrative accommodation in support of the Parliament were provided in buildings leased from the City of Edinburgh Council. The new Scottish Parliament Building brought together these different elements into one purpose built parliamentary complex, housing 129 MSPs and more than 1,000 staff and civil servants.

The building aims to conceive a poetic union between the Scottish landscape, its people, its culture and the city of Edinburgh, an approach that won the parliament building numerous awards including the 2005 Stirling Prize, and it has been described as "a tour de force of arts and crafts and quality without parallel in the last 100 years of British architecture".

=== Powers over Scottish railways transferred (2005) ===
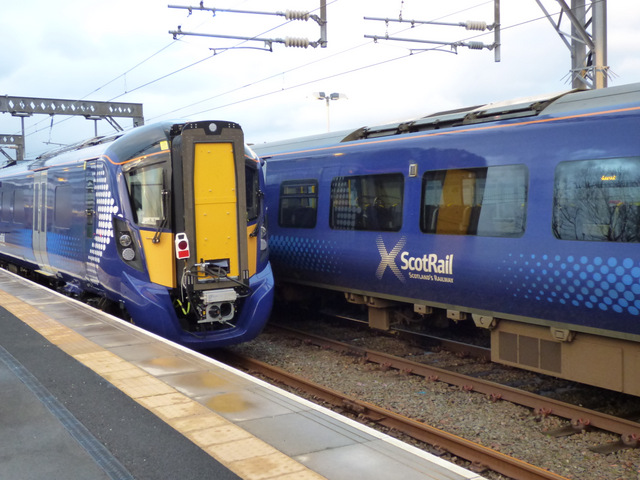
Further powers over Scotland's railway system were devolved under the Railways Act 2005 to the Scottish Parliament

As a result of provisions in the Railways Bill, powers were transferred from the Department of Transport to the Scottish Executive, a move described by then First Minister, Jack McConnell as "...the most significant devolution of new powers to Scottish ministers since 1999."

=== Scottish Executive becomes Scottish Government (2007) ===
A Scottish Executive was created under section 44 of the Scotland Act 1998. Following the 2007 Scottish Parliament election, the Scottish Executive was rebranded as the Scottish Government by the new Scottish National Party administration. Other changes that took place at this time included the development of the National Performance Framework and major restructuring whereby Directors-General were put in charge of the achievement of the Government's strategic objectives. These changes have been described as developing a form of strategic state. The new name's use in Westminster legislation was updated by s.12 Scotland Act 2012.

=== Calman Commission (2007) ===
The Calman Commission was established by a motion passed by the Scottish Parliament on 6 December 2007. Its terms of reference are: "To review the provisions of the Scotland Act 1998 in the light of experience and to recommend any changes to the present constitutional arrangements that would enable the Scottish Parliament to better serve the people of Scotland, that would improve the financial accountability of the Scottish Parliament and that would continue to secure the position of Scotland within the United Kingdom." However, concerns have been expressed that its final report will not have "much legitimacy" because it was skewed towards preserving the status quo.

=== Powers transferred over planning and nature conservation matters at sea (2008) ===
During 2008, agreement was reached to transfer responsibility for all planning and nature conservation matters at sea up to 200 miles from the Scottish coast to the Scottish Government. The change has implications for the offshore industry, wind and wave power and to a lesser extent, fishing, though responsibility for fishing quotas remains a European Union issue and oil and gas licensing and permitting remains a reserved matter.

=== Independence referendum ===
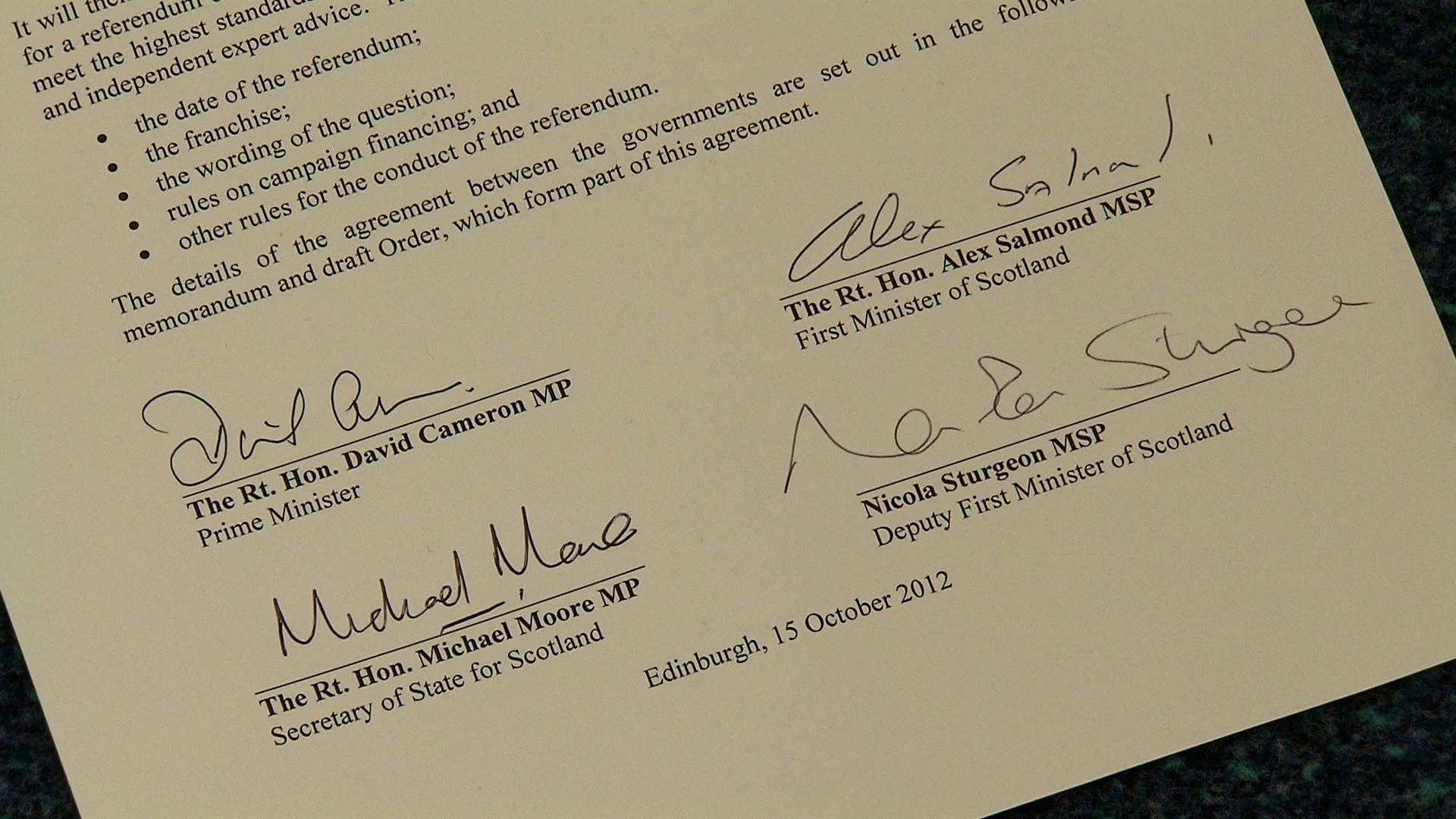
The signatures of the Edinburgh Agreement, the legislation that granted powers to the Scottish Parliament to hold a referendum on independence in 2014

In August 2009, the SNP announced a Referendum Bill would be included in its package of bills to be debated before Parliament in 2009–10, with the intention of holding a referendum on the issues of Scottish independence in November 2010. The bill did not pass due to the SNP's status as a minority administration, and due to the initial opposition to the Bill from all other major parties in the Scottish Parliament.

Following the 2011 Scottish Parliament election, the SNP had a majority in parliament and again brought forward an Independence Referendum Bill. The Scottish Government also suggested that full fiscal autonomy for Scotland (known as "devo-max") could be an alternative option in the vote. The negotiation of the Edinburgh Agreement (2012) resulted in the UK government legislating to provide the Scottish Parliament with the powers to hold the referendum. The "devo-max" option was not included, however, as the Edinburgh Agreement stipulated that the referendum had to be a clear binary choice between independence or the existing devolution arrangements. The Scottish Independence Referendum (Franchise) Act 2013 was passed by the Scottish Parliament and campaigning commenced. Two days before the referendum was held, with polls very close, the leaders of the three main UK political parties made "The Vow", a public pledge to devolve "extensive new powers" to the Scottish Parliament if independence was rejected. They also agreed to a devolution timetable proposed by Gordon Brown.

After heavy campaigning by both sides, voting took place on 18 September 2014. Independence was rejected by a margin of 45% in favour to 55% against.

=== Smith Commission ===
The day after the referendum, David Cameron announced the formation of the Smith Commission to "convene cross-party talks" concerning "recommendations for further devolution of powers to the Scottish Parliament". Two months later, on 27 November 2014, the commission published its recommendations, which included giving the Scottish Parliament complete power to set income tax rates and bands, increased borrowing powers, and an extensive list of other rights and powers.

=== Scotland Act 2016 ===
Based on the Smith Commission's recommendations, the Scotland Act 2016 was passed by Parliament and received Royal Assent on 23 March 2016. The Act set out amendments to the Scotland Act 1998 and devolved further powers to Scotland, most notably:

- The ability to amend sections of the Scotland Act 1998 which relate to the operation of the Scottish Parliament and the Scottish Government within the United Kingdom including control of its electoral system (subject to a two-thirds majority within the parliament for any proposed change)
- Legislative control over areas such as onshore oil and gas extraction, rail franchising, consumer advocacy and advice amongst others by devolution of powers in relation to these fields to the Scottish Parliament and the Scottish Ministers.
- Management of the Crown Estate (followed up by the Scottish Crown Estate Act 2019) and the British Transport Police in Scotland
- Control over certain and removable taxes including Air Passenger Duty
- Full control over Scottish income tax including Income Tax rates and bands on non-savings and non-dividend income

The Act recognised the Scottish Parliament and a Scottish Government as permanent among UK's constitutional arrangements, with a referendum required before either can be abolished.

=== United Kingdom Internal Market Act 2020 ===
After the 2016 European Union Referendum, the UK government introduced a number of pieces of legislation in areas of trade previously governed by EU law. A key act is the United Kingdom Internal Market Act 2020. It is intended to restrict the legislative powers of the devolved administrations in economic, environmental, and public health policy, and to prevent internal trade barriers within the UK. It constrains the Scottish Parliament's ability to regulate goods and services, and by doing so undermines devolution. The act allows UK ministers to spend on policies in devolved regions without the approval of the devolved parliament.

== Proposed further devolution ==
=== SNP proposals ===
In April 2015 the SNP released a manifesto citing aspirations for further devolution than outlined by the Smith Commission with the devolution of corporation tax, National Insurance Contributions (NICs), and the welfare system. Full fiscal autonomy was also a medium-term goal. First minister Nicola Sturgeon added the following month that she would prioritise the devolution of “employment policy, including the minimum wage, welfare, business taxes, national insurance and equality policy.”

In July 2015 SNP ministers called for the devolution of broadcasting to Scotland. The Scottish Trades Union Congress (STUC) had also proposed to the Smith Commission that broadcasting be devolved for Scotland. A 2014 opinion poll by What Scotland Thinks showed 54% in favour with 30% opposed.

The SNP's 2019 general election manifesto called for the devolution of the following:

- Misuse of Drugs Act, so that Scotland could employ “the full range of effective public health measures” to tackle drug addiction
- migration powers for a system that "works" for the Scottish economy and society
- employment law to "protect workers’ rights, increase the living wage and end the age discrimination of the statutory living wage"
- devolution of tax powers
- powers over consumer protection
- greater devolution of gambling regulation
- Scottish parliament gender balance including quotas

In December 2022, SNP employment minister Richard Lochhead called for the replacement EU funding (UK Shared Prosperity Fund) to be fully devolved to allow "funding to flow to regions and communities in line with shared Scottish policies.”

In April 2023, the SNP called for the devolution of energy powers. The Scottish parliament has control over planning regulations which can affect renewable power, but the majority of energy powers are retained with Westminster.

In October 2023, SNP MP David Linden brought forward a bill to devolve employment law to the Scottish Parliament. The SNP did not expect the bill to pass, wanting to “expose” Labour’s position on the matter. In the same month, the SNP also called for the devolution of inheritance tax.

=== Labour proposals ===
Keir Starmer, former leader of the UK Labour Party was in favour of reforming the UK and has promised to do so "quickly" if a UK Labour government is elected. Starmer has also tasked Gordon Brown, former prime minister of the UK with heading a "Constitution Commission" which would form in the event of a Labour UK government. Gordon Brown has suggested federalism as a viable option following Brexit and according to former Tory MSP Adam Tomkins, Gordon Brown wants "a reformed Britain, a new federal settlement, and further powers for a supercharged Holyrood".

Brown proposed the following in 2017:

- Devolution of formerly EU regulated matters; agriculture, fisheries, environmental regulation and areas of employment and energy
- Control over £800 million European Structural and Investment funds
- State aid regional policy
- Devolution of VAT rates
- Ability to make treaties with other countries in devolved areas

However, the Labour "New Britain" report outlined the following in December 2022:

- Ability of Scottish parliament to enter into agreements with international bodies on devolved matters
- The devolution of the job centre administration
- New, statutory, formulation of the Sewel convention, which should be legally binding, providing similar constitutional codification as states and provinces in federal countries.
- A "solidarity clause” under which to ensure the commitment of all the governments in the UK to work together
- Establishment of a Council of the Nations and Regions to replace the "dysfunctional" Joint Ministerial Committees
- A second chamber of Parliament, reforming the House of Lords and acting as an Assembly of the Nations and Regions

== Changes enacted by the UK parliament ==
In December 2022, the Gender Recognition Reform Bill was passed by the Scottish parliament. In January 2023, Scottish Secretary Alister Jack used powers included in the Section 35 of the Scotland Act 1998 to block the bill from receiving royal assent and becoming law.

== See also ==
- Scottish Social Attitudes Survey
- Scottish Constitutional Convention
- Constitutional status of Orkney, Shetland and the Western Isles
- Devolution in the United Kingdom
- Welsh devolution
