= Barnett formula =

Public spending distribution to the devolved administrations in the UK

The Barnett formula is a mechanism used by the Treasury in the United Kingdom to automatically adjust the amounts of public expenditure allocated to Northern Ireland, Scotland and Wales to reflect changes in spending levels allocated to public services in England, Scotland and Wales, as appropriate. The formula applies to a large proportion, but not the whole, of the devolved governments' budgets − in 2013–14 it applied to about 85% of the Scottish Parliament's total budget. The formula has been adjusted in recent times to take account of increased tax and welfare powers being devolved, particularly in Scotland, to take account of greater control over revenue raised from devolved taxes being allocated to public spending. By July 2025, around 50% of Scottish Government spending is generated through devolved taxation in Scotland in contrast to the main source of revenue for public spending in Scotland in 2013–2014 coming from Barnett formula allocation.

The formula is named after Joel Barnett, who devised it in 1978 while Chief Secretary to the Treasury, as a short-term solution to resolve minor Cabinet disputes in the run-up to the 1979 devolution referendums in Scotland and Wales.

The Barnett formula is said to have "no legal standing or democratic justification", and, being merely a convention, could be changed at will by the Treasury. Barnett himself later called a 2014 pledge to continue using it a "terrible mistake". In 2009, the House of Lords Select Committee on the Barnett Formula concluded that "the Barnett Formula should no longer be used to determine annual increases in the block grant for the United Kingdom's devolved administrations... A new system which allocates resources to the devolved administrations based on an explicit assessment of their relative needs should be introduced."

During the 2014 Scottish independence referendum, the Barnett formula came to widespread attention given Scotland's higher levels of public expenditure.

== Calculation ==
Its principle is that any increase or reduction in expenditure in England will automatically lead to a proportionate increase or reduction in resources for the devolved governments in Wales, Scotland and Northern Ireland. Analogous arrangements apply to categories of expense which are only controlled by some of the devolved governments. The formula is not applied to all public expenditure, but is the default option if no other decisions are made. Expenditure is allocated en bloc, not by service, allowing each devolved administration to allocate these funds as it believes appropriate.

For areas of funding where the corresponding central government department funding covers England only, for example education and health, the formula for funding to Scotland, Wales and Northern Ireland consists of a baseline plus increases based on the increases in public spending in England in comparable programmes, applied in proportion to current populations:

Extra funding in Scotland, Wales or Northern Ireland
=
Extra funding in England
×
Population proportion compared to England
×
The extent to which the relevant English departmental programme is comparable with the services carried out by the devolved administration

For example, in 2000, the Northern Irish, Scottish and Welsh populations were taken to be 3.69%, 10.34% and 5.93% (respectively) of the population of the United Kingdom (comprising England, Scotland, Wales and Northern Ireland). For programmes in the Department of Health, the comparability factor for Scotland and Wales was 99.7%. Therefore, if £1 billion was to be added to planned health expenditure in England, then the extra amount added to the Scottish block, compared to the year before, would be £1bn x 10.34% x 99.7% = £103 million, and the amount added to the Welsh block would be £1bn x 5.93% x 99.7% = £59.1 million.

For areas of funding where the corresponding central government department funding covers England and Wales, such as the Home Office and legal departments, the formula for funding to Scotland and Northern Ireland consists of a baseline plus increases based on the increases in public spending in England and Wales in comparable programmes, applied in proportion to current populations:

Extra funding in Scotland or Northern Ireland
=
Extra funding in England and Wales
×
Population proportion compared to England and Wales
×
The extent to which the relevant English and Welsh departmental programme is comparable with the services carried out by the devolved administration

For areas of funding where the corresponding central government department funding covers England, Wales and Scotland, such as Work and Pensions, the formula for funding to Northern Ireland consists of a baseline plus increases based on the increases in public spending in England, Wales and Scotland in comparable programmes, applied in proportion to current populations:

Extra funding in Northern Ireland
=
Extra funding in England, Wales and Scotland
×
Population proportion compared to England, Wales and Scotland
×
The extent to which the relevant English, Welsh and Scottish departmental programme is comparable with the services carried out by the devolved administration

When additional public expenditure is planned in England, the corresponding additions which are made to the devolved administrations' funding allocations are referred to as "Barnett consequentials". For example, the 2011 Autumn Statement allocated additional funds to aid supply-side reform in the economy aimed at encouraging investment and export growth, noting that where expenditure was undertaken in England, "the devolved administrations [would] receive Barnett consequestials (sic) to invest in their key infrastructure priorities".

=== Proportional to population ===
The ultimate predecessor of the formula was the 1888 Goschen formula, introduced by George Goschen when Chancellor of the Exchequer, as part of the proposals for Irish Home Rule. This allocated 80% of funding to England and Wales, 11% to Scotland and 9% to Ireland; hence the Scottish share was 13.75% of the English/Welsh amount.

By 1970, in preparation for devolution, changes in the relative populations were examined. By then the relative populations were 85% in England and 10% in Scotland, meaning that the new Barnett formula set changes to Scottish expenditure at 10/85th of the change in England (or 11.76%), 2% lower than the change that was being received under Goschen. The population percentages have been recalculated annually since 1999, and the Scottish share of changes was in 2002 set at 10.23% of the English amount.

The original calculation was based on incorrect population estimates, and no attempt was made to adjust the baseline for these errors though changes in expenditure are based on more current population numbers.

Political unwillingness to manage the task of making the changes necessary to rebalance existing expenditure meant that the Barnett formula was applied only to changes. Nevertheless, the expectation was that as inflation led to repeated application of the formula, average expenditure per head on devolved services in Scotland would over the years fall nearer and nearer to the English figure (the so-called "Barnett squeeze").

Details of the funding arrangement can be found in HM Treasury's Statement of Funding Policy.

== Public expenditure by nation ==
Estimates of government spend by region are given in HM Treasury's annual publication Public Expenditure Statistical Analyses (PESA). These estimates of the spend per person have consistently shown highest levels of spending in Northern Ireland, followed by Scotland, then Wales, and finally England. For example:

Year	Definition	£ per head (Brackets: % of UK average)				
Year	Definition	UK average	England	Scotland	Wales	Northern Ireland
1985–86	Total identifiable expenditure by country	2,109	2,019 (95.7)	2,562 (121.5)	2,231 (105.8)	3,108 (147.4)
1993–94	Total identifiable expenditure by country	3,769	3,621 (96.1)	4,485 (119.0)	4,258 (113.0)	5,059 (134.2)
2000–01	Total identifiable expenditure by country	4,709	4,529 (96.2)	5,558 (118.0)	5,302 (112.6)	6,424 (136.4)
2005–06	Total identifiable expenditure on services by country	7,049	6,835 (97.0)	8,179 (116.0)	7,784 (110.4)	8,713 (123.6)
2012–13	Total identifiable expenditure on services by country	8,788	8,529 (97.1)	10,152 (115.5)	9,709 (110.5)	10,876 (123.8)
2015–16	Total identifiable expenditure on services by country	9,076	8,816 (97.1)	10,536 (116.1)	9,996 (110.1)	10,983 (121.0)
2018-19	Total identifiable expenditure on services by country	9,584	9,296 (97.0)	11,242 (117.3)	10,656 (111.2)	11,590 (120.9)

The persistence of per capita public expenditure being lower in England than the other regions continues to attract calls for the formula to be renegotiated.

As these variations were not ever a consciously decided policy of the Treasury or Parliament, this inequality has been cited as a reason for reform. Moreover, the erosion of these differences over time has been very slow and uneven. The change in Scottish identifiable expenditure as a percentage of English expenditure from 2001/02 to 2012/13 was 121.3% to 119.0%. Previous estimates that these differences would disappear in 30 years now appear unlikely.

The average UK total identifiable expenditure on services is approximately £8,788. Instant abolition of the Barnett formula, and adjustment of the four countries' spend to this average would result in a large decrease for each person in Scotland, Wales and Northern Ireland, but an increase of about 3% per person for England.

Although not subject to the Barnett formula, there are also significant variations in identifiable spending between the regions of England, in 2012/13 ranging from £7,638 in the South East (87% of the UK average), to £9,435 in London (107%).

=== Based on need ===
As noted below, no account is made of the amounts raised by taxation in each of the home nations, nor the relevant fiscal need (based on factors such as sparsity of population, cost of travel, unemployment rates, health, age distribution of the population, road lengths, recorded crimes, and numbers of sub-standard dwellings) in each area. The Barnett formula never claimed to address these issues and was a basic calculation on the basis of proportions of the population.

A needs assessment study was undertaken by the Treasury in 1979 in preparation for planned devolution, to assess the relative needs just with respect to the policy areas which were to be devolved (i.e. excluding non-devolved government spending such as social security). This study was updated in 1993. Both studies found the highest need for devolved services in Northern Ireland, followed by Scotland, then Wales, and finally England. In 1979, Northern Ireland and Scotland received more to spend on services which would have been devolved than the needs assessment suggested they should, and Wales less. By 1993, all three countries had increased the gap between the needs assessment and actual spend. However, this does not necessarily reflect the total need and spend, including non-devolved services.

A needs assessment was carried out by the Independent Commission n Funding and Finance for Wales (2010), established by the Welsh government. It used the allocation formula employed by the UK government for English regions and applied them to Wales, determining that Wales was then receiving some 3 per cent less spending per head than it would receive if treated as an English region. The Commission modelled the allocations with a regression formula and applied this to Scotland and Northern Ireland. Northern Ireland was found to be funded roughly appropriately, perhaps a percent or two above the consistent level but Scotland was receiving disproportionate expenditures - some 125 percent of English expenditure per head, whereas if treated as an English region it would receive 108 per cent.

UK Treasury needs assessment studies of spending per capita on "devolved services" (in index terms)
Definition	England	Scotland	Wales	Northern Ireland
Actual spend in 1976–77	100	122	106	135
Recommended spend in 1979 Needs Assessment	100	116	109	131
Actual spend in 1993–94	100	133	122	127
Recommended spend in 1993 Needs Assessment	100	115	112	122

Barnett was to eventually view the formula that he devised as unfair. In The Scotsman in January 2004 he wrote, "It was never meant to last this long, but it has gone on and on and it has become increasingly unfair to the regions of England. I didn't create this formula to give Scotland an advantage over the rest of the country when it comes to public funding."

According to Scotland on Sunday, moving to a needs-based allocation of government finances would cost Scotland around £2.5 billion a year, but the Audit Commission (for England and Wales) concluded in a 1993 report that "needs assessment can never be perfect or fair."

== Funding mechanism ==
Since devolution, once levels of funding for Scotland, Wales and Northern Ireland have been determined by central government in a spending review using the Barnett formula, the UK Parliament votes the necessary provision to the Secretaries of State for Scotland, Wales and Northern Ireland as part of their central government departments' Departmental Expenditure Limits (DEL). The secretaries of state then make payments to the devolved administrations from the DEL as block grants, which means that they can be spent by the devolved legislatures on any devolved responsibility however they see fit.

In 2011–12, the Scotland Office Total DEL outturn was £27.567bn, and from this the block grant to the Scottish Parliament was £26.985bn. The Wales Office Total DEL outturn was £14.625bn, and the Northern Ireland Office Total DEL outturn was £10.465bn.

The Barnett formula only applies to the devolved administrations' expenditure classified within DEL, which for Scotland is about 85% of the Scottish Parliament's total budget. Other sources of income for the devolved administrations include:

- The Annually Managed Expenditure (AME) portion of the grant from central Government. (AME is demand-led funding not subject to limits, e.g. student loans. AME can only be allocated by the devolved administration to the purpose for which it is assigned. Further AME can be drawn from HM Treasury if required, while any unspent AME is returned.)
- Scottish Variable Rate of Income Tax
- Borrowing
- The Northern Ireland Regional Rate

== Controversy ==
The Barnett formula is widely recognised as being controversial but there is no consensus on how to change it.

1. It takes no account of different needs or different costs in different areas.
2. It does not affect existing levels of public expenditure, even if relative population shares change.
3. Since existing levels of public expenditure are not allocated in proportion to population, a particular expenditure decision will lead to different percentage changes in different areas.
4. It takes no account of different amounts of tax paid in respect of different areas or of changes in these amounts.
5. It does not apply to divisions of expenditure between the different regions of England.
6. Neither the Barnett formula nor needs-based spending is incentive-compatible, so neither plan would give the territories any fiscal incentive to become more productive.

=== English criticisms ===
Taxation and charges applied in only one nation or region controversially affect the Barnett formula. In one example, the top-up tuition fees introduced in England are counted as additional English public expenditure (as the extra income is spent by the universities) and, therefore, an equivalent amount from the Consolidated Fund, paid for by UK-wide taxation, has been transferred to the Scottish Government. It was argued that this meant that only the English paid tuition fees, yet this money is shared with Scottish universities, despite Scottish students studying at those universities not having to contribute any extra fees.

In contrast, if the Scottish Parliament were to use its tax-adjusting powers, the additional (or reduced) revenue would not be considered in any calculations by the Barnett formula of the block grant for Scotland.

Another criticism is despite at times England's fiscal balance almost being in balance between tax and spending, it's still liable for debts incurred at a UK level for borrowing almost entirely incurred for the devolved nations.

=== Northern Irish, Scottish and Welsh criticisms ===
In 2007, the UK Government decided that there would be no Barnett consequentials in relation to the more than £7bn of public spending allocated to deliver the 2012 London Olympic Games, despite the fact that a substantial proportion of this spending was to be used to fund regeneration and transport infrastructure in the east London area.

The lack of a statutory basis for the formula concerns Northern Irish, Scottish and Welsh citizens. The devolution legislation states only that the Secretary of State for each country will make a grant of such monies as Parliament makes available. This is seen as relying too heavily on the good will of the Westminster Parliament, and infringing the independence of the devolved executives.

A needs-based solution has been suggested as being more fair, especially considering areas of England are not taken into account or compared to the three devolved nations of the UK.

In Northern Ireland, there has been no review of the mechanisms involved in regard to devolving of fiscal power and responsibilities – unlike Wales with the Commission on Devolution in Wales, Scotland with the Scotland Act 2012, and England with the Heseltine Growth Review. The Silk Commission in Wales was expressly excluded from considering the Barnett Formula, which, following the earlier report of the Independent Commission on Funding and Finance for Wales, was reserved for bilateral negotiation between the two governments, The original formula has the effect when public expenditure is growing of very gradually reducing the relative share of countries with higher spending per head than England. Since at the time of its report Wales received less than equivalent English regions, the Commission proposed a floor to the Barnett formula to limit any further squeeze in the Welsh case. This proposal was eventually accepted and the Act of 2017 instituted a floor which ensured Welsh expenditure per head would not fall below 115 per cent of the English level. At the present time no such floor exists for the other devolved administrations although it has now become a matter of debate in the case of Northern Ireland.

The Northern Ireland Council for Voluntary Action highlighted problems with the current system, key of which have been the potential to make corporation tax more attractive for investment, and that the formula favours Scotland much more strongly than it does Wales or Northern Ireland.

The Scottish National Party pointed to what has been termed the Barnett squeeze. They point out that rather than protecting the favourable spending position of Scotland, the Barnett formula steadily erodes that advantage: As it gives equal cash increases (per head), and Scotland's per head spending is higher than England's, Scotland's increases will be smaller as a percentage of their total budget than England's. For example, if a 4% increase is needed to cover inflation, the same cash increase which provides a 4% increase for England may translate into an increase of only 3% of Scotland's budget – after inflation, that would mean a 1% budget reduction for the Scottish Government. Opponents of that view claim that these are not cutbacks, merely lower growth, and that spending convergence between the home nations is not a policy objective of the current UK Government or Scottish Government. Also, in reality this erosion has happened extremely slowly − as shown in the table above, Scotland's reduction in identifiable spend per head from 121.5% of the UK average to 115.5% took nearly 30 years.

== Options for change ==
In 2009, the House of Lords Select Committee on the Barnett Formula concluded that, "A new system which allocates resources to the devolved administrations based on an explicit assessment of their relative needs should be introduced."

The Scottish Liberal Democrats commissioned Lord Steel of Aikwood to investigate what options existed for changing the present arrangement. The report of the Steel commission was published on 6 March 2006 and called for greater fiscal powers for the Scottish Government, similar to the Common Purse Agreement that exists for the Manx Government.

The Scottish National Party proposed Full Fiscal Autonomy for Scotland which would have given the Scottish parliament full control of Scottish taxation, the result of which would have been a reversal in funding with the Scottish parliament paying the UK government a grant to cover the Scottish share of reserved issue spending. This option was rejected by the UK parliament.

== See also ==
- Equalization payments
- Government Expenditure and Revenue Scotland
- Government spending in the United Kingdom
- Power of the purse
- Scottish budget
- Scottish Consolidated Fund
- Union dividend
