= Smith Commission =

Cameron-era government body on Scottish devolution

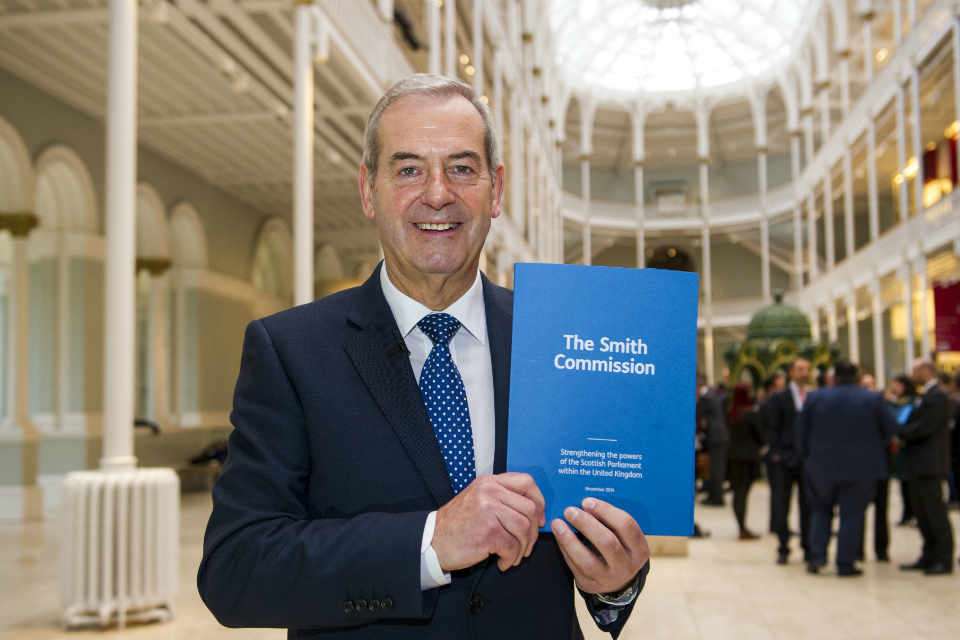
Lord Smith of Kelvin holding the Commission's report

The Smith Commission was announced by Prime Minister David Cameron on 19 September 2014 in the wake of the 'No' vote in the 2014 Scottish independence referendum. The establishment of the commission was part of the process of fulfilling The Vow made by the leaders of the three main unionist parties during the last days of the referendum campaign. The Vow promised the devolution of more powers from the Parliament of the United Kingdom to the Scottish Parliament in the event of a No vote.

Following the No vote, Lord Smith of Kelvin was given the task to "convene cross-party talks and facilitate an inclusive engagement process across Scotland to produce, by 30 November 2014, Heads of Agreement with recommendations for further devolution of powers to the Scottish Parliament". Ten representatives were nominated by the political parties with elected members in the Scottish Parliament; the Commission started its discussions on 22 October. Agreement was reached and the report published on 27 November 2014.

Following the Conservative election victory at the 2015 General Election, the Scotland Bill 2015–16 was proposed in the first Queen's Speech, to put into effect the recommendations of the Smith Commission.

== The Vow ==
The Vow was a joint statement by the leaders of the three main unionist parties, David Cameron, Ed Miliband and Nick Clegg, promising more powers for Scotland in the event of a No vote. Included in The Vow was that in the event of a No vote:

- The Scottish Parliament would be permanent
- Extensive new devolved powers would be delivered
- The Barnett formula for funding Scottish Government expenditure would continue

The Vow was published in the Daily Record, one of the main tabloid newspapers in Scotland that also backed a No vote in the referendum. The explanation and background to the publication of The Vow was explained in the Daily Record itself one year after the referendum when it outlined that following a poll showing the 'Yes' side ahead, it was felt that firm promises of more powers were required from the 'No' side.

== Membership of Smith Commission ==
The five political parties with representation in the Scottish Parliament were each invited to nominate two representatives to the commission. Those nominated were:

Political Members of the Smith Commission
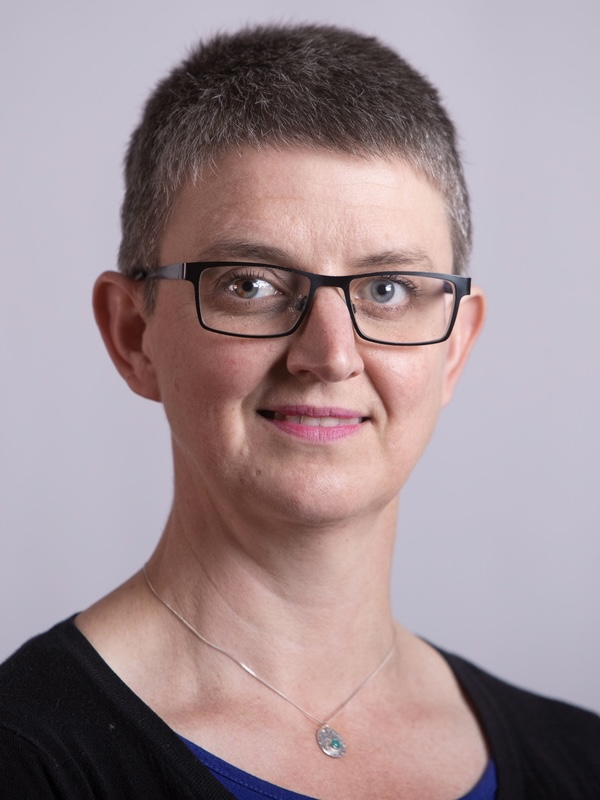
Maggie Chapman MSP
Scottish Green Party

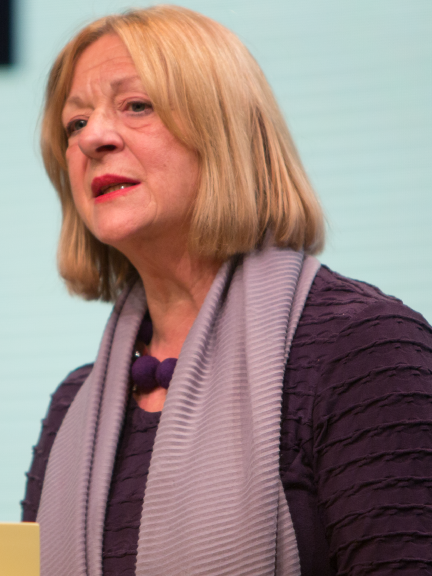
Linda Fabiani MSP
Scottish National Party

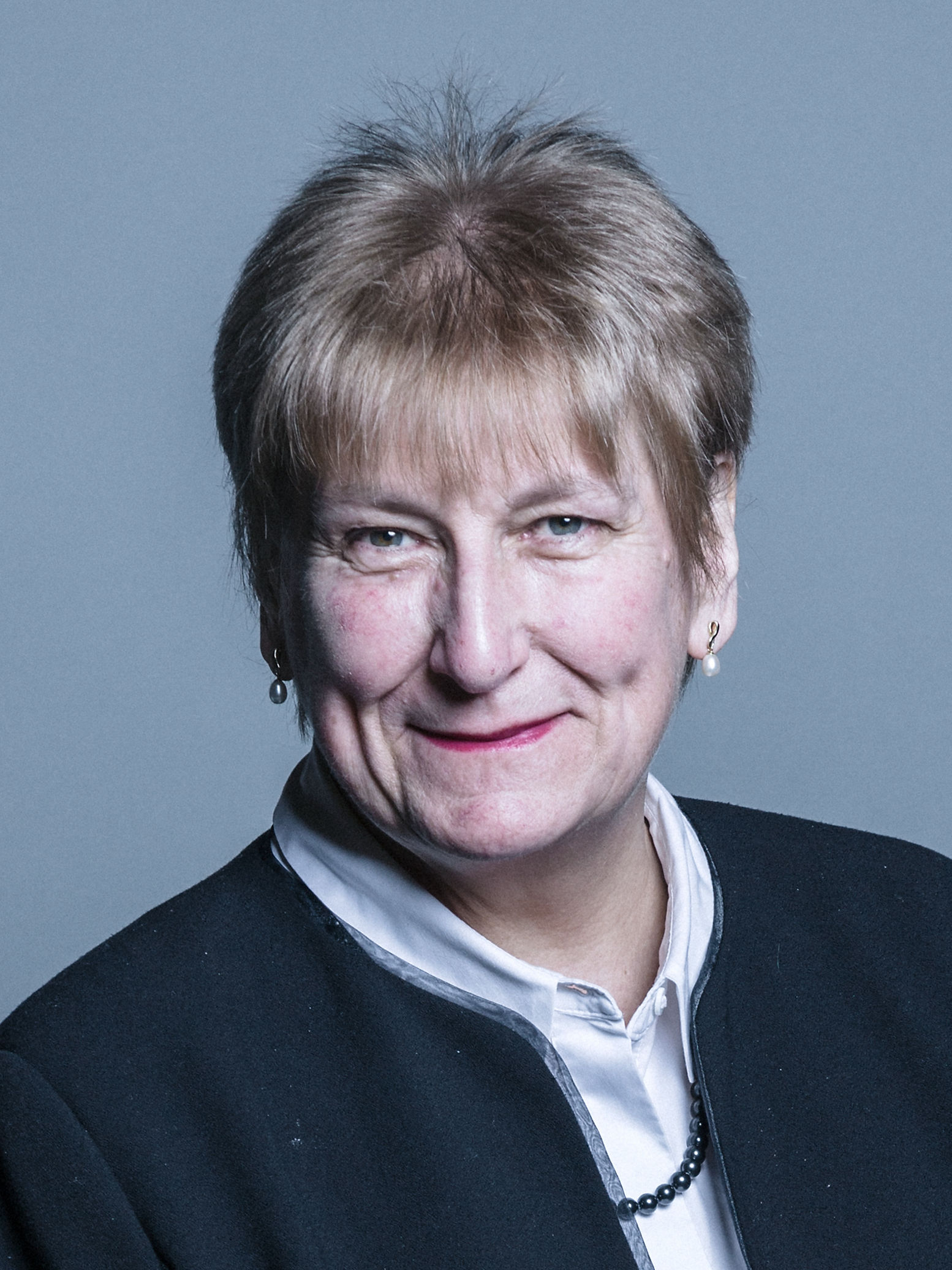
Annabel, Baroness Goldie
MSP DL
Scottish Conservatives

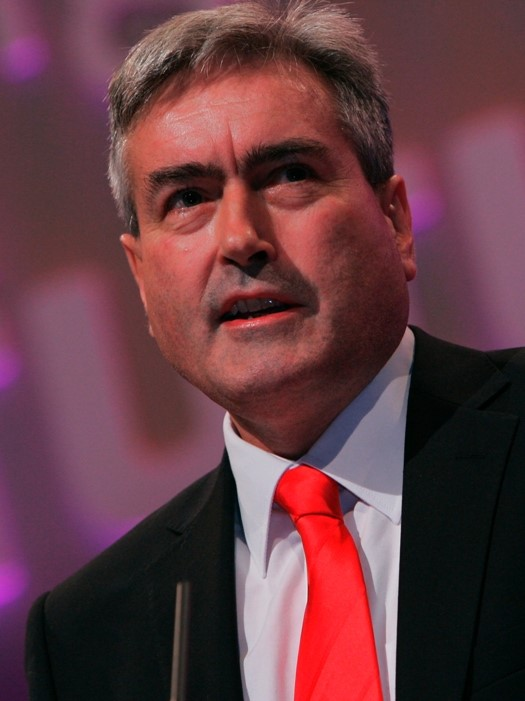
Iain Gray MSP
Scottish Labour

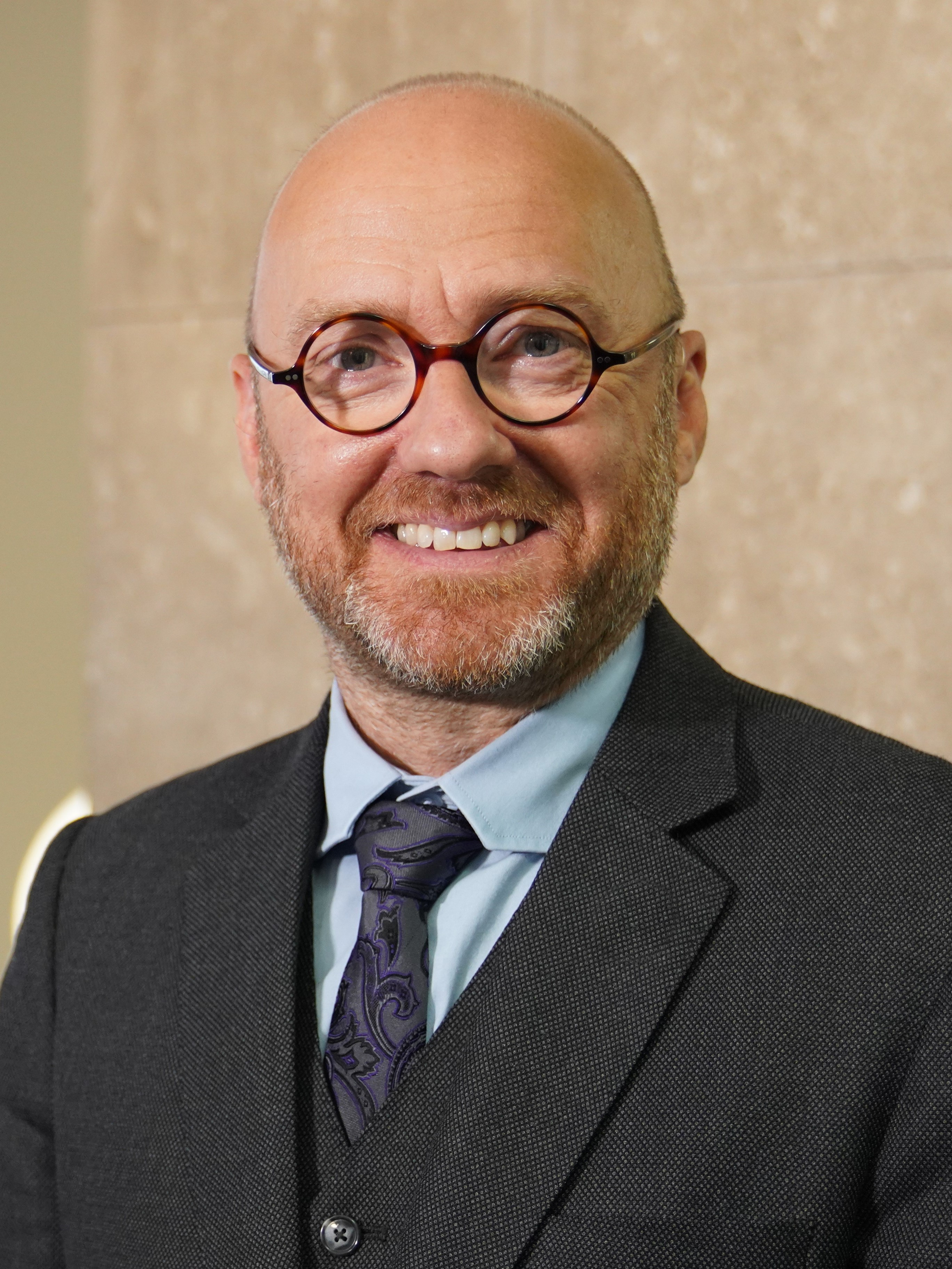
Patrick Harvie MSP
Scottish Green Party
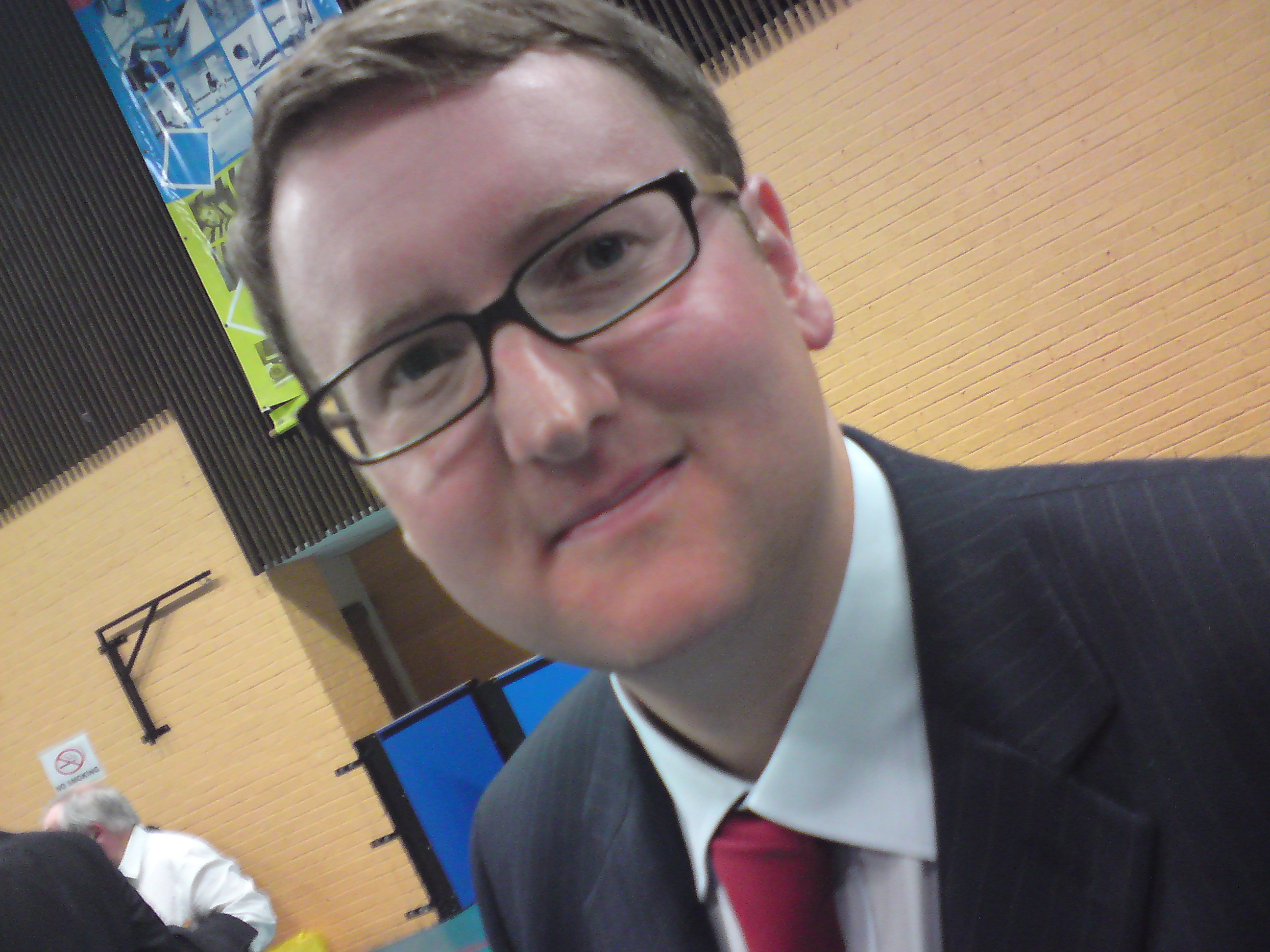
Gregg McClymont MP
Scottish Labour

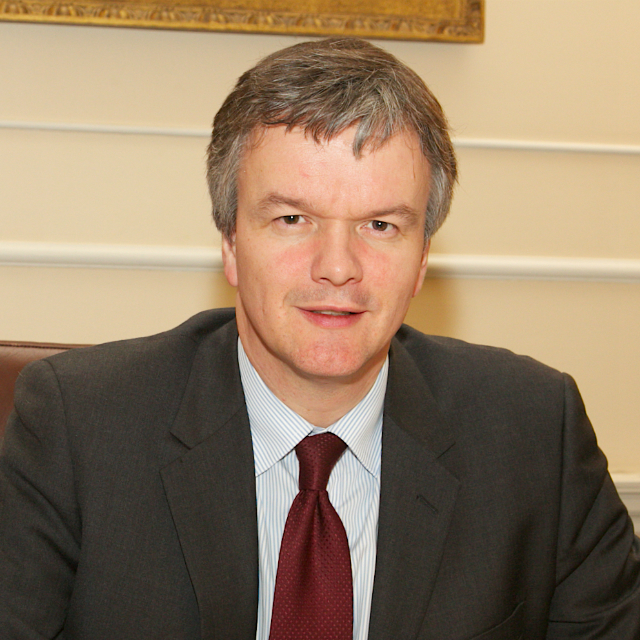
Michael Moore MP
Scottish Liberal Democrats

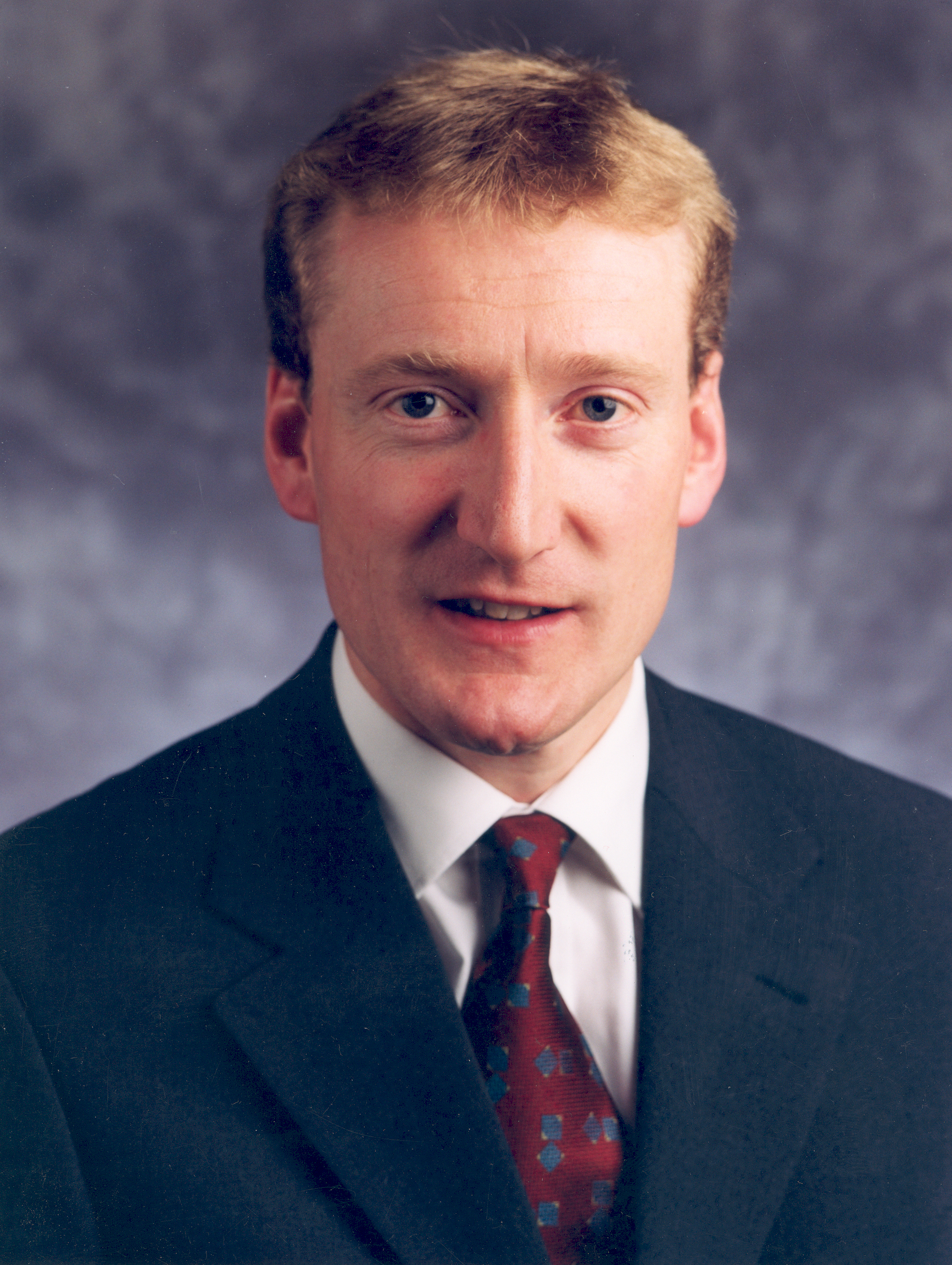
Tavish Scott MSP
Scottish Liberal Democrats

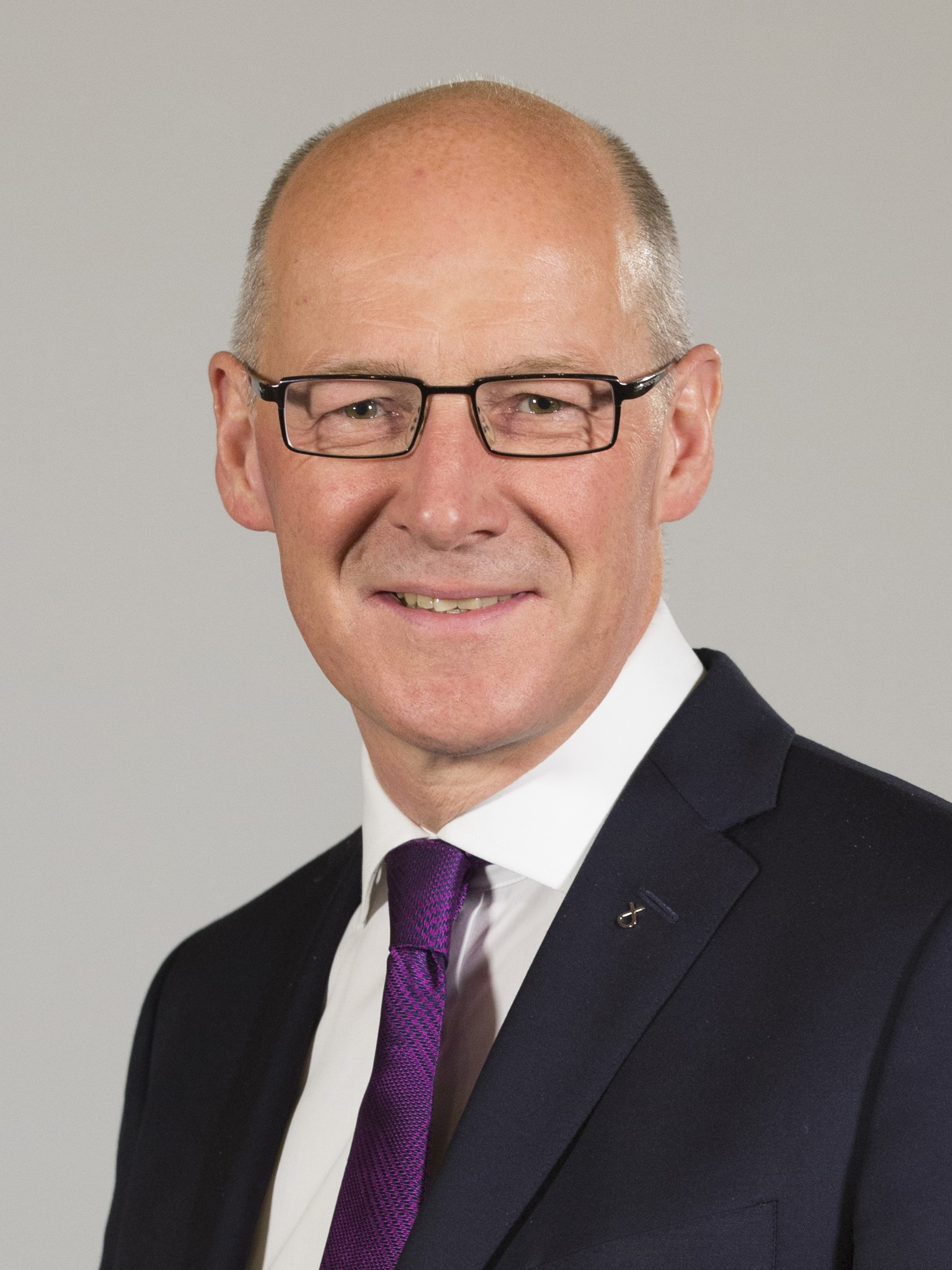
John Swinney MSP
Scottish National Party

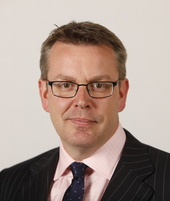
Adam Tomkins MSP
Scottish Conservatives

== Written submissions ==
The commission invited submissions from individuals and organisations before a deadline of 31 October. Approximately 14,000 emails and letters were received from the public, with a further 250 contributions from groups.

The Conservatives, Labour and Liberal Democrats, who had all supported a no vote in the referendum, each submitted proposals which were similar to the findings of commissions they had each established before the referendum. The SNP and Scottish Greens, who had supported a yes vote, called for what was described by BBC News as "devo max".

The Scottish Trades Union Congress called for the full devolution of income tax, many welfare benefits and a different immigration policy. The Institute of Chartered Accountants of Scotland pointed to the possible risks and additional administration costs caused by having different tax systems and rates.

Three Scottish airports (Edinburgh, Glasgow and Aberdeen) proposed that Air Passenger Duty (APD) should be devolved, with a view to it being abolished in Scotland. The airports cited the restrictive effect on tourism of APD, which raised about £200 million in revenue during the 2013/14 fiscal year. WWF Scotland opposed the devolution of APD in its submission, citing the growth in carbon emissions from air travel. The Scottish Government previously called for the devolution of APD in 2011, when it was devolved to Northern Ireland. This action had been taken in anticipation of a similar tax being abolished in the Republic of Ireland.

== The Smith Report ==
The report highlights three main Heads of Agreement. These are:

- Pillar 1: Providing for a durable but responsive constitutional settlement for the governance of Scotland
- Pillar 2: Delivering prosperity, a healthy economy, jobs, and social justice
- Pillar 3: Strengthening the financial responsibility of the Scottish Parliament

The following list are the issues discussed within the Heads of Agreement:

- Welfare – excluding pensions
- VAT relief for charities
- Crown Estate
- Energy
- Asylum support
- Remaining powers over transport
- Charity regulation
- Employability
- Equality law
- Consumer protection
- Employment law
- Misuse of Drugs Act
- Scottish elections and democracy
- Tax

=== Recommendations ===
On 27 November 2014 the commission published its recommendations, which included the following:

- The Scottish Parliament to have complete power to set income tax rates and bands except for the Personal Allowance and administration (which is still carried out by HMRC.)
- The Scottish Parliament to receive a proportion of the VAT collected in Scotland, amounting to the first ten percent of the standard rate (so with the current standard VAT rate of 20%, Scotland would receive 50% of the receipts). However, the Scottish Parliament would not have power to influence the UK's overall VAT rate and would not be a devolved tax.
- The Scottish Parliament to have increased borrowing powers to support capital investment and ensure budgetary stability. These powers are to be agreed with the UK government.
- UK legislation to state that the Scottish Parliament and Scottish Government are permanent institutions. The parliament will also be given powers to legislate over how it is elected and run.
- The Scottish Parliament to have power to extend the vote to 16- and 17-year-olds, allowing them to vote in the 2016 Scottish Parliament election.
- The Scottish Parliament to have control over a number of benefits including disability payments, winter fuel payments and the housing elements of Universal Credit.
- The Scottish Parliament to have new powers to make discretionary payments in any area of welfare.
- The Scottish Parliament to have control over Air Passenger Duty charged on passengers flying from airports within Scotland.
- Responsibility for the management of the Crown Estate's economic assets in Scotland, including the Crown Estate's seabed and mineral and fishing rights, and the net surplus revenue generated from these assets, to be transferred to the Scottish Parliament.
- The Scottish Government will have power to allow public sector operators to bid for rail franchises funded and specified by Scottish ministers.
- The block grant from the UK government to Scotland will continue to be determined via the operation of the Barnett formula. New rules to define how it will be adjusted at the point when powers are transferred and thereafter to be agreed by the Scottish and UK governments and put in place prior to the powers coming into force. These rules will ensure that neither the Scottish nor UK governments will lose or gain financially from the act of transferring a power.
- MPs representing constituencies across the whole of the UK to continue to decide the UK's budget, including income tax.
- The Scottish and UK governments to draw up and agree on a memorandum of understanding to ensure that devolution is not detrimental to UK-wide critical national infrastructure in relation to matters such as defence and security, immigration, trade and energy.

The commission also considered devolving the power to vary all elements of Universal Credit (rather than just its housing element) but this did not appear in the commission's final recommendations.

== Reaction ==
=== Before publication ===
In October 2014 the House of Commons Political and Constitutional Reform Committee heard evidence that was critical of the timetable set for the Smith Commission. Professor Michael Keating said he believed that the condensed timetable, which called for draft legislation by January 2015, was unrealistic. He warned of the risk that agreement would unravel because there was insufficient time to consider technical issues. Both Professor Keating and Professor Nicola McEwen said this was due to political pressures, with the unionist party leaders having vowed to grant additional powers and a United Kingdom general election due to be held on 7 May 2015.

The Scottish Socialist Party were not invited to be part of the Smith Commission, leaving them the only one of the six political parties that had registered with the Electoral Commission for the referendum campaign that were not able to send a representative.

=== After publication ===
Nicola Sturgeon, Scotland's first minister, commented "I welcome what is being recommended" but argued that it "doesn’t deliver a modern form of home rule". Claiming that too little power would be devolved to Scotland, she added "I want to have the power in our hands to create a better system to lift people out of poverty, to get our economy growing. That’s the kind of powerhouse parliament I want. Sadly it’s not the one that’s going to be delivered." Iain Macwhirter, writing in The Herald, argued that the lack of devolution of taxes other than income tax would "lock Scotland in economic decline". Polling in November 2014 indicated that a majority of Scots wanted greater devolution than that recommended by the Smith Commission.

=== After the 2015 UK general election ===
The SNP won 56 of the 59 seats contested in Scotland in the 2015 UK General Election, which was held on 7 May 2015. Speaking after the election, First Minister Nicola Sturgeon called for reforms greater than that proposed by Smith, particularly in respect of taxation and welfare. Former First Minister Jack McConnell described Smith as a "shambles" and called on Cameron to lead a new constitutional convention. Malcolm Rifkind, a former Secretary of State for Scotland, also expressed support for the idea of some sort of new commission. In response, Cameron said he would "look at" any proposals for further powers for Scotland but wanted to get the Smith Commission plans implemented first.

In December 2014, four SNP councillors were filmed burning the Smith Report outside Renfrewshire Council. They were suspended for two months. In March 2015, they were all re-elected to their executive posts by the SNP group on Renfrewshire Council.

== Legislation ==
Once the Smith Commission's recommendations had been published they were debated in the UK Parliament and a command paper was published in January 2015 putting forward draft legislative proposals. A Scottish Parliament committee report published in May 2015 said that the draft bill proposed in January 2015 did not meet the recommendations of the Smith Commission, specifically in relation to welfare payments. A spokesman for the UK Government said that a full Parliamentary discussion would follow. A bill based on the Smith Commission's recommendations was announced by the UK government in the May 2015 Queen's Speech. The bill subsequently became law as the Scotland Act 2016 in March 2016.

== See also ==
- Commission on Scottish Devolution, also referred to as the Calman Commission
- Constitutional Commission
- A Constitution for a Free Scotland
- Constitution of the United Kingdom
- Edinburgh Agreement (2012)
- National Conversation
- Royal Commission on the Constitution (United Kingdom), also referred to as the Kilbrandon Commission
- Scottish Consolidated Fund
- Scottish Constitutional Convention
- Scotland Act 2012
- Social Security Scotland
