= Scotland Bill =

Scotland Bill can refer to:

- the proposed legislation for Scottish home rule presented to the UK Parliament in 1977, which became the Scotland Act 1978 (subsequently repealed)
- the proposed legislation for Scottish devolution presented to the UK Parliament in 1997, which became the Scotland Act 1998
- the proposed legislation to amend the Scotland Act 1998 to devolve further power to Scotland, presented to the UK Parliament in 2010, which became the Scotland Act 2012
- the proposed legislation to extend the powers of the Scottish Parliament in 2015 via the Scotland Bill 2015-16
