= Pesa =

Pesa or PESA may refer to:

- Pesa (river), a tributary to the Arno in Italy
- Pesa (money), a currency term in several languages
- Pesa (rupie), a subdivision of the German East African rupie
- Pesa (company), Polish rolling stock manufacturer
- Pesa Mińsk Mazowiecki, Polish rolling stock manufacturer

== PESA ==
- Percutaneous epididymal sperm aspiration
- Passive electronically scanned array
- Progression of Early Subclinical Atherosclerosis
- Public Expenditure Statistical Analyses
- Provisions of the Panchayats (Extension to the Scheduled Areas) Act, 1996, Indian legislation

== People with the surname Peša ==
- Njego Peša (born 1958), Croatian American association football player
- Siniša Peša (born 1973), Serbian track and field athlete

== People with the given name Pesa ==
- Pesa Teoni, American Samoan pickleball player

== See also ==
- M-Pesa
- Peso
