= Union dividend =

Term used by British unionists

The Union dividend is a term used by British unionists to describe the financial benefits which they believe that Scotland, Wales and Northern Ireland derive from being countries of the United Kingdom. Politicians who argue for the existence of a Union dividend include Tony Blair, Gordon Brown, Jim Murphy, Ian Davidson, Jack McConnell, Wendy Alexander, Iain Gray and Jackie Baillie.

The idea saw increased discussion in the leadup to the 2014 Scottish independence referendum. In May 2014, the UK Government said in an analysis paper that there was a "UK dividend" worth £1,400 to each person in Scotland. This estimate was mainly based upon there being higher public spending in Scotland. The Scottish Government said that Scots would be £1,000 better off by 2030 if Scotland became an independent state, due to greater productivity and higher tax revenues. The difference between the two figures was mainly due to differing forecasts of revenue from North Sea oil.

== See also ==
- Barnett formula
- Block grant
- Calman Commission
- Economy of Scotland
- Economy of Wales
- Economy of Northern Ireland
- Fiscal autonomy for Scotland
- Government Expenditure and Revenue Scotland
- It's Scotland's oil
- Scottish Consolidated Fund
