= Scottish variable rate =

The Scottish variable rate (SVR) was a mechanism which would have enabled the Scottish Government to vary (down or up) the basic rate of UK income tax by up to 3p in the pound. The power was never used (and indeed was allowed to lapse by the Scottish Government in 2007) and was succeeded by the legislative framework for Scottish public finance in the Scotland Act 2012, which gives the Scottish Parliament the power to set a Scottish rate of income tax.

When legislating for the Scottish Parliament, a number of matters were reserved by the UK Parliament at Westminster. One such reserved matter was taxation; however, this had been a key point in Scottish negotiations relating to parliamentary control. As a means of compromise, Westminster afforded the Scottish Parliament the ability to vary income tax, which was subsequently given the consent of the Scottish electorate in the second question of the 1997 devolution referendum.

Therefore, the Scotland Act 1998 granted the Scottish Parliament the power to vary income tax by ±3p in every pound. This power was often referred to as the tartan tax, a phrase first used by Conservative financier and politician Michael Forsyth as a way of attacking the power, using the idea of 'tartan' to get across the idea that it would be an extra tax on Scots alone.

== See also ==
- Fiscal autonomy
- HM Revenue and Customs
- Local income tax
- Scottish Consolidated Fund
- Taxation in the United Kingdom
