= Goschen formula =

Ratio used for devolved government funding

The Goschen formula (or Goschen proportions) was a ratio devised by George Goschen when Chancellor of the Exchequer, to allocate funding for services in Scotland and Ireland compared with England and Wales, and used from 1888.

== Original formulation ==
The Goschen proportions were originally set at 80:11:9, for England & Wales, Scotland, and Ireland respectively. There is disagreement as to whether this was to reflect the proportions in which the three major territories paid probate duty, or whether the ratio was based on population shares.

The populations of England & Wales, Scotland, and Ireland in the 1891 census are given as 29.0m, 4.0m and 4.7m respectively. This means that Goschen initially gave England & Wales 80% of the funds for 76.9% of the population, Scotland 11% of the funds for 10.6% of the population, and Ireland 9% of the funds for 12.5% of the population.

== Development prior to Irish independence ==
The following decades saw the percentage population shares of Scotland and Ireland decline, while England's population share increased. In 1911, which was the last full government census which included the whole of Ireland (the 1921 census was cancelled in Ireland because of widespread IRA activity), the populations of England & Wales, Scotland, and Ireland are given as 36.07m (79.8%), 4.76m (10.5%), and 4.39m (9.7%) respectively.

== Development after Irish independence ==
After the formation of the Irish Free State in 1922, Scottish politicians and civil servants continued to insist that Scotland was entitled to at least its Goschen proportion (11/80ths of England & Wales's amount, i.e. 12.1% of the England, Scotland and Wales total). This meant that Scotland began this period with a higher spend per head: in the 1921 census, Scotland's population (4.88m) was only 11.4% of the England, Scotland and Wales total (42.77m). This gap widened further over the subsequent decades, because while the Goschen proportion was fixed, Scotland's population growth lagged far behind that of England & Wales: In 1971, the last census before the Goschen formula was succeeded by the Barnett formula in 1978, Scotland's population (5.24m) was down to only 9.6% of the England, Scotland and Wales total (54.39m).

In addition to this demographic effect, 'After World War II successive Scottish Secretaries of State negotiated additional allocations for their territorial departments by arguing special needs, such as sparsity of population in the remote areas and density and poor housing in the central belt.'
