= Scottish Social Attitudes Survey =

Annual survey of public opinion in Scotland

The Scottish Social Attitudes Survey, started in 1999, is an annual survey of public opinion in Scotland, funded by the public purse.

Conducted by the Scottish branch of NatCen Social Research, in conjunction with the Unit for the Study of Government in Scotland at the University of Edinburgh, it is largely funded by the Scottish Government and its agencies.

The 1999 survey also functioned as the Scottish Parliament Election Study.

== 2010 Survey ==
The 2010 Scottish Social Attitudes Survey core finding was that just 28% of respondents supported Scottish independence, a lower level than in two recent social attitude studies. A majority support "devo max" (maximum devolution) with 60% of respondents wanting the Scottish Parliament to control Scotland's £18 billion welfare bill (including power over public pensions and benefits), and a majority (59%) also supported taxation levels being decided in Edinburgh rather than London. This goes further than the conclusions of the Calman Report.

The survey found that most Scots only supported powers over defence, foreign affairs and monetary policy remaining with the UK Government.
