= Jim Gallagher (civil servant) =

Scottish civil servant

James Daniel Gallagher CB FRSE is a Scottish civil servant. He was Director General of devolution for the United Kingdom's Ministry of Justice from 2007 until 2010, and served as Secretary to the Commission on Scottish Devolution. He joined Better Together in January 2014 as a strategy advisor.

He was appointed a Companion of the Order of the Bath (CB) in the 2005 Birthday Honours.
