= Income tax in Scotland =

Form of taxation in Scotland

Income tax in Scotland is a tax of personal income gained through employment. This is a tax controlled by the Scottish Parliament, both in terms of how it is spent and the setting of rates for its collection, and collected by HM Revenue & Customs. The Scottish Government receives the tax back from HM Revenue & Customs via HM Treasury. Since 2017, the Scottish Parliament has had the ability to set income tax rates and bands, apart from the personal allowance. Since this point, differences have developed between income tax rates in Scotland and those elsewhere in the UK.

In 2024, the Scottish Fiscal Commission (SFC) estimated that Income Tax revenue in Scotland will generate an estimate value of £20.5 billion in 2025–2026. The tax system in Scotland operates on a basis of high income households to low income households, meaning that higher earning households will pay more tax than those in lower earning incomes.

== History ==
When the devolved Scottish Parliament was set up in 1999, the Scottish Parliament had the power to vary the rate of income tax by 3% (in either direction) from the rates applied in the rest of the UK. This power was specifically authorised by the second question of the 1997 devolution referendum. In any event, no Scottish Government ever chose to use the variable rate, and left tax rates the same as they were in the rest of the UK.

Following the passage of the Scotland Act 2012, the Scottish Parliament was given greater powers over income tax. In the 2016–2017 tax year it had to set a Scottish Rate of Income Tax (SRIT). The idea of the power was that the UK tax rate would be reduced by 10%, with the block grant being reduced by an equivalent amount. In 2016–2017 the Scottish budget set the SRIT at 10%, which left tax rates at the same level as in the rest of the UK. Since the introduction of the Scotland Act 2012, the Scottish Government's approach to tax policy has been largely based on Adam Smith’s "four canons of taxation" – Certainty, Proportionality, Convenience and Efficiency.

The Scotland Act 2016 gave the Scottish Parliament full control over income tax rates and bands, except the personal allowance. The Scottish Government has stated that, as a result of changes to the way income tax in Scotland is administered following the Scotland Act 2016, Scotland has a more "progressive and fairer" tax system, claiming that "households in the lower half of the income distribution are around £450 better off a year than they would be under UK Government tax and social security policies". Since the introduction of the Scotland Act 2016, there have been greater divergence between both the tax systems in Scotland and the United Kingdom. In 2017–2018, the only notable difference between Scotland and the rest of the UK was that the higher rate limit was frozen in Scotland. In the draft budget for 2018/19, new rates and bands were proposed. The basic rate of 20% was split into three different levels, with a lower starter rate of 19% and higher intermediate rate of 21% being introduced whilst taxes on income in the top two tax bands were increased by 1p in the pound to 41% and 46% respectively.

== Tax rates and bands ==
=== 2017–2018 ===
This tax year was the first in which the Scotland Act 2016 was in force, with the first ever differentiated Scottish income tax. The only difference from the rates for the rest of the UK was the threshold for the higher rate (£43,000 as opposed to £45,000).

2017–2018
Rate	Income tax rate	Gross income
Basic rate	20%	£11,500 (Note: Assumes individuals are in receipt of the standard UK personal allowance.) – £43,000
Higher rate	40%	£43,001 – £150,000 (Note: Those earning more than £100,000 will see their personal allowance reduced by £1 for every £2 earned over £100,000.)
Additional rate	45%	Above £150,000

=== 2018–2023 ===
Two new bands were introduced in 2018, and remained in place with the same rates until the 2022–2023 tax year.

2018–2023
Rate	Income tax rate	Gross income				
Rate	Income tax rate	2018–2019	2019–2020	2020–2021	2021–2022	2022–2023
Starter rate	19%	£11,850 – £13,850	£12,500 – £14,549	£12,500 – £14,585	£12,570 – £14,667	£12,570 – £14,732
Basic rate	20%	£13,851 – £24,001	£14,550 – £24,944	£14,586 – £25,158	£14,668 – £25,296	£14,733 – £25,688
Intermediate rate	21%	£24,001 – £43,430	£24,945 – £43,430	£25,159 – £43,430	£25,297 – £43,662	£25,689 – £43,662
Higher rate	41%	£43,431 – £150,000			£43,663 – £150,000	
Top rate	46%	Above £150,000				

=== 2023–2024 ===
The higher and top rates were increased by 1% as of April 2023.

2023–2024
Rate	Income tax rate	Gross income
Rate	Income tax rate	2023–2024
Starter rate	19%	£12,570 – £14,732
Basic rate	20%	£14,733 – £25,688
Intermediate rate	21%	£25,689 – £43,632
Higher rate	42%	£43,633 – £125,140
Top rate	47%	Above £125,140

=== 2024–2025 ===
2024 saw the introduction of a new Advanced tax band, as well as an increase to the top rate by one percentage point.

2024–2025
Rate	Income tax rate	Gross income
Rate	Income tax rate	2024–2025
Starter rate	19%	£12,571 - £14,876
Basic rate	20%	£14,877 – £26,561
Intermediate rate	21%	£26,562 – £43,662
Higher rate	42%	£43,663 – £75,000
Advanced rate	45%	£75,001 – £125,140
Top rate	48%	Above £125,140
