= Consolidated Fund =

Main bank account of the government in certain countries

In many states with political systems derived from the Westminster system, a consolidated fund or consolidated revenue fund is the main bank account of the government. General taxation is taxation paid into the consolidated fund (as opposed to hypothecated taxes earmarked for specific purposes), and general spending is paid out of the consolidated fund.

== The British Consolidated Fund ==
=== Establishment ===
The Consolidated Fund of Great Britain was established in 1787 as a result of the passing of the Customs and Excise Act 1787. It was so named as it consolidated together a number of existing accounts, detailed below, and facilitated proper parliamentary oversight of the spending of the executive; it was defined as "one fund into which shall flow every stream of public revenue and from which shall come the supply of every service".

The Treasury established the Consolidated Fund account (formally The Account of His Majesty's Exchequer) at the Bank of England where it remains to this day. The legal term "Consolidated Fund" refers to the amount of credit held in this particular account. Use of the fund is governed by the Exchequer and Audit Departments Act 1866, which stipulates that most of the revenue from taxation, and all other money payable to the Exchequer, must be paid into the Consolidated Fund. The fund can only be drawn upon by HM Treasury, and this can only take place if and where Parliament has given its consent.

=== Earlier funds ===
The General Fund was established in 1617, the Aggregate Fund in 1715, the South Sea Fund in 1717. These funds were established in relation to specific government borrowing authorized by Parliament, which had a defined type of revenue appropriated to put towards the interest and repayment. That particular revenue would be paid into the fund related to the loan. For example, the South Sea Fund was related to the debts of the South Sea Company. The Aggregate Fund was paid all the hereditary revenues of the English (and later British) Crown, such as profits from the Crown Estate and the Royal Mail. The hereditary revenues of Scotland were paid into the Consolidated Fund from 1788 onwards.

From 1716 onwards the surplus of the first three funds, after the interest and principal payments, flowed into a fourth fund, the sinking fund. This was intended to be applied to the repayment of the national debt but was instead mainly used for day-to-day necessities. It was eventually placed into the hands of the National Debt Commissioners, and was abandoned in the 1820s.

In 1752, before the Consolidated Fund was formed, the debts owed to the three existing funds had themselves been consolidated, and became irredeemable (the principal would only be repaid if the government chose to do so). They, therefore, became annuities, paying an annual rate of interest of 3%, and known as consolidated annuities, or consols.

=== Ireland's consolidated fund ===
The Consolidated Fund Services of Great Britain and Ireland were merged by the Consolidated Fund Act 1816 into the single Consolidated Fund of the United Kingdom that exists to this day.

The government of Ireland established separate funds for its own purposes when it gained autonomy in 1922 and then independence in 1937. The modern equivalent to the Consolidated Fund is the Central Fund.

=== Payments into the fund ===
All tax revenue is paid into the fund unless Parliament has specifically provided otherwise by law.

Any money received by the government which is not taxation, and is not to be retained by the receiving department (for example, fines), is classed as a Consolidated Fund extra receipt (CFER). These are to be paid into the Consolidated Fund as soon as they are received.

Balancing payments are made from the National Loans Fund (NLF), to ensure negative balances (caused by a spending in excess of taxation) are not carried over to the following day. Consolidate Fund Account 2020-21 (PDF), September 2021, p. 5

=== Payments out of the fund ===
==== Appropriation Acts and Consolidated Fund Acts ====
Parliament gives statutory authority for the government to draw funds from the Consolidated Fund by Acts of Parliament known as Appropriation Acts and Consolidated Fund Acts. Funds are made available under the acts only for a specified financial year, a concept known as annuality, although an individual act can cover more than one financial year, listing separate amounts for each. Often a two-year period is covered by a Consolidated Fund Act, and roughly two or three are passed in each parliamentary year.

A Consolidated Fund (Appropriation) Bill is brought in and passed at the end of the parliamentary year before the Summer recess. When passed, this is known as the Appropriation Act, and allocates the monies from the Consolidated Fund to the purposes set out in the main annual departmental expenditure estimates (the annual government department budgets, known as Estimates).

In the interim period between the start of the financial year and the passing of the Appropriation Act, a process known as votes on account is used to grant to departments up to 45% of the amounts they were allocated in the preceding financial year. These votes on account, and any necessary changes to departmental budgets (supplementary estimates) are passed as Consolidated Fund Acts, normally twice each year in November and February. Additional funds may be requested at any time, and will either require an additional Consolidated Fund Act, or will be included within other legislation.

The preamble of these supply acts is different from that of most other acts of Parliament. It currently reads:

Whereas the Commons of the United Kingdom in Parliament assembled have resolved to authorise the use of resources and the issue of sums out of the Consolidated Fund towards making good the supply which they have granted to Her Majesty in this Session of Parliament:—

Prior to 2001, an older form of wording was used:

Most Gracious Sovereign, We, Your Majesty's most dutiful and loyal subjects, the Commons of the United Kingdom in Parliament assembled, towards making good the supply which we have cheerfully granted to Your Majesty in this Session of Parliament, have resolved to grant unto Your Majesty the sums hereinafter mentioned; and do therefore most humbly beseech Your Majesty that it may be enacted and be it enacted by the Queen's most Excellent Majesty, by and with the advice and consent of the Lords Spiritual and Temporal, and Commons, in this present Parliament assembled, and by the authority of the same, as follows:—

This follows the constitutional principle that the Crown (government) demands money, the House of Commons grants it, and the House of Lords assents to the grant. Since the Glorious Revolution of 1688 only once, in 1784, has the Commons refused to grant access to funds.

If money paid from the Consolidated Fund is not spent by the end of the financial year, it must be repaid to the fund. Grant-in-aid payments are however excluded from this rule.

==== Standing services ====
Certain expenditure is by law charged directly to the Consolidated Fund and is not subject to Parliament's annual budget process, ensuring a degree of independence of the government. Services funded in this way are known as Consolidated Fund Services and include judges' salaries, the Civil List payments, the salary of the Comptroller and Auditor General, and the expenses paid to returning officers at elections. In the case of the judges, this is to ensure the judicial independence introduced by the Act of Settlement 1701.

=== Other modern funds ===
- The National Loans Fund is the government's main borrowing and lending account. It is closely linked to the Consolidated Fund, which maintains a daily balance of zero by means of a transfer to or from the National Loans Fund.
- The Exchange Equalisation Account is the government fund holding the UK's reserves of foreign currencies, gold, and special drawing rights. It can be used to manage the value of the pound sterling on international markets.
- The National Insurance Fund is an account which holds the contributions of the National Insurance Scheme.
- The Contingencies Fund is an account which may be used for urgent expenditure in anticipation that the money will be approved by Parliament, or for small payments that were not included in the year's budget estimates.

=== Control of the fund ===
Once Parliament has authorised a withdrawal from the Consolidated Fund, the Treasury will issue a request to the comptroller for access to the funds granted by Parliament.

==== Comptroller ====
The Comptroller and Auditor General (who is also head of the National Audit Office) must authorise each requisition request received by the Bank of England from His Majesty's Treasury, to ensure that the request is compliant with the amounts and purposes authorised by Parliament in statute.

(The Comptroller controls both the Consolidated Fund and the National Loans Fund. The full official title of the role is Comptroller General of the Receipt and Issue of His Majesty's Exchequer. If funds are mistakenly paid into the Consolidated Fund then both the Comptroller and the Treasury must agree to its return.)

Once the comptroller is satisfied that all is in order, he or she will grant the Treasury a 'credit' on the Consolidated Fund account at the Bank of England, enabling a payment to be made.

==== Principal accountants ====
Payments can only be made from the Consolidated Fund to one of the principal accountants defined by law. These are His Majesty's Paymaster General, the Commissioners of His Majesty's Revenue and Customs, the National Debt Commissioners, and the Chief Cashier at the Bank of England. Nowadays the Commissioners of HM Revenue and Customs are the key Principal Accountants in that they supervise the Government Banking Service, which in turn manages transfer payments to other government departments.

=== Devolved government ===
Each of the devolved government consolidated funds is held in the name of the Paymaster General at the Bank of England.

==== Scotland ====
The Westminster Parliament provides a sum of money annually to provide a budget for the Scottish Government and fund the operation of the Scottish Parliament and the salaries for judges of Scottish courts. This money is transferred from the UK Consolidated Fund into an account known as the Scottish Consolidated Fund.

If the income tax varying powers of the Scottish Parliament were to be used (the rate can be changed by plus or minus three percent), the additional revenue raised would be paid by HM Revenue and Customs directly to the Scottish Consolidated Fund. If the tax is reduced, then the amount paid from the UK Consolidated Fund in that year would be correspondingly reduced.

==== Wales ====
There is also a Welsh Consolidated Fund to provide a budget for the Welsh Government and the Senedd.

In addition to the budget provided to the Welsh Government, the expenditures of the Welsh National Assembly, the Auditor General for Wales, and the Public Services Ombudsman for Wales are also paid directly from the Welsh Consolidated Fund.

Payments are normally made from the fund following the passing in the Assembly of a budget motion or supplementary budget motion, proposed by the Welsh ministers. There are limited exceptions for emergency situations, or a failure of the Assembly to pass a budget; in addition some payments are automatically authorised by law, such as the salaries of National Assembly officials.

The Auditor General has to authorise all payments out of the Welsh Consolidated Fund to the Welsh ministers, having checked that the expenditure has been approved by the National Assembly.

==== Northern Ireland ====
The Northern Ireland Consolidated Fund has existed since 1921.

== Australia ==
The use of consolidated funds in Australian government dates back to colonial times. Today the Australian federal and state governments all maintain their own consolidated funds, with authorization for payments required from the relevant parliament.

=== Commonwealth (Federal) Government ===
The Australian Government's Consolidated fund is known as the Consolidated Revenue Fund (CRF). The CRF is established through sections 81 to 83 of the Constitution of Australia. The constitution gives no guidance as to how the revenues or monies that form the CRF are to be kept or accounted for as the CRF is said to be "self‑executing" – that is, all money paid to the Commonwealth automatically forms part of the CRF, whether or not it has been credited to a fund or a bank account. Instead, accounting and banking practices pertaining to government funds are established in the Public Governance, Performance and Accountability Act 2013. The Act requires that the Commonwealth maintains a central bank account with the Reserve Bank of Australia known as the Official Public Account (OPA). The act also allows for non-corporate Commonwealth entities (NCEs) to account for and retain their receipts provided they have legislative and policy authority from the Prime Minister or Cabinet. However, most money collected by NCEs is treated as general government revenue that is not retainable and must be remitted to the OPA.

==== Payments into the Consolidated Revenue Fund ====
Section 81 of the Constitution of Australia provides that:

All revenues or moneys raised or received by the Executive Government of the Commonwealth shall form one Consolidated Revenue Fund (CRF), to be appropriated for the purposes of the Commonwealth in the manner and subject to the charges and liabilities imposed by this Constitution.

"Revenues or moneys raised or received" includes for instance taxes, fines, charges, levies, borrowings, loan repayments and money held in trust.

==== Payments out of the Consolidated Revenue Fund ====
Section 83 of the Australian Constitution provides that no money shall be drawn from the Treasury of the Commonwealth except under an appropriation made by law. The "Treasury of the Commonwealth" in Section 83 is held to be the same thing as the "Consolidated Revenue Fund" referred to in section 81, so taken together these two sections mean that there must be an appropriation for the purposes of the Commonwealth made by law before money may be drawn from the CRF.

Section 83 was intended to both safeguard parliament’s control over government spending, and restrict that expenditure to purposes authorised by the constitution. Over the years the meaning of "for the purposes of the Commonwealth" has been broadened considerably. It has been the subject of several High Court battles, and remains in contention.

=== New South Wales ===
Sections 39 and 40 of the Constitution of New South Wales require that all revenues, loans and other monies collected by the state are to be paid into a single consolidated fund. This was originally formed as the Consolidated Revenue Fund in 1855, and was merged with the state's General Loan Account to be named the Consolidated Fund from 1982.

== The Consolidated Fund of India ==
The Indian government and each Indian state government maintain their own consolidated funds.

Article 266(1) of the Constitution of India requires revenues received (direct and indirect taxes, money borrowed) by the Government of India and expenses (receipts from loans given by the government), excluding the exceptional items, are part of consolidated fund.

The Comptroller and Auditor General of India audits these funds and reports to the relevant legislatures on their management.

The budget consists of two types of expenditure – the expenditure ‘charged’ upon the Consolidated Fund of India and the expenditure ‘made’ from the Consolidated Fund of India.

The charged expenditure is non-votable by the Parliament, that is, it can only be discussed by the Parliament, while the other type has to be voted by the Parliament.

The list of the charged expenditure is:

1. Emoluments and allowances of the President and other expenditure relating to his office.
2. Salaries and allowances of the Chairman and the Deputy Chairman of the Rajya Sabha and the Speaker and the Deputy Speaker of the Lok Sabha.
3. Salaries, allowances and pensions of the judges of the Supreme Court.
4. Pensions of the judges of high courts.
5. Salary, allowances and pension of the Comptroller and Auditor General of India
6. Salaries, allowances and pension of the chairman and members of the Union Public Service Commission.
7. Administrative expenses of the Supreme Court, the office of the Comptroller and Auditor General of India and the Union Public Service Commission including the salaries, allowances and pensions of the persons serving in these offices.
8. The debt charges for which the Government of India is liable, including interest, sinking fund charges and redemption charges and other expenditure relating to the raising of loans and the service and redemption of debt.
9. Any sum required to satisfy any judgment, decree or award of any court or arbitral tribunal.
10. Any other expenditure declared by the Parliament to be so charged.

== See also ==
- Contingencies fund
- Own resources
- Central Fund, equivalent in the republic of Ireland
