= Scotland Act 2016 =

Act of the Parliament of the United Kingdom

Scotland Act 2016 (Note: Section 73.)
- Act of Parliament
- Parliament of the United Kingdom
- Long title: An Act to amend the Scotland Act 1998 and make provision about the functions of the Scottish Ministers; and for connected purposes.
- Citation: 2016 c. 11
- Introduced by: David Mundell (Commons); Lord Dunlop (Lords)
- Territorial extent: United Kingdom

Dates
- Royal assent: 23 March 2016
- Commencement: 23 March 2016; (Note: Section 72.)
Other legislation
Amends	Coastguard Act 1925; Civil List Act 1952; Crown Estate Act 1961; Oil Taxation Act 1975; Representation of the People Act 1983; Road Traffic Regulation Act 1984; Representation of the People Act 1985; Gas Act 1986; Social Security Act 1988; Road Traffic Act 1988; Electricity Act 1989; Broadcasting Act 1990; Social Security Contributions and Benefits Act 1992; Social Security Administration Act 1992; Taxation of Chargeable Gains Act 1992; Tribunals and Inquiries Act 1992; Road Traffic (Temporary Restrictions) Procedure Regulations 1992; Railways Act 1993; Petroleum (Production) (Landward Areas) Regulations 1995; Merchant Shipping Act 1995; Zebra, Pelican and Puffin Pedestrian Crossings Regulations and General Directions 1997; Scotland Act 1998; Petroleum Act 1998; National Assembly for Wales (Transfer of Functions) Order 1999; Scotland Act 1998 (Transfer of Functions to the Scottish Ministers etc) Order 1999; Political Parties, Elections and Referendums Act 2000; Utilities Act 2000; Finance Act 2001; Enterprise Act 2002; Office of Communications Act 2002; Traffic Signs Regulations and General Directions 2002; Energy Act 2004; Gambling Act 2005; Scotland Act 1998 (Transfer of Functions to the Scottish Ministers etc) Order 2005; Income Tax Act 2007; Marine and Coastal Access Act 2009; Equality Act 2010; Energy Act 2010; Interpretation and Legislative Reform (Scotland) Act 2010; Postal Services Act 2011; Finance Act 2011; Scotland Act 2012; Public Appointments Order in Council 2014
Repeals/revokes	Scotland Act 1998 (Modification of Schedules 4 and 5 and Transfer of Functions to the Scottish Ministers) Order 2015; Scotland Act 1998 (Modification of Schedules 4 and 5) Order 2015
Amended by	Petroleum (Transfer of Functions) Regulations 2016; Scottish Crown Estate Act 2019
Relates to	Wales Act 2017

Status: Amended

History of passage through Parliament

Text of statute as originally enacted

Revised text of statute as amended

The Scotland Act 2016 (c. 11) is an act of the Parliament of the United Kingdom. It sets out amendments to the Scotland Act 1998 and devolves further powers to Scotland. The legislation is based on recommendations given by the report of the Smith Commission, which was established on 19 September 2014 in the wake of the Scottish independence referendum.

== Provisions ==
The act gives extra powers to the Scottish Parliament and the Scottish Government, most notably:

- The ability to amend sections of the Scotland Act 1998 which relate to the operation of the Scottish Parliament and the Scottish Government within the United Kingdom including control of its electoral system (subject to a two-thirds majority within the parliament for any proposed change)
- Legislative control over areas such as road signs, speed limits, onshore oil and gas extraction, abortion, welfare foods, gaming machines, rail franchising, consumer advocacy and advice amongst others by devolution of powers in relation to these fields to the Scottish Parliament and the Scottish Ministers.
- Management of the Crown Estate and British Transport Police in Scotland
- Control over Air Passenger Duty and new legislative powers for raising an Aggregates Levy in Scotland.
- Enhanced control over aspects of several welfare and housing related benefits and Disability Living Allowance, Personal Independence Payment, Attendance Allowance and Carer's Allowance as well as the ability to create new welfare benefits.
- Substantial powers over Income Tax rates and bands on non-savings and non-dividend income
- Extended powers over Employment Support and the housing aspect of Universal Credit
- The right to receive half of the VAT raised in Scotland.

=== Permanence of the Scottish Parliament and Scottish Government ===
This Act recognises the Scottish Parliament and a Scottish Government as permanent among UK's constitutional arrangements, with a referendum required before either can be abolished. However, according to some commentators, the act institutes a weak statutory mechanism, which does not stipulate provisions or guarantees for such a referendum, or makes duties of Crown ministers in this respect publicly answerable to the Scottish electorate.

1. The Scottish Parliament and the Scottish Government are a permanent part of the United Kingdom's constitutional arrangements.
2. The purpose of this section is, with due regard to the other provisions of this Act, to signify the commitment of the Parliament and Government of the United Kingdom to the Scottish Parliament and the Scottish Government.
3. In view of that commitment it is declared that the Scottish Parliament and the Scottish Government are not to be abolished except on the basis of a decision of the people of Scotland voting in a referendum.

== Amendments ==
About 120 amendments and new clauses were lodged on the bill by opposition parties but these were rejected by the Commons.

== Fiscal framework ==
During the passage of the bill, almost a full year of negotiations took place between the Scottish and UK Governments concerning the fiscal framework that accompanied it. This was necessary because of the intention to reduce the block grant given to the Scottish government by HM Treasury to take account of the additional income the Scottish government will receive through retaining a portion of the revenues from income tax that is generated in Scotland.

The Smith Commission said that there should be “no detriment” to either government in this context, something which is technically difficult to achieve. A Scottish government proposal was that future adjustment to the block grant should be based on the “per capita index”, which takes into account the growth in tax receipts across the UK, not just Scotland. This is significant because Scotland's economy and population were not growing as fast as the UK's. However, the Treasury position was that this would be unfair to the rest of the UK.

== See also ==
- for the Scotland Bill 1977–78, see Scotland Act 1978 (subsequently repealed)
- for the Scotland Bill 1997–98, see Scotland Act 1998
- for the Scotland Bill 2011–12, see Scotland Act 2012
- Scottish Crown Estate Act 2019
- Constitution of the United Kingdom
- Scottish devolution
- Politics of the United Kingdom
