= Local income tax in Scotland =

Several political parties have advocated a local income tax in Scotland as an alternative to the Council Tax, as part of funding for local authorities. Various proposals were promoted during the 2007 general election campaign.

== Proposals ==
In 2004, the Scottish Socialist Party launched a "Scrap the Council Tax" campaign, boosted by a poll suggesting 77% of Scots supported the abolition of the tax. A bill proposing a progressive system of taxation based on a household's income was presented in 2005, but was defeated with 12 MSPs in favour, 94 against, and 6 abstaining. Although the SNP and the Liberal Democrats supported the principle of income-based taxation, they disagreed with the SSP's specific proposals, which would have exempted anyone with an annual income of less than £10,000 and reduced liabilities for anyone with an annual income of less than £30,000, while targeting revenue generation to household incomes in excess of £90,000.

Different proposals to abolish council tax formed part of the manifestos of the Scottish National Party and the Liberal Democrats during the Scottish Parliament general election of May 2007. The SNP version involves the centralised distribution of funds raised from the new tax throughout the Scottish local authorities whereas the Liberal Democrats' proposal devolves the distribution to individual authorities. The SSP said under its proposals, unlike other local income tax schemes, the set-up costs and problems of fiscal flight would be insignificant, as the tax rates are not set locally.

After the 2007 election, the SNP-run Scottish Government planned to bring forward legislation to replace Council Tax with a local income tax as part of the funding for Scottish local authorities. A major setback took place when the UK government said it would withhold almost £400 million in Council Tax Benefit if the Scottish government implemented the proposals. Controversially, the UK government said it would, however, release the funds for a tax scheme designed by Scottish Labour.

== See also ==
- Business rates in Scotland
- Tartan tax
- Taxation in the United Kingdom
- Income tax
- Local taxation
- Council Tax
- Land Value Tax
