= Full fiscal autonomy for Scotland and Wales =

Form of devolution proposed for Scotland and Wales

Full fiscal autonomy (FFA) – also known as devolution max, devo-max, or fiscal federalism – is a proposed extension of the devolved powers of the Scottish and Welsh Parliaments over public finance. The term has come to describe a proposed arrangement whereby rather than receiving a block grant from HM Treasury at Westminster as at present, the Scottish Parliament and Senedd would receive all taxation collected in Scotland or Wales; the Scottish and Welsh Governments would reimburse the UK government for Scotland or Wales's share of UK-wide programmes, mainly defence and foreign relations. Scottish/Welsh fiscal autonomy – stopping short of full political independence – is usually promoted by advocates of a federal United Kingdom. It has also been proposed by the Scottish National Party, currently the governing party in Scotland, as a potential third option in a future independence referendum.

== History ==
=== Scotland ===
As early as July 2001, former Conservative Party chancellor Kenneth Clarke said he believed that it would be "disastrous for the Scottish economy". On the other hand, Robert Crawford, the former head of Scottish Enterprise, said in February 2004 that the Scottish economy "could be improved" by fiscal autonomy.

David Cameron, then leader of the Conservative Party, stated in 2005 that he would not stand in the way of handing full taxation powers to the Scottish Parliament if the idea was supported by the Scottish Conservative Party.

The 2011 Scottish Social Attitudes Survey core finding was that while 32% of respondents supported Scottish independence, 43% supported greater autonomy within the UK. 29% of respondents supported devo-max, but only 21% supported the status quo. The election of a majority Scottish National Party government in May 2011, committed to holding an independence referendum, also brought the possibility that FFA could be an extra option in the vote. Some senior Scottish Labour Party figures have also suggested that they would support devo max, including Malcolm Chisholm MSP, Mark Lazarowicz MP, and former First Minister Henry McLeish.

The "devo-max" option was not included in the 2014 independence referendum, however, as the Edinburgh Agreement stipulated that the referendum had to be a clear binary choice between independence or the existing devolution arrangements.

=== Wales ===
In 2017 a Welsh Labour MS, Mike Hedges advocated for a long term devo-max devolution settlement for Wales. In 2021, he produced a paper on potential devo-max for the Senedd. In it he outlined questions on pension age, social security system including contribution level and payment, alcohol and tobacco duty, UK and devolved taxes and their collection, distribution of financial support for poorer regions.

In 2021, the first minister of Wales, Mark Drakeford called for "home rule" for Wales, which was later described as a call for devo-max.

In 2022, Labour Mayor of Greater Manchester Andy Burnham called for "maximum" devolution to Wales, Scotland and Northern Ireland. He also proposed a senate of the nations and regions that would replace the House of Lords.

Devo-max is currently being considered as an option for constitutional reform by an independent commission on the constitutional future of Wales, set up by the Welsh Government and headed by Laura McAllister and Rowan Williams.

== Public opinion ==
=== Scotland ===
A public opinion poll carried out at the end of October 2011 for the BBC Politics Show indicated that devo-max was the most popular option with Scottish voters: 33% backed devo-max, 28% supported independence and 29% backed no further constitutional change. A public opinion poll carried out in March 2013 for the SNP indicated that 52% of respondents believed the Scottish Government should be responsible for all tax and spending decisions in Scotland. Also, 53% of respondents believed that the Scottish government would be best suited to decide welfare and pensions policy for Scotland.

=== Wales ===
In Wales, a YouGov poll in 2020 showed that 59% respondents who had a view said supported ‘devo-max’ for Wales in a referendum (40% in favour, 28% against). The question asked whether respondents supported transfer of powers for control of tax and welfare, but excluding defence and foreign affairs to the Senedd. Support by age group was as follows 82% of 18-24 year olds, 73% of 25-49 year olds, 51% of 50-64 year olds and 43% of 65+ year olds.

In the same poll in 2022, 56% who had a view said supported ‘devo-max’ for Wales in a referendum (40% in favour, 32% against).

== Impacts ==
=== Scotland ===
The economic effects of full fiscal autonomy have been the subject of debate. The Institute for Fiscal Studies published a report in March 2015 that calculated that for the year 2015–16 there would be a gap of £7.6 billion in Scotland's budget under FFA, in comparison with the current system for distributing spending.

This analysis has been criticised by the SNP's deputy leader, Stewart Hosie, on the basis that it represents figures for only one year and that it overlooks the extra growth the SNP says it can generate with more powers.

The Institute for Fiscal Studies responded to some of these criticisms in a later report. It argued:

"Delaying a move to full responsibility for a few years would not on its own deal with the fiscal gap.... Indeed, if anything, given current spending and revenue forecasts, the gap would likely grow rather than shrink over the next few years. It would remain the case that full fiscal responsibility would likely entail substantial spending cuts or tax rises in Scotland. While a big and sustained rebound in oil revenues or significantly higher growth in Scotland could mitigate this, there can be no presumption that either would occur.

"There are a number of aspects of fiscal autonomy which are unclear; the level of payments to the UK government (for debt interest and Trident renewal), the ability of the oil sector to redeploy into other areas filling the productivity gap, and whether economic growth in Scotland is better supported by an Edinburgh or London government".

=== Wales ===
Devo-max would mean a transfer of powers from Westminster to the Senedd that includes the right to control tax and welfare budgets.

Sioned Williams, Plaid Cymru MS suggested that full taxation powers should be devolved to the Senedd because "any reforms to tackle poverty that we undertake in Wales will always be limited" without full taxation powers.

== See also ==
=== Scotland ===
- Taxation in Scotland
- Scottish budget
- Economy of Scotland
- Government Expenditure and Revenue Scotland
- Politics of Scotland
- Scottish independence
- Commission on Scottish Devolution

=== Wales ===
- Welsh devolution
- Welsh fiscal balance
- Taxation in Wales
- Economy of Wales
- Welsh independence
- Politics of Wales

=== Other ===
- Federalism in the United Kingdom
- Proposed United Kingdom confederation
- Fiscal federalism
- Asymmetric federalism
- Home rule
- Union dividend
- Government spending in the United Kingdom
