= Public Expenditure Statistical Analyses =

Public finance programme of the United Kingdom

Public Expenditure Statistical Analyses (PESA) is a programme of HM Treasury in the United Kingdom. It serves two purposes: 1) providing information on government spending plans and outturn and 2) presenting statistical analyses of public expenditure.

PESA presents spending against two Treasury-defined frameworks. 1) Budgeting; This framework deals with spending within central government departmental budgets, which is how the Government plan and control public spending. Budgets comprise departments’ own spending as well as support to local government and public corporations. 2) Expenditure on services; This framework is broadly consistent with the treatment of spending in the National Accounts. Expenditure on services is used in PESA for statistical analysis and covers spending by the whole of the public sector to deliver services.
