= Scottish Consolidated Fund =

Fund operated by the Scottish Parliament

The Scottish Consolidated Fund is the main fund operated by the Scottish Parliament. It receives a block grant from the UK Parliament's Consolidated Fund plus the operational receipts of the Scottish Government. The fund operates under the Scotland Act 1998.

In 2010–2011, under the Barnett formula, the UK Exchequer returned a block grant of £26.8 billion of Scottish taxpayers' money to the fund.

== See also ==
- Barnett Formula
- Calman Commission
- Government Expenditure and Revenue Scotland
