= Commission on Scottish Devolution =

2007 government body regarding Holyrood's powers

The Commission on Scottish Devolution (Scottish Gaelic: Coimisean Fèin-riaghlaidh na h-Alba; Scots: Commeessioun on Scots Devolutioun), also referred to as the Calman Commission or the Scottish Parliament Commission or Review, was established by an opposition Labour Party motion passed by the Scottish Parliament on 6 December 2007, with the support of the Conservatives and Liberal Democrats. The governing Scottish National Party opposed the creation of the commission.

Its terms of reference were: "To review the provisions of the Scotland Act 1998 in the light of experience and to recommend any changes to the present constitutional arrangements that would enable the Scottish Parliament to serve the people of Scotland better, improve the financial accountability of the Scottish Parliament and continue to secure the position of Scotland within the United Kingdom."

The Commission held its first full meeting at the Scottish Parliament on 28 April 2008 and met at roughly monthly intervals during its period of work.

It issued a first report on 2 December 2008, and a final report on 15 June 2009. It was accountable to both the Scottish Parliament and the UK Government.

The Commission on Scottish Devolution should not be confused with the Scottish Constitutional Commission, which is an independent think-tank.

Calman Plus (also called devolution plus, Devo Plus or Devo 2.0) has been advocated by senior Scottish Liberal Democrat politicians, as the next step in deepening devolution. Calman Plus should not be confused with full fiscal autonomy, although neither concept has been definitively defined.

== Membership ==
The Commission has 15 members, including nominees of the three Unionist parties, representatives of business, trade unions, academia and community organisations.

- Professor Sir Kenneth Calman (convener); Chancellor of the University of Glasgow (Chairman)
- Lord Boyd of Duncansby; former Lord Advocate and Labour peer
- Rani Dhir; Director, Drumchapel Housing Co-operative
- Professor Sir David Edward; retired Judge of the European Court of Justice
- Lord Selkirk of Douglas; former Scottish Office Minister, now Conservative peer
- Lord Elder; member of the House of Lords (Labour)
- Audrey Findlay; former Leader of Aberdeenshire Council (Liberal Democrats)
- The Earl of Lindsay; former Scottish Office Minister, now Conservative peer and Chairman of the Scottish Agricultural College
- John Loughton; youth activist, former Chairman, Scottish Youth Parliament
- Murdoch MacLennan; Chief Executive, Telegraph Media Group
- Shonaig Macpherson; Chair of the National Trust for Scotland and of the Scottish Council for Development and Industry
- Iain McMillan; Director, CBI Scotland
- Mona Siddiqui; Professor of Islamic Studies, University of Glasgow
- Matt Smith; Scottish Secretary, UNISON
- Lord Wallace of Tankerness; former Deputy First Minister and former leader of the Scottish Liberal Democrats, now Liberal Democrat peer

== Task groups ==
The Commission established five task groups to assist it in its work, which met in between meetings of the full Commission. The task groups and their chairs are:

- Principles – Sir Kenneth Calman
- Functions – Professor Sir David Edward
- Engagement – Murdoch MacLennan
- Financial Accountability – Shonaig Macpherson
- Inter-Governmental Relations – Jim Wallace

== Independent expert group ==
There is also an independent expert group established to advise the Commission on financial accountability. This is chaired by Professor Anton Muscatelli, Vice-Chancellor and Principal of the University of Glasgow, and includes academics from Scotland, the rest of the UK and overseas. It produced a detailed report for the Commission in November 2008, examining different models for funding sub-national parliaments, and suggesting that a mixture of grant funding, tax devolution and tax assignment was likely to be necessary in a Scottish context. In June 2009, the IEG published further reports on borrowing and on natural resource taxation, plus a response to some of the Commission's consultation questions.

== First report ==
The Commission's first report, released in December 2008 declared that devolution had been a success, while making the case for Scotland's continued place within the United Kingdom. On funding, it endorsed the view of the independent expert group that full fiscal autonomy is incompatible with the continuation of the United Kingdom. The Report launched a second phase of consultation, inviting further evidence on a wide range of questions (encapsulated in an accompanying consultation document) by the end of February 2009.

== Final report ==
The Commission's final report was published on 15 June 2009.

The main conclusions and recommendations are:

- that devolution has been a success, and is here to stay
- that the Scottish Parliament should have substantially greater control over the raising of the revenues that make up the Scottish budget, primarily through sharing with the UK Parliament responsibility for setting income tax rates (although the number of rates, the differences between them, eligibility and so on should remain wholly UK responsibilities) and through devolution of some smaller taxes (Air Passenger Duty, Landfill Tax, the Aggregates Levy and Stamp Duty Land Tax)
- that the UK should reduce income tax rates in Scotland by 10p (on the basic and higher rates), and reduce the block grant by a corresponding amount, thus requiring the Scottish Parliament to make a tax decision (i.e. whether to restore the 10p or to set a Scottish rate that is higher or lower than the rate in the rest of the UK)
- that the reduced block grant should continue to be calculated through the Barnett formula in the short term, but that a UK-wide needs assessment should replace it in the longer term
- that the Scottish Government should have new borrowing powers to cover capital projects, as well as possibly enhanced access to short-term borrowing
- that responsibility for the regulation of airguns, the administration of elections, drink-driving limits and the national speed limit should be devolved
- that the regulation of health professions and corporate insolvency, currently largely reserved, should be fully reserved; and that there should be single UK definitions of "charity" and "charitable purposes"
- greater involvement of Scottish Ministers in key decisions and appointments relating to UK bodies such as the BBC, the Crown Estate and the Health and Safety Executive
- that there should be better inter-parliamentary dialogue and communication, including through removing barriers to joint working of committees, having Scottish Ministers attending UK Parliament committees and UK Ministers attending the Scottish Parliament (including to outline the implications of the annual Queen's Speech), and establishing a joint liaison committee
- enhancement of the Joint Ministerial Committee (JMC) structure, including by creation of new sub-committees, and the production of an annual report
- development of the existing Sewel Convention, including through entrenchment in Westminster standing orders, Scottish MPs being represented on committees scrutinising Bills that engage the Convention, and better communication between the Parliaments, including on "legislative consent motions" under the Convention
- the creation of a new mechanism to enable the Scottish Parliament to legislate on reserved matters with the UK Parliament's consent (by order)
- enhanced procedures for Scottish Parliamentary scrutiny of Bills, including splitting the existing Stage 3 into two stages, and creating a presumption that amendments at Stage 3 to introduce substantial new provisions will be referred back to committee
- a requirement that anyone introducing a Bill (not just a Minister) needs to state that the Bill is within the Parliament's legislative competence, and give reasons for that view.

== Calman Review white paper ==
Responding to the findings of the review, the UK Government announced on 25 November 2009, that new powers would be devolved to the Scottish Government, notably on how it can raise tax and carry out capital borrowing, and the running of Scottish Parliament elections. These proposals were detailed in a white paper setting out a new Scotland Bill, to become law before the 2015 Holyrood elections. The proposal was criticised by the British Parliament opposition parties for not proposing to implement any changes before the next general election. Scottish Constitution Minister Michael Russell criticised the white paper, calling it "flimsy" and stating that their proposed Referendum (Scotland) Bill, 2010, whose own white paper was to be published five days later, would be "more substantial". According to The Independent, the Calman Review white paper proposals fall short of what would normally be seen as requiring a referendum.

== 2010 UK coalition government ==
The United Kingdom Conservative-Liberal Democrat coalition government which was elected in 2010 pledged to implement the findings of the Calman Commission and subsequently used them as the basis for the Scotland Act 2012. In 2014 the UK government announced that in 2015 the Scottish Parliament would also be given direct access to capital funds and the ability to issue bonds.

== See also ==
- Smith Commission
- Scotland Act 2012, Edinburgh Agreement (2012)
- Constitutional Commission
- National Conversation
- Scottish Consolidated Fund
- Scottish Constitutional Convention
- A Constitution for a Free Scotland
- Constitution of the United Kingdom
- Royal Commission on the Constitution (United Kingdom), also referred to as the Kilbrandon Commission
- Independent Commission on Funding and Finance for Wales
- 2011 Welsh devolution referendum
- 2014 Scottish independence referendum
- Home rule
- Asymmetric federalism
