= Scotland Act 2012 =

Act of the Parliament of the United Kingdom to increase Scottish devolution

Scotland Act 2012 (Note: Section 45.)
- Act of Parliament
- Parliament of the United Kingdom
- Long title: An Act to amend the Scotland Act 1998 and make provision about the functions of the Scottish Ministers; and for connected purposes.
- Citation: 2012 c. 11
- Introduced by: Michael Moore
- Territorial extent: United Kingdom

Dates
- Royal assent: 1 May 2012
- Commencement: Various (Note: Section 44.)
Other legislation
Amends	Finance Act 1931; Crown Estate Act 1961; Misuse of Drugs Act 1971; Customs and Excise Management Act 1979; Road Traffic Regulation Act 1984; Road Traffic Act 1988; Broadcasting Act 1990; Criminal Procedure (Scotland) Act 1995; Finance Act 1996; Scotland Act 1998; Scotland Act 1998 (Transfer of Functions to the Scottish Ministers etc) Order 1999; Political Parties, Elections and Referendums Act 2000; Public Finance and Accountability (Scotland) Act 2000; Finance Act 2003; Income Tax (Earnings and Pensions) Act 2003; Scottish Parliament (Constituencies) Act 2004; Finance Act 2004; Commissioners for Revenue and Customs Act 2005; Finance (No. 2) Act 2005; Finance Act 2006; Income Tax Act 2007; Finance Act 2009
Amended by	Finance Act 2013; Finance Act 2014; Wales Act 2014; Revenue Scotland and Tax Powers Act 2014 (Consequential Provisions and Modifications) Order 2014; Deregulation Act 2015; Scotland Act 2012, Section 29 (Disapplication of UK Stamp Duty Land Tax) (Appointed Day) Order 2015; Scotland Act 2016; Digital Economy Act 2017

Status: Amended

Text of statute as originally enacted

Revised text of statute as amended

The Scotland Act 2012 (c. 11) is an act of the Parliament of the United Kingdom. It sets out amendments to the Scotland Act 1998, with the aim of devolving further powers to Scotland in accordance with the recommendations of the Calman Commission. It received royal assent in 2012.

== Main provisions ==
The act gave extra powers to the Scottish Parliament, most notably:

- The ability to raise or lower income tax by up to 10p in the pound. Any change is applied across all tax bands;
- Devolving stamp duty and landfill tax to Scotland to replace them with new taxes specific to Scotland;
- The Scottish Government to have borrowing powers, up to £5 billion;
- Legislative control over several more issues including limited powers relating to drink driving limits and air weapons;
- Creation of Revenue Scotland, the tax authority for Scotland's devolved taxes while HMRC still collects taxes that are not devolved to Scotland.

== Calman Commission ==
The proposed legislation was based on the final report of the Calman Commission, which was established by an opposition Labour Party motion in the Scottish Parliament in December 2007, against the wishes of the Scottish National Party minority government.

Professor Jim Gallagher, the civil servant who drafted the Bill, was appointed to advise the Scotland Bill Committee of the Scottish Parliament, convened by Wendy Alexander, whose parliamentary motion started the whole Calman process.

== Passage ==
The bill was presented to the House of Commons by the Secretary of State for Scotland, Michael Moore, on St Andrew's Day (30 November), 2010, and received an unopposed second reading on 27 January 2012.

The UK government stated that it would not pass the bill unless it had obtained a legislative consent motion from the Scottish Parliament, although the Parliament of the United Kingdom could have passed the bill in any case. The governing Scottish National Party indicated that it planned to block the bill. However, after a deal was reached between the two governments on 21 March 2012, the Scottish Parliament unanimously passed a legislative consent motion in respect of the bill on 18 April 2012.

== Reaction and analysis ==
The Secretary of State for Scotland, Michael Moore, described the legislation as the largest transfer of fiscal powers from central government since the creation of the United Kingdom.

Although the Scottish National Party supported some parts of the bill as introduced, it opposed others. In particular, it considered that the income tax proposals were flawed. However, the SNP agreed to support the Bill, after the proposals to return certain powers were dropped, and agreement was reached that the details of the income tax changes would be subject to approval by MSPs. After the Bill received legislative consent from the Scottish Parliament, the Cabinet Secretary for Parliamentary Business and Government Strategy, Bruce Crawford, MSP argued that, although the Bill would not harm Scottish interests, it represented a missed opportunity and had been overtaken by events, in particular the return of an SNP majority government in 2011 and the consequent independence referendum.

== Amendment ==
There is a proposal to amend section 57(2) of the Scotland Act 1998, which provides that the Lord Advocate, as a member of the Scottish Executive, has no power to do anything in contravention of the European Convention rights. Given that, alongside being the adviser to and representative of the Scottish Government in Scots law, the Lord Advocate is head of the system of criminal prosecution in Scotland and every prosecution in a Scottish court proceeds with his/her authority, this provision effectively allows any human rights issue raised in any criminal proceedings in Scotland effectively to be appealed to the UK Supreme Court as a constitutional "devolution issue".

The Supreme Court consists of two Supreme Court judges from Scotland and ten judges from other parts of the United Kingdom. When hearing appeals the Supreme Court sits with a bench of at least five judges, so even if both Scottish judges are present for a Scottish appeal, the majority of the bench will be judges who may not be especially well versed in Scots law and criminal procedure. According to Lord Hope of Craighead, the Deputy President of the Supreme Court, non-Scottish judges will in practice defer to their Scottish colleagues in Scottish cases, and often simply concur with judgments written by the Scottish judges. However, the situation is seen by some, including the Scottish Government, as undermining the status of the High Court of Justiciary as the final court of appeal in criminal matters in Scots law, and even of undermining the integrity of Scots law. The Advocate General for Scotland asked an expert group, chaired by Sir David Edward, to consider this issue and make recommendations, which led to the amendments to the Scotland Bill proposed by the UK Government. The Scottish Government remains concerned that the amendments may not fully address the issue, particularly as a result of the decision of the Supreme Court in Fraser v HM Advocate, and appointed their own expert group, chaired by Lord McCluskey, to consider the matter and report back.

== See also ==
- for the Scotland Bill 1977–78, see Scotland Act 1978 (subsequently repealed)
- for the Scotland Bill 1997–98, see Scotland Act 1998
- Constitution of the United Kingdom
- History of Scottish devolution
- History of the Scottish National Party
- Politics of the United Kingdom
