= 1997 devolution referendum =

1997 devolution referendum may refer to:

- 1997 Scottish devolution referendum
- 1997 Welsh devolution referendum
