= Scottish independence =

Political movement for Scotland leaving the UK

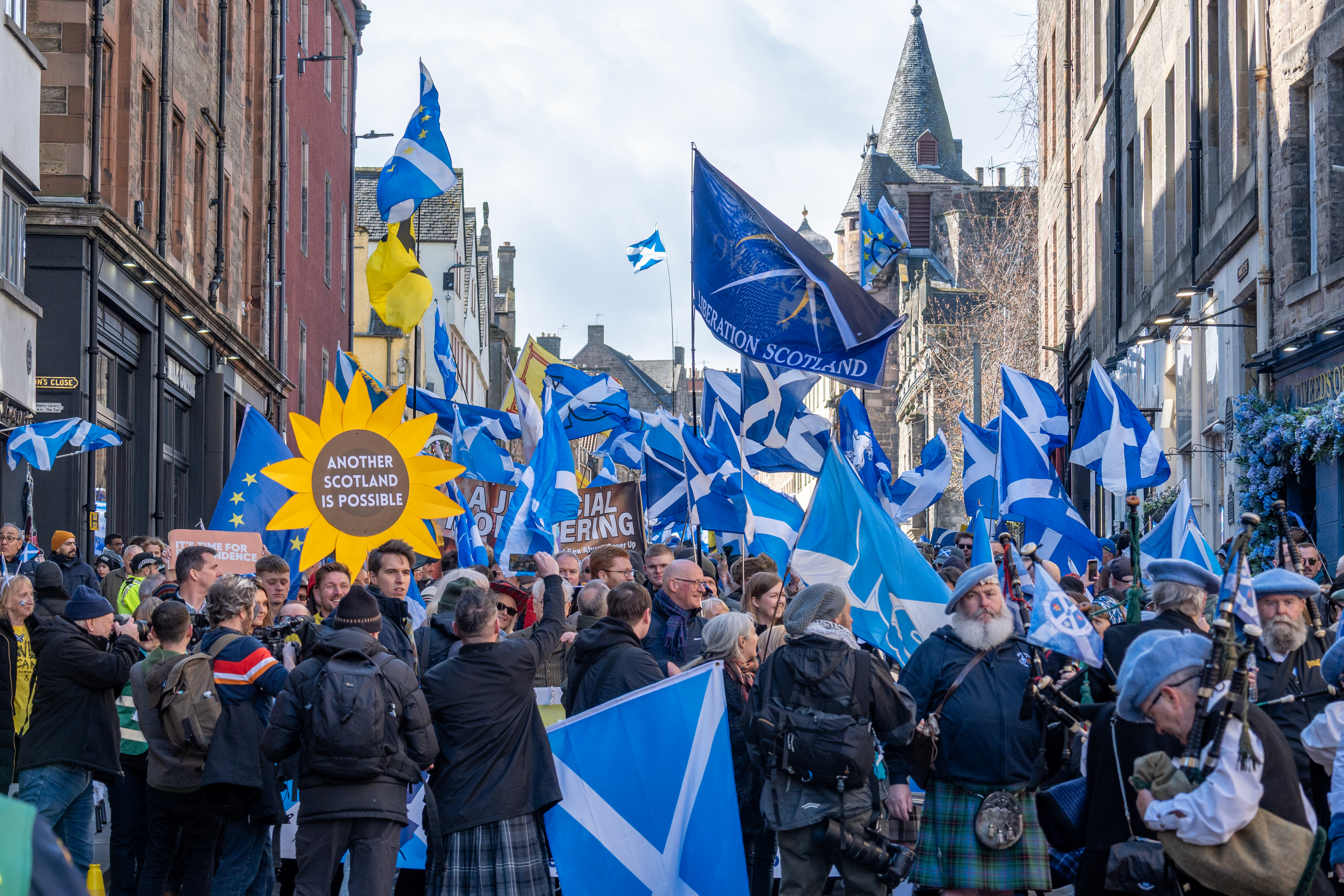
Pro-Scottish independence march in Edinburgh in 2026

Location of Scotland (dark green) – in Europe (green & dark grey) – in the United Kingdom (green)

Scottish independence (Scottish Gaelic: Neo-eisimeileachd na h-Alba; Scots: Scots unthirldom) is a political movement which advocates for the restoration of Scotland's status as a sovereign state independent from the United Kingdom.

Scotland was an independent kingdom through the Middle Ages, and fought wars to maintain its independence from the Kingdom of England. The two kingdoms were united in personal union in 1603 when, upon the death of Queen Elizabeth I of England, King James VI of Scotland also became James I of England. The kingdoms were united politically into one kingdom called Great Britain by the Acts of Union 1707 during the reign of Queen Anne. This united the countries, ended the wars of independence and created relative peace. Political campaigns for Scottish self-government began in the 19th century, initially in the form of demands for home rule within the United Kingdom. Two referendums on devolution were held in 1979 and in 1997, and a devolved Scottish Parliament was established on 1 July 1999.

The pro-independence Scottish National Party (SNP) first became the governing party of the devolved parliament following the 2007 Scottish Parliament election, and it won an outright majority of seats at the 2011 Scottish Parliament election. This led to an agreement between the Scottish and British governments to hold the 2014 Scottish independence referendum. Voters were asked: "Should Scotland be an independent country?" 44.7 percent answered "Yes" and 55.3 per cent answered "No". There was a record voter turnout of 85 per cent.

A second referendum on independence has been proposed, particularly since the UK voted to leave the European Union in the June 2016 membership referendum and since pro-independence parties increased their majority at the 2021 Scottish Parliament election. In June 2022, Nicola Sturgeon, the first minister of Scotland and the leader of the SNP, proposed the date of 19 October 2023 for a new independence referendum, subject to confirmation of its legality and constitutionality. In November 2022 the Supreme Court of the United Kingdom ruled that the Scottish Parliament did not have the power to legislate for a second referendum.

== History ==
=== Kingdom of Scotland ===
Scotland emerged as an independent polity during the Early Middle Ages with some historians dating its foundation from the reign of Kenneth MacAlpin in 843. (Note: Writing in 1992, Andrew Marr dated the formation of the Kingdom of Scotland at 1034, with the reign of Duncan I.) The level of independence of the Scottish kingdom was fought over by the Scottish kings and by the Norman and Angevin rulers of England who petitioned the pope in Rome and other foreign rulers.

A watershed in the Scottish kingdom's history was a succession crisis that erupted in 1290 when Edward I of England claimed the right of appointment to the Scottish throne. The Auld Alliance of Scotland and France against English interests was first invoked at that time and remained active through to the 16th century. The Wars of Scottish Independence ended in a renewed kingdom under Robert the Bruce (crowned 1306), whose grandson Robert II of Scotland was the first Scottish king of the House of Stuart.

=== Union ===
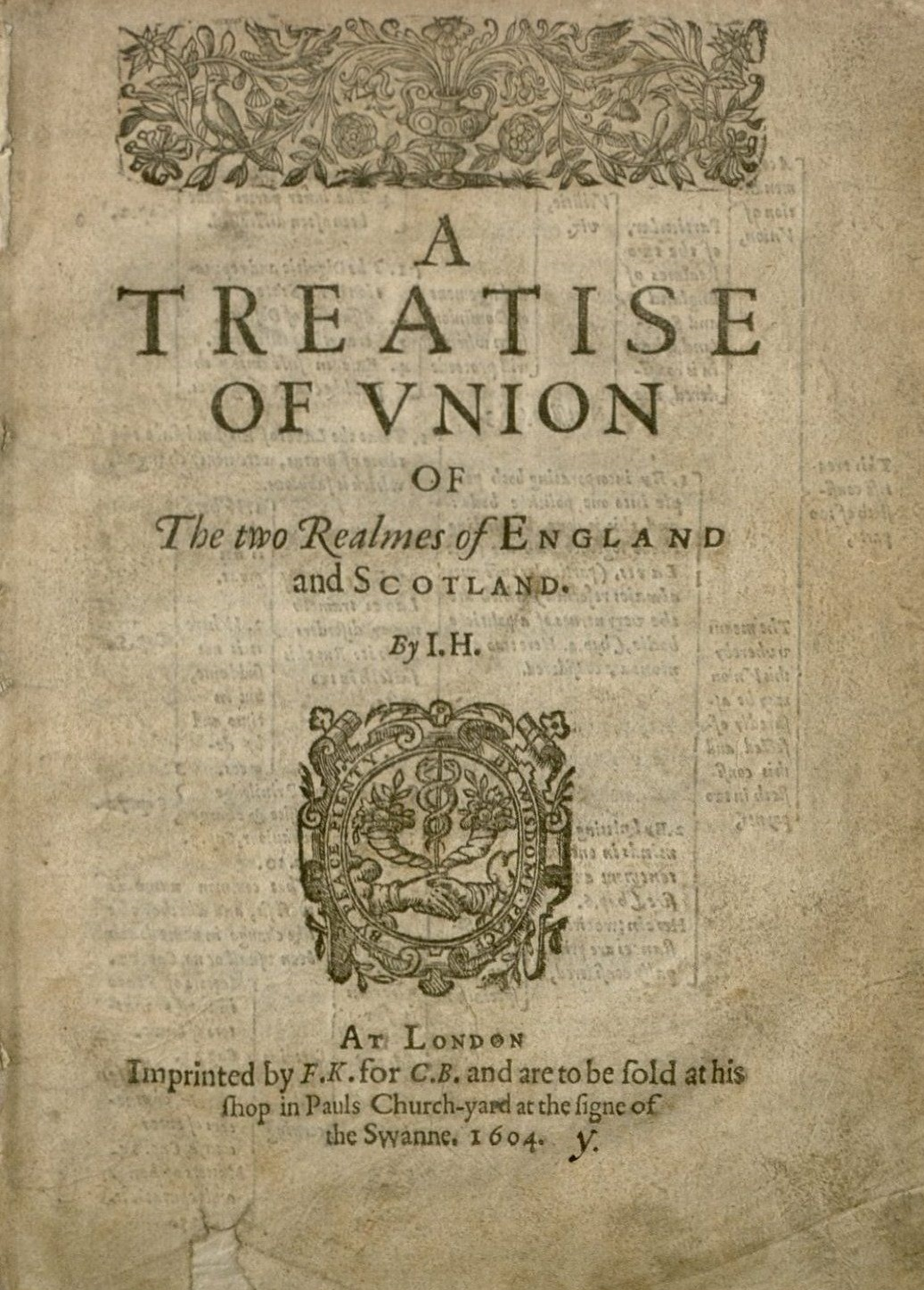
A treatise of union of the two realmes of England and Scotland by the English historian Sir John Hayward, 1604

From 1603 Scotland and England shared the same monarch in a personal union when James VI of Scotland was declared King of England and Scotland in what was known as the Union of the Crowns. After James II and VII was deposed in 1688 amid Catholic-Protestant disputes, and as the line of Protestant Stuarts showed signs of failing (as indeed occurred in 1714), English fears that Scotland would select a different monarch, potentially causing conflict within Great Britain, and the bankruptcy of many Scottish nobles through the Darien scheme led to the formal union of the two kingdoms in 1707, with the Treaty of Union and subsequent Acts of Union, to form the Kingdom of Great Britain. Scottish Jacobite resistance to the union, led by descendants of James II and VII including Bonnie Prince Charlie, continued until 1746.

The United Kingdom of Great Britain and Ireland was formed by the Acts of Union 1800, which united the Kingdom of Great Britain and the Kingdom of Ireland. Following the Irish War of Independence (1919–21) and the Anglo-Irish Treaty that ended the war, Ireland was partitioned into two states: Southern Ireland, which opted to become independent (and is now known as Republic of Ireland), and Northern Ireland, which – given its geographical extent which tended to ensure a Unionist majority – chose to remain within the United Kingdom.

=== Home rule movement ===
The "Home Rule" movement for a Scottish Assembly was first taken up in 1853 by the National Association for the Vindication of Scottish Rights, a body close to the Conservative Party. A key element in this movement was the comparison with Ireland. The original movement broadened its political appeal and soon began to receive Liberal Party backing. In 1885, the post of Secretary for Scotland and the Scottish Office were re-established to promote Scotland's interests and express its concerns to the UK Parliament. In 1886, however, Liberal Prime Minister William Ewart Gladstone introduced the Irish Home Rule Bill. It was not regarded as an immediate constitutional priority however, particularly when the Irish Home Rule Bill was defeated in the House of Commons.

Immediately before the First World War, the Liberal Government led by H. H. Asquith supported the concept of "Home Rule all round", whereby Scottish home rule would follow the Irish home rule proposed in the Government of Ireland Act 1914. Asquith believed that there was an iniquity in that the component parts of the United Kingdom could come together to act together in common purposes, but those components could not deal with internal matters that did not require consent across the UK. This was not a nationalist philosophy, but instead Asquith was acting in the belief that federalism was the "true basis of union" and that centralising power in Westminster was a political blunder. A Scottish Home Rule bill was first presented to Parliament in 1913, but its progress was soon ended as Parliament focused on emergency measures necessitated by the First World War.

Unlike Ireland, which rebelled in the Easter Rising and fought a War of Independence, Scotland did not resist central rule. There was, however, a persistent demand for Scottish home rule. The Scottish Office was relocated to St Andrew's House in Edinburgh during the 1930s. The Scottish Covenant was a petition to the UK Government asking for home rule. It was first proposed in 1930 by John MacCormick and formally written in 1949. The petition "was eventually signed by two million people" (the population of Scotland was recorded as 5,100,000 in the 1951 UK Census). The covenant was ignored by the main political parties. In 1950 the Stone of Destiny was removed from Westminster Abbey by a group of Scottish nationalist students.

The question of full independence, or the less controversial home rule, did not re-enter the political mainstream until 1960, after the famous Wind of Change speech by Conservative Prime Minister Harold Macmillan. This speech marked the start of a rapid decolonisation in Africa and the end of the British Empire. The UK had already suffered the international humiliation of the 1956 Suez Crisis, which showed that it was no longer the superpower it had been before World War II. For many in Scotland, this served to undermine one of the principal raisons d'être for the United Kingdom and also symbolised the end of popular imperialism and the Imperial unity that had united the then-prominent Scottish Unionist Party. The Unionist Party subsequently suffered a steady decline in support.

=== 1979 First devolution referendum ===
The Scottish National Party (SNP) won their second-ever seat in the House of Commons in 1967, when Winnie Ewing was the unexpected winner of the 1967 Hamilton by-election. The seat was previously a safe Labour Party seat, and this victory brought the SNP to national prominence, leading to Edward Heath's 1968 Declaration of Perth and the establishment of the Kilbrandon Commission. The discovery of North Sea oil off the east coast of Scotland in 1970 further invigorated the debate over Scottish independence. The SNP organised a hugely successful campaign entitled "It's Scotland's oil", emphasising how the discovery of oil could benefit Scotland's struggling deindustrialising economy and its populace. At the February 1974 general election, seven SNP MPs were elected. The general election resulted in a hung parliament, so Prime Minister Harold Wilson called a second election for October 1974, when the SNP performed even better than in February, winning 11 seats and obtaining over 30% of the total vote in Scotland.

In January 1974, the Conservative government had commissioned the McCrone report, written by Professor Gavin McCrone, a leading government economist, to report on the viability of an independent Scotland. He concluded that oil would have given an independent Scotland one of the strongest currencies in Europe. The report went on to say that officials advised government ministers on how to take "the wind out of the SNP sails". A common myth regarding the report is that when handed over to the incoming Labour government and classified as secret because of Labour fears over the surge in Scottish National Party popularity, the document came to light only in 2005, when the SNP obtained the report under the Freedom of Information Act 2000. McCrone himself has rejected this claim.

The Labour Party, led by Harold Wilson, won the October 1974 general election with the very narrow majority of only three seats. Following their election to Parliament, the SNP MPs pressed for the creation of a Scottish Assembly: a viewpoint which was given added credibility by the conclusions of the Kilbrandon Commission. However, opponents demanded that a referendum be held on the issue. Although the Labour Party and the Scottish National Party both officially supported devolution, support was split in both parties. Labour was divided between those who favoured devolution and those who wanted to maintain a full central Westminster government. In the SNP, there was division between those who saw devolution as a stepping stone to independence and those who feared it might detract from that ultimate goal. The resignation of Harold Wilson from office in 1976 brought James Callaghan to power, but his small majority was eroded by several by-election losses, and the government became increasingly unpopular. Deals were made with the SNP and Plaid Cymru to hold referendums on devolution in exchange for their support, helping to prolong the government's life.

The result of the referendum in Scotland was a narrow majority in favour of devolution (52% to 48%), but a condition of the referendum was that 40% of the total electorate should vote in favour in order to make it valid. But the turnout was only 63.6%, so only 32.9% of the electorate voted "Yes". The Scotland Act 1978 was consequently repealed in March 1979 by a vote of 301–206 in Parliament. In the wake of the referendum, the supporters of the bill conducted a protest campaign under the slogan "Scotland said yes". They said that the 40% rule was undemocratic and that the referendum results justified the establishment of the assembly. Campaigners for a "No" vote countered that voters had been told before the referendum that failing to vote was as good as a "No". It was therefore incorrect to conclude that the relatively low turnout was entirely due to voter apathy.

In protest, the SNP withdrew their support from the government. A motion of no confidence was then tabled by the Conservatives and supported by the SNP, the Liberals and Ulster Unionists. It passed by one vote on 28 March 1979, forcing the May 1979 general election, which was won by the Conservatives led by Margaret Thatcher. Prime Minister Callaghan described the decision of the SNP to bring down the Labour government as "turkeys voting for Christmas". The SNP group was reduced from 11 MPs to 2 at the 1979 general election, while devolution was opposed by the Conservative governments led by Margaret Thatcher and John Major.

=== 1997 Second devolution referendum ===
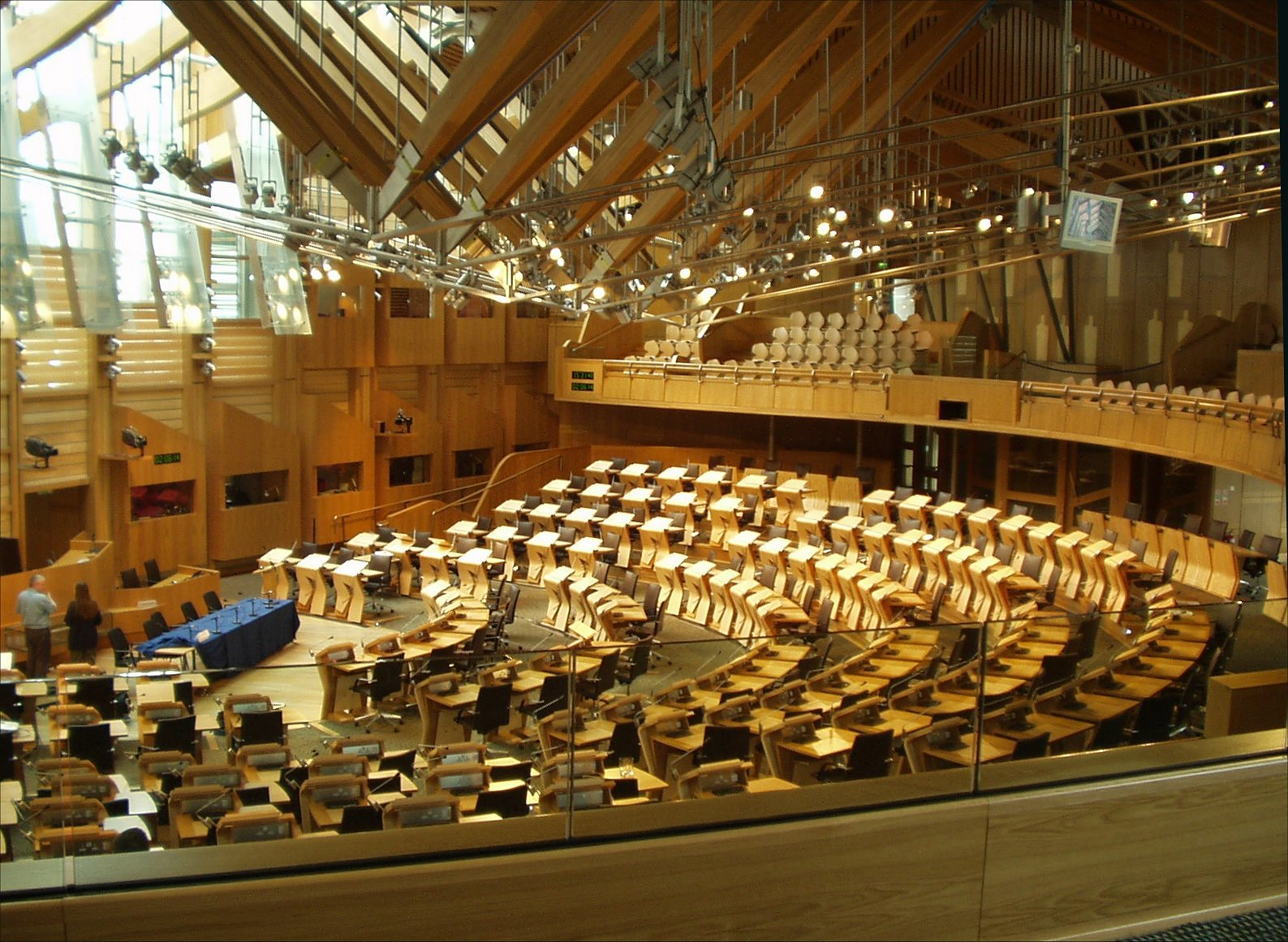
The Debating chamber of the Scottish Parliament, commonly known as Holyrood.

Supporters of Scottish independence continued to hold mixed views on the Home Rule movement, which included many supporters of union who wanted devolution within the framework of the United Kingdom. Some saw it as a stepping stone to independence, while others wanted to go straight for independence.

In the years of the Conservative government after 1979, the Campaign for a Scottish Assembly was established, eventually publishing the Claim of Right 1989. This led to the Scottish Constitutional Convention. The convention promoted consensus on devolution on a cross-party basis, though the Conservative Party refused to co-operate and the Scottish National Party withdrew from the discussions when it became clear that the convention was unwilling to discuss Scottish independence as a constitutional option. Arguments against devolution and the Scottish Parliament, levelled mainly by the Conservative Party, were that the Parliament would create a "slippery slope" to Scottish independence and provide the pro-independence Scottish National Party with a route to government. Prime Minister John Major campaigned during the 1997 general election on the slogan "72 hours to save the union". His party ultimately suffered the worst electoral defeat in 91 years.

The Labour Party won the 1997 general election in a landslide, and Donald Dewar as Secretary of State for Scotland agreed to the proposals for a Scottish Parliament. A referendum was held in September and 74.3% of those who voted approved the devolution plan (44.87% of the electorate). The Parliament of the United Kingdom subsequently approved the Scotland Act 1998 which created an elected Scottish Parliament with control over most domestic policy. In May 1999, Scotland held its first election for a devolved parliament, and in July 1999, the Scottish Parliament held session for the first time since the previous parliament had been adjourned in 1707, after a gap of 292 years. Donald Dewar of the Labour Party subsequently became the First Minister of Scotland, while the Scottish National Party became the main opposition party. The egalitarian song "A Man's A Man for A' That", by Robert Burns, was performed at the opening ceremony.

The Scottish Parliament is a unicameral legislature comprising 129 members. 73 members (57 pc) represent individual constituencies and are elected on a first past the post system. 56 members (43 pc) are elected in eight different electoral regions by the Additional-member system. Members serve for a four-year term. The monarch appoints one Member of the Scottish Parliament, on the nomination of the Parliament, to be First Minister, with the convention being that the leader of the party with the largest number of seats is appointed First Minister, although any member who can command the confidence of a majority of the chamber could conceivably be appointed First Minister. All other Ministers are appointed and dismissed by the First Minister, and together they make up the Scottish Government, the executive arm of government.

The Scottish Parliament has legislative authority for all non-reserved matters relating to Scotland, and has a limited power to vary income tax, nicknamed the Tartan Tax, a power it did not exercise and which was later replaced by wider tax-varying powers. The Scottish Parliament can refer devolved matters back to Westminster to be considered as part of United Kingdom-wide legislation by passing a Legislative consent motion if United Kingdom-wide legislation is considered to be more appropriate for certain issues. The programmes of legislation enacted by the Scottish Parliament since 1999 have seen a divergence in the provision of public services compared to the rest of the United Kingdom. For instance, the costs of a university education, and care services for the elderly are free at point of use in Scotland, while fees are paid in the rest of the UK. Scotland was the first country in the UK to ban smoking in enclosed public places in March 2006.

=== 2014 independence referendum ===
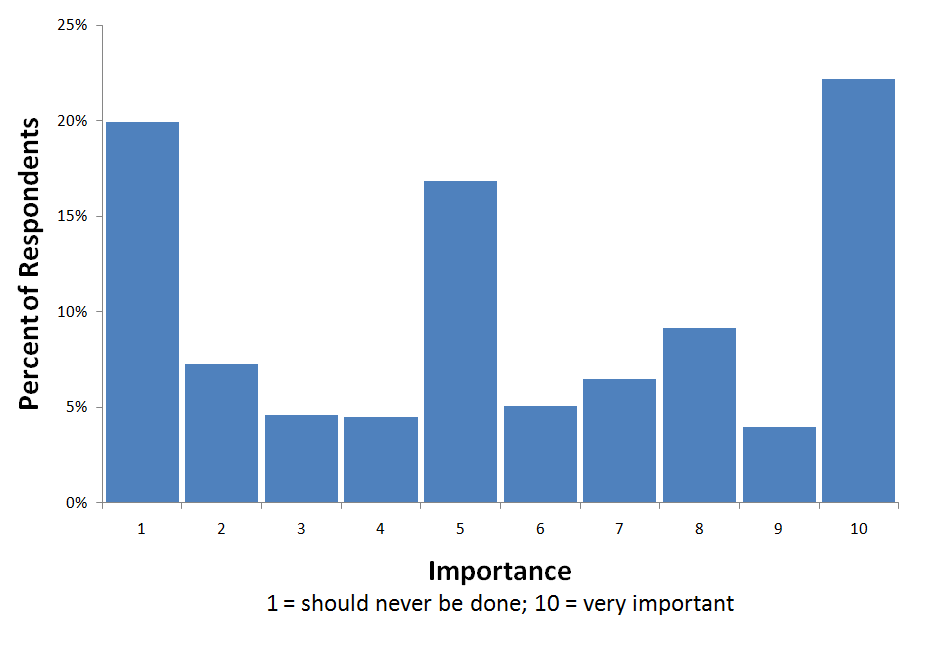
Survey of the importance of holding a referendum, carried out by the BBC in April 2011.

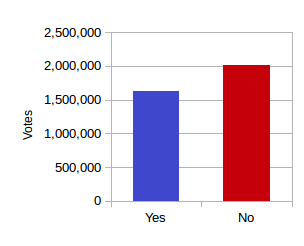
Referendum result

In its manifesto for the 2007 Scottish Parliament election, the Scottish National Party (SNP) pledged to hold an independence referendum by 2010. After winning the election, the SNP-controlled Scottish Government published a white paper entitled "Choosing Scotland's Future", which outlined options for the future of Scotland, including independence. Scottish Labour, the Scottish Conservatives and Scottish Liberal Democrats opposed a referendum offering independence as an option. Prime Minister Gordon Brown also publicly attacked the independence option. The three main parties opposed to independence instead formed a Commission on Scottish Devolution, chaired by Kenneth Calman. This reviewed devolution and considered all constitutional options apart from independence. In August 2009, the Scottish Government announced that the Referendum (Scotland) Bill, 2010, which would detail the question and conduct of a possible referendum on the issue of independence, would be part of its legislative programme for 2009–10. The Bill was not expected to be passed, because of the SNP's status as a minority government and the opposition of all other major parties in Parliament. In September 2010, the Scottish Government announced that no referendum would occur before the 2011 Scottish Parliament election.

The SNP won an overall majority in the Scottish Parliament at the 2011 Scottish election. First Minister Alex Salmond stated his desire to hold a referendum "in the second half of the parliament", which would place it in 2014 or 2015. In January 2012, the UK Government offered to provide the Scottish Parliament with the specific powers to hold a referendum, providing it was "fair, legal and decisive". Negotiations continued between the two governments until October 2012, when the Edinburgh Agreement was reached. The Scottish Independence Referendum (Franchise) Act 2013 was passed by the Scottish Parliament on 27 June 2013 and received Royal Assent on 7 August 2013. On 15 November 2013, the Scottish Government published Scotland's Future, a 670-page white paper laying out the case for independence and the means through which Scotland might become an independent country.

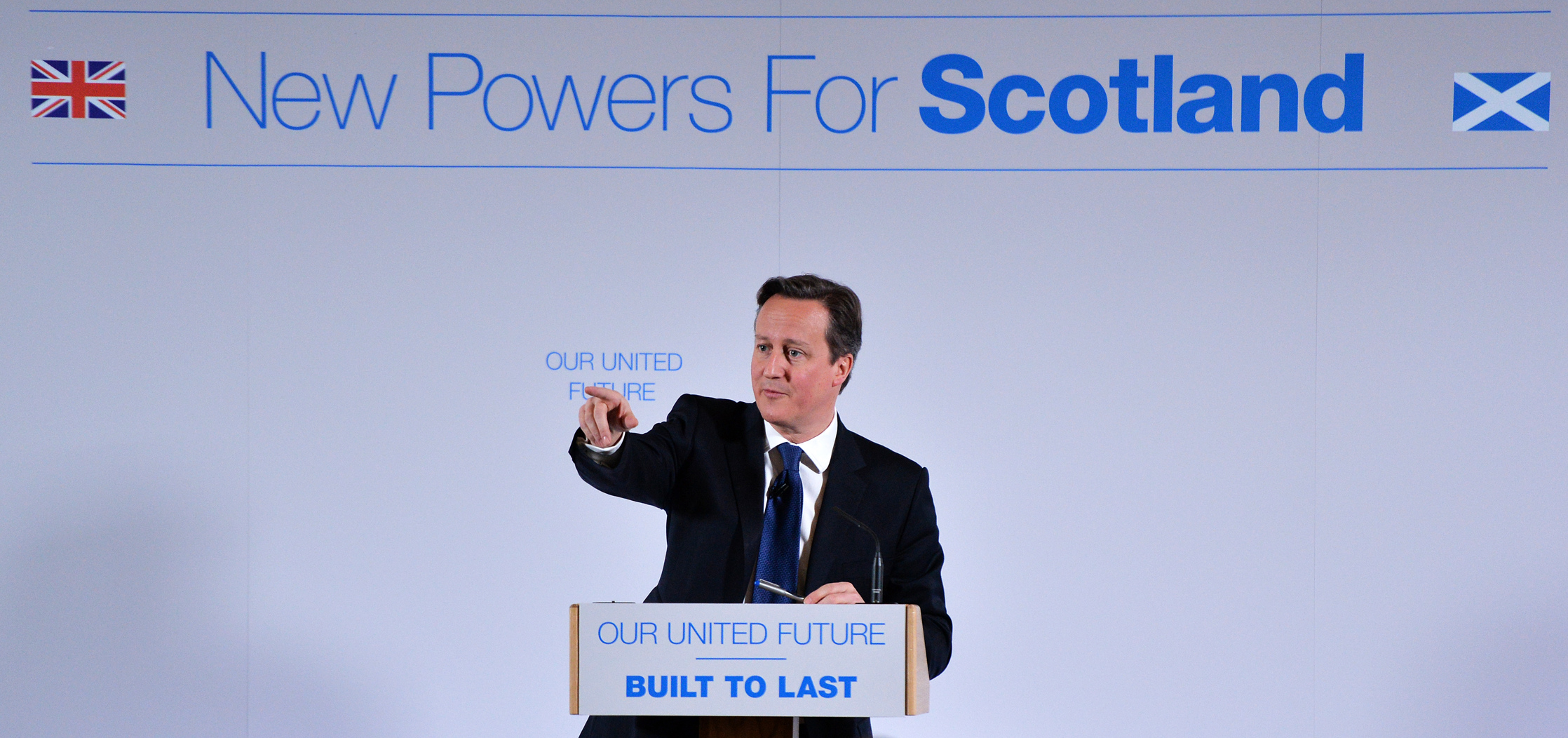
UK Prime Minister David Cameron in Edinburgh to discuss the new powers that Scotland would obtain through the Scotland Act 2016

Following a protracted period of negotiation, a public debate between Salmond and Better Together leader Alistair Darling was arranged. On the morning before the televised debate, a joint statement, pledging greater devolved powers to Scotland in the event of a "No" vote, was signed by Prime Minister David Cameron (Leader of the Conservative Party), Deputy Prime Minister Nick Clegg (Leader of the Liberal Democrats), and Leader of the Opposition Ed Miliband (Leader of the Labour Party).

The BBC website announced the final result of the referendum at 06:24 on 19 September 2014: the "No" vote prevailed with 55% (2,001,926) of the votes from an overall voter turnout of 84.5%. Chief counting officer Mary Pitcaithly stated: "It is clear that the majority of people voting have voted No to the referendum question." The "Yes" vote received 45% (1,617,989) support—the winning total needed was 1,852,828. Results were compiled from 32 council areas, with Glasgow backing independence—voting 53.5% "Yes" to 46.5% "No" (turnout in the area was 75%)—and Edinburgh voting against independence by 61% to 39% (turnout in the area was 84%). Darling stated in his post-result speech, "The silent have spoken", while Salmond stated, "I accept the verdict of the people, and I call on all of Scotland to follow suit in accepting the democratic verdict".

=== UK withdrawal from the European Union ===
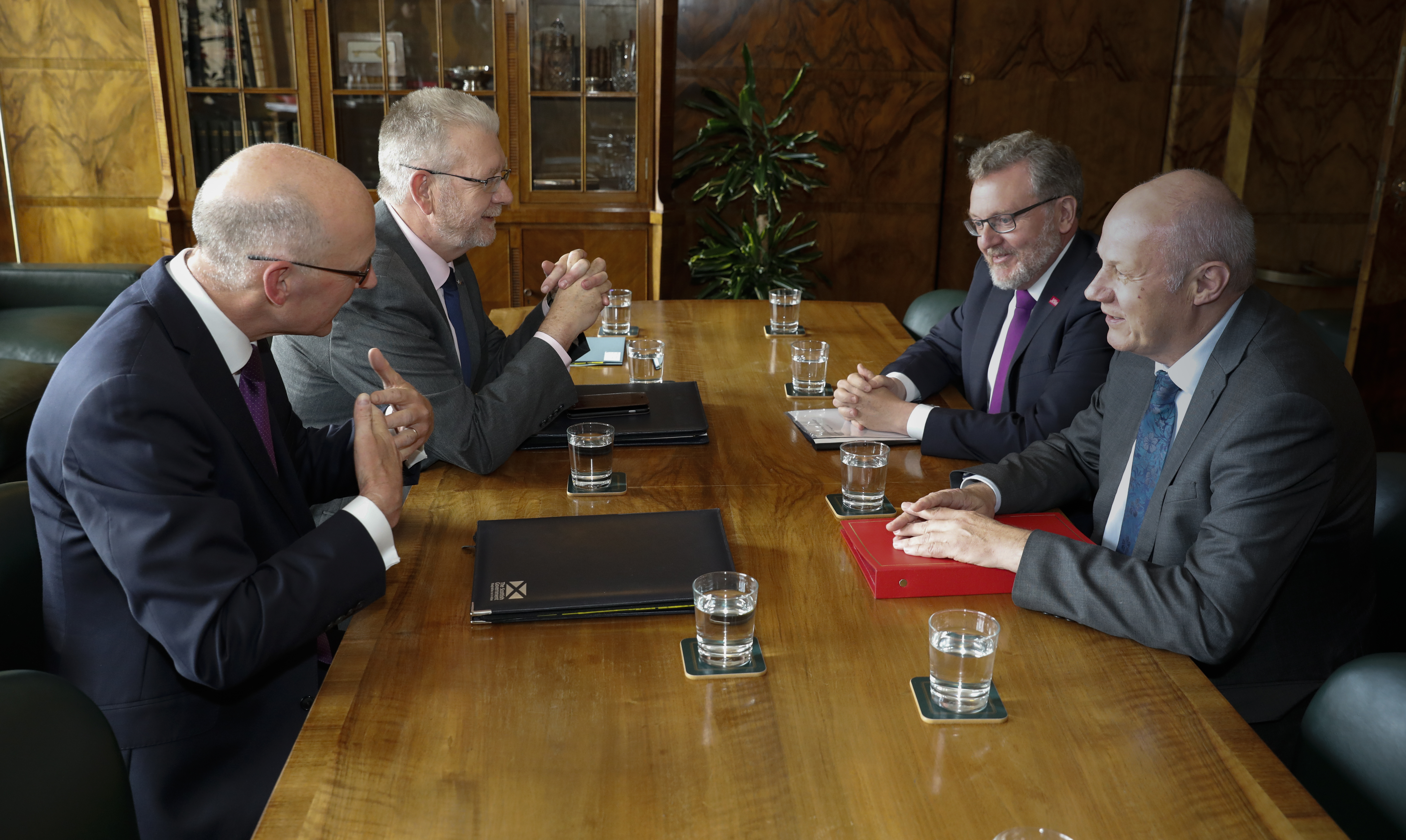
Ministers from the Scottish and UK Governments meet to discuss Brexit, 2017

In 2016, the UK voted to leave the EU in the Brexit referendum, however Scotland voted to remain by 62% to 38%. Leading pro-independence figures suggested a second independence referendum. For example, First Minister of Scotland Nicola Sturgeon said that she was looking at all options to "secure our place in the EU", and that a second referendum was "highly likely". However, a spokesperson for Prime Minister Theresa May said that "The prime minister and the government does not believe that there is a mandate for [a second referendum]. There was one only two years ago. There was an extremely high turnout and there was a resounding result in favour of Scotland remaining in the UK".

At the 2019 United Kingdom general election, the SNP won 48 out of 59 Scottish seats. Sturgeon asked Prime Minister Boris Johnson for his consent to hold another referendum. However, Johnson declined her request. He said that Sturgeon and her predecessor Alex Salmond had promised that the 2014 referendum would be a "once in a generation" vote.

Shortly before the UK left the European single market, the Boris Johnson regime sought through the United Kingdom Internal Market Act 2020 to restrict the legislative competence of the Scottish Parliament. The primary purpose of the act is to constrain the capacity of the devolved institutions to use their regulatory autonomy. The legislation undermines the capability of the Scottish legislature to make different economic or social choices from those made in Westminster. In a January 2021 editorial concerning rising support for independence and its potential to break up the union, the Financial Times indicates that the Internal Market Act may serve to further the cause of independence:

An example of what not to do was the government’s Internal Market Act, in which London retook control of structural funds previously disbursed by the EU.

This view was mirrored by the Scottish Government in a report published in March 2021, which states that the act is "radically undermining the powers and democratic accountability of the Scottish Parliament."

=== 2021 Scottish elections ===
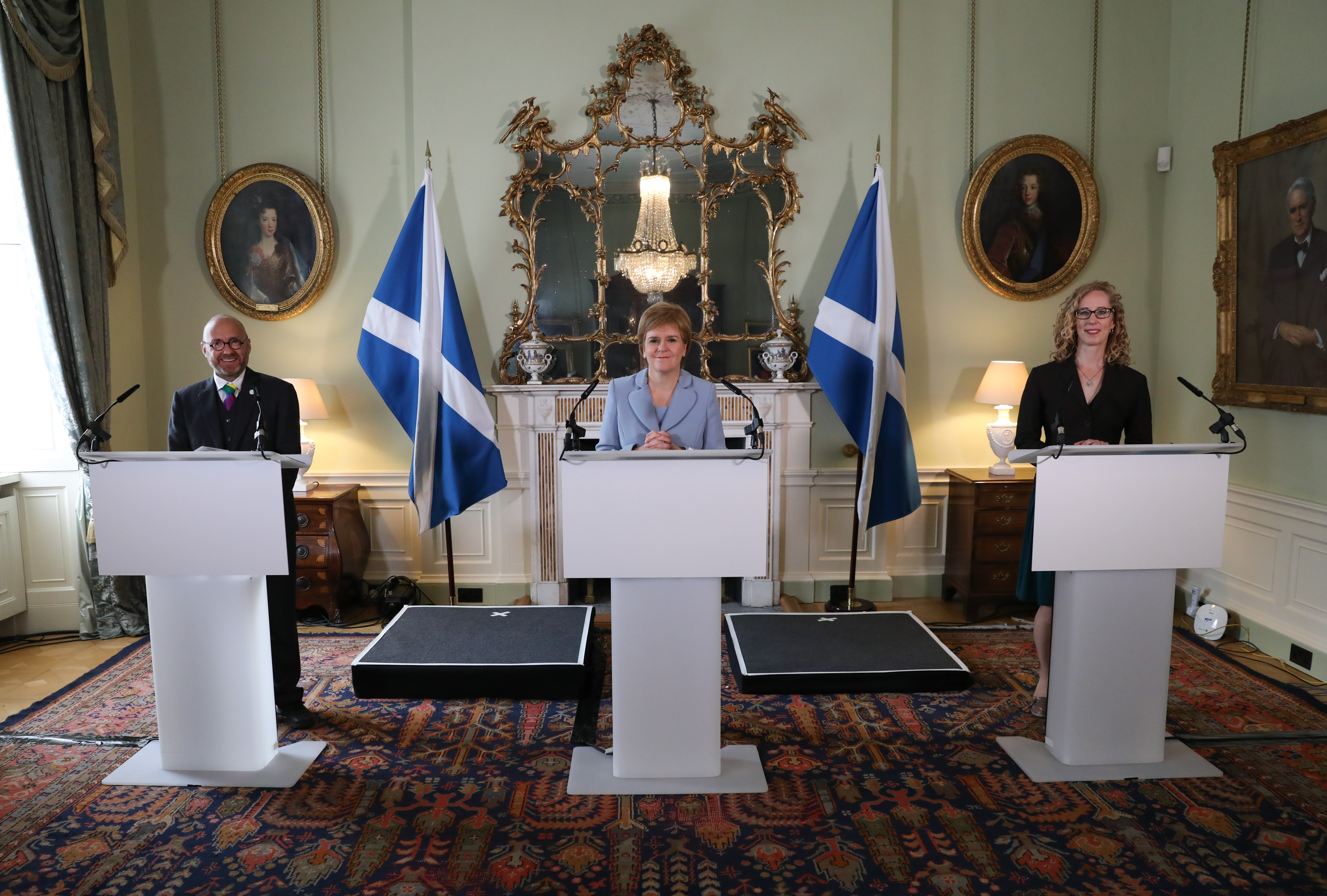
Following the 2021 election, the SNP and Scottish Greens agreed a power sharing agreement known as the Bute House Agreement, giving the SNP government a majority in the Scottish Parliament

In January 2021, Nicola Sturgeon said that another referendum would be held if pro-independence parties won a majority of seats at the 2021 Scottish Parliament election. Opposition parties criticised the SNP, stating that they were putting independence ahead of the ongoing COVID-19 pandemic. Although the SNP fell one seat short of winning outright, the eight seats won by the Scottish Greens meant that pro-independence parties had won a majority of seats in the election. Speaking after the election, both SNP and Conservative representatives said that a referendum would not occur during the ongoing COVID-19 pandemic.

The Scottish Government planned to hold a second independence referendum before the subsequent Scottish Parliament election. Nicola Sturgeon indicated the vote would be held by 2023. Boris Johnson stated that he would not grant authorisation for a referendum, but the SNP indicated it was prepared to hold a referendum regardless. According to a poll of 1000 voters conducted for Politico Europe, 43% said they agreed that Scotland should only hold a second independence referendum if the U.K. government agrees to it.

In January 2022, The Herald reported that the Scottish Government were paying eleven civil servants a total of £700,000 per year to plan for Scottish independence. In its response to the newspaper, the government stated "As set out in the 2021/22 Programme for Government (PfG), the Scottish Government will work to ensure that a legitimate and constitutional referendum can be held within this Parliament, and if the Covid crisis is over, within the first half of this Parliament." The Scottish Conservatives constitution spokesperson Donald Cameron and Scottish Liberal Democrats leader Alex Cole-Hamilton opposed the spending. Cole-Hamilton said "to spend more than £500,000 on a fool's errand of another prospectus for independence makes it less of a white paper and more of a white elephant" and suggested the SNP and Green Party are "off their rockers". SNP President Michael Russell remarked that the SNP and Green Party's victory in the election indicated they have a mandate to hold a second referendum to make Scotland an independent country.

=== Proposed 2023 independence referendum ===
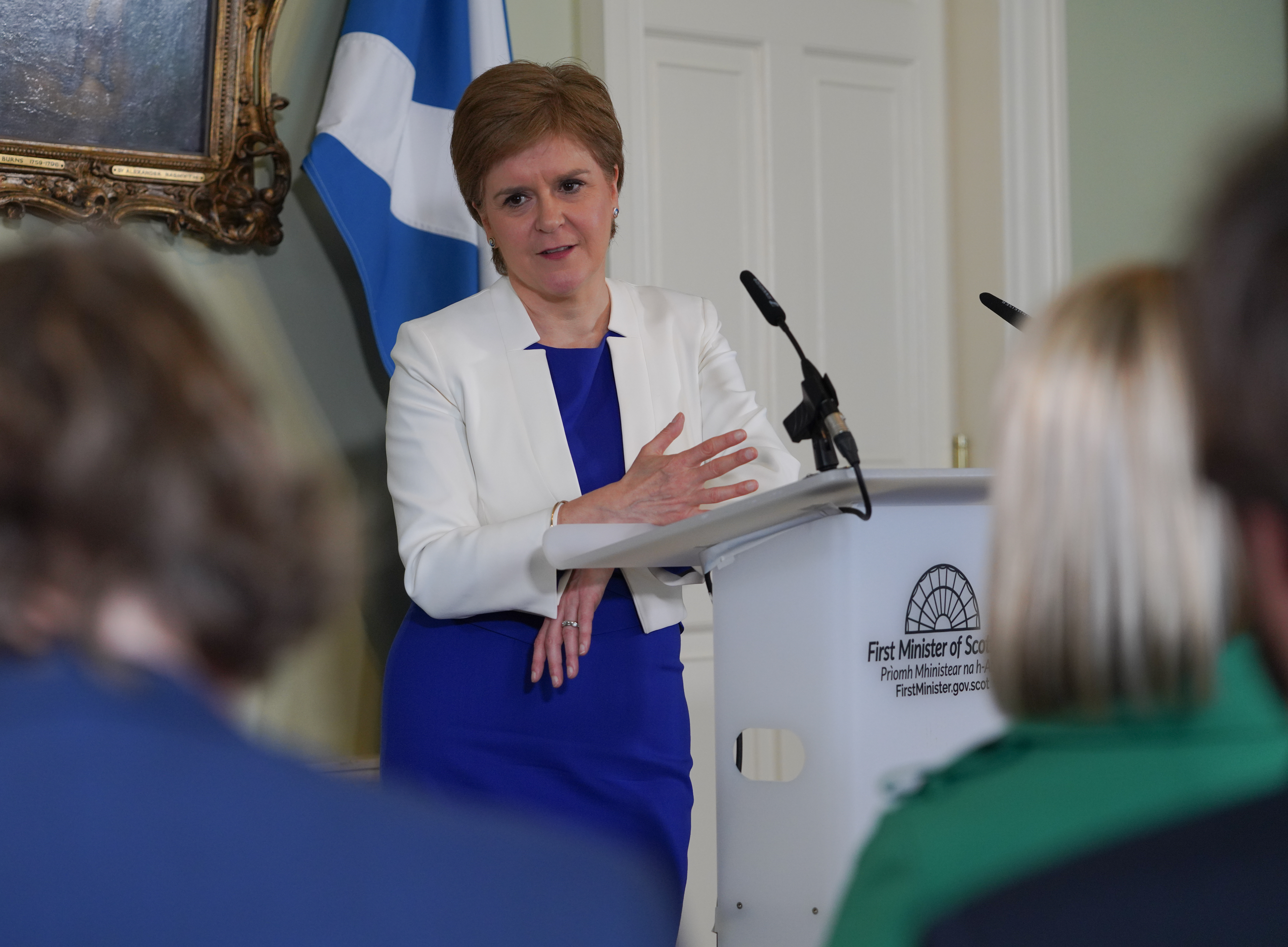
The Scottish Government began publishing independence prospectus papers, Building a New Scotland, under First Minister Nicola Sturgeon in 2022

On 28 June 2022, First Minister Nicola Sturgeon proposed to hold a second Scottish independence referendum on 19 October 2023, provided that the legality and constitutionality of the referendum is guaranteed. She set out a three-stage process, starting with the Scottish Government making a request for a Section 30 order (parliamentary powers) to hold a referendum. If that was rejected, it would ask the UK Supreme Court to adjudicate whether the Scottish Parliament could legislate for a referendum without that transfer of powers. If that was also rejected, she wished to turn the next UK general election into a "de facto" referendum.

A week later, Prime Minister Boris Johnson rejected the request for a Section 30 transfer of powers. The Scottish Government lodged a case with the Supreme Court to determine whether the powers to hold a referendum are within the competence of the Scottish Parliament. A hearing took place on 11 and 12 October 2022, and a month later the Supreme Court ruled that the Scottish Parliament does not have the power to legislate for an independence referendum.

Before the Supreme Court hearing Nicola Sturgeon said that, in the eventuality of the Court ruling that the Scottish Parliament did not have the authority to act unilaterally, the SNP would contest the next UK general election as a de facto referendum on independence. This tactic has been previously used by Irish and Catalan nationalists. It has been criticised on the grounds that "elections and [...] referendums [...] are quite distinct" and that general elections "[are] often about a range of issues" and "it's not for a political party to dictate the terms of an election". Prof Jim Gallagher, chair of Our Scottish Future, said that "whatever UK government emerges won't treat it as having been an independence referendum".

=== 2026 election and aftermath ===
Ahead of the 2026 Scottish Parliament election, First Minister John Swinney said in September 2025 that the UK Government should commit to granting a second referendum on independence should the SNP win a majority at the election. Speaking at an event in Edinburgh, Swinney urged the population of Scotland to "come together and demand a say over our future". UK Prime Minister Starmer claimed that he does not foresee the SNP winning a majority at the Scottish Parliament election, and accused Swinney of engaging in "distraction politics". Since the 2014 referendum, unionist politicians have argued against a second referendum on the basis that the vote in 2014 was billed as a "once in a generation" opportunity, which Swinney disputes. In an interview with the BBC, he claimed that "by 2030 there would be one million young Scots eligible to vote who were too young to participate in the 2014 referendum", further commenting "that seems like a generation to me".

On 4 September 2025, the Scottish Government published the Your Right to Decide paper, which set out the governments prospectus on Scottish independence following a second referendum and establishes the view that "it is for the people of Scotland to decide on their constitutional future". In the paper, the Scottish Government establishes the United Kingdom as a "voluntary union of nations", and therefore argues that Scotland should have the ability to decide whether to leave the voluntary union arrangement which established the United Kingdom of Great Britain following the signing of the Treaty of Union 1707 by the Parliament of Scotland and its English counterpart.

The election itself resulted in 72 out of 129 MSPs being elected to represent pro-independence parties. On 26 May 2026, a motion by the Scottish Parliament to call on Westminster to "to make a Section 30 order under the Scotland Act 1998 to devolve the powers to the Scottish Parliament to hold a referendum on Scottish independence" passed in a 72 to 55 vote. The UK government refused to grant it.

In late July after securing the role of prime minister following Sir Keir Starmer's resignation, newly installed Prime Minister Andy Burnham reiterated that a second independence referendum was "off limits" during talks at the commonwealth games in Glasgow.

On 28 August 2026, the Scottish Government published its draft independence referendum bill. The UK government again rejected proposals reaffirming its late July statement. On 9 September, Andy Burnham suggested that a referendum could take place if public opinion demanded it, drawing a parallel between the situation in Scotland and Northern Ireland. Under the Good Friday Agreement, a referendum on whether Northern Ireland should become part of Ireland or remain within the UK should be held "when there is a clear consensus in the country, when public opinion has changed to the point where the call has to be considered." He later stated that no such consensus currently existed in Scotland, and therefore an independence referendum remained 'off limits'.

On 15 September the First Ministers of Scotland, Wales and Northern Ireland met to sign a formal agreement "to prepare, plan and facilitate constitutional change" in their respective nations. This agreement reflects the fact that, for the first time, all three devolved governments are led by First Ministers whose parties ultimately seek independence from the UK.

== Legal position ==
=== Power to declare independence ===
While in Northern Ireland, the system of devolution includes a provision for independence referendums, under the Scottish devolution framework, there is no equivalent provision. Therefore, Scottish independence would need to be enacted exceptionally by a competent authority. Due to the UK having no codified constitution, there is dispute over which authorities have competence to enact Scottish independence.

The UK Parliament retains parliamentary sovereignty over the United Kingdom as a whole. Under this principle, the UK Parliament could enact Scottish independence without the need for a referendum. In AXA General Insurance Ltd and others v HM Advocate and others, the Deputy President of the Supreme Court, Lord Hope of Craighead, stated that "the sovereignty of the Crown in Parliament [...] is the bedrock of the British constitution. Sovereignty remains with the United Kingdom Parliament." However, the application of the principle of parliamentary sovereignty to Scotland has been disputed. In MacCormick v Lord Advocate, the Lord President of the Court of Session, Lord Cooper of Culross stated obiter dicta that "the principle of the unlimited sovereignty of Parliament is a distinctively English principle which has no counterpart in Scottish Constitutional Law." It has been suggested that the doctrine of popular sovereignty, proclaimed in the 1320 Declaration of Arbroath, articulated by Scottish political thinkers like George Buchanan and reasserted by the Claim of Right 1989 (signed by nearly every Labour and Liberal Democrat MP in Scotland at the time), is of greater relevance to Scotland.

Some lawyers have said that Parliament cannot repeal the Acts of Union because the Treaty of Union is a treaty in international law, made by two no longer existing, independent states. The law scholar David Walker wrote that regardless of any amendment or repeal of the Acts, the Treaty would remain in force because Parliament cannot alter the terms of international treaties. Professors James Crawford and Alan Boyle write that it is unlikely the Treaty of Union can be considered a treaty, but rather, as Smith wrote, it was a 'record of negotiations' and that the UK could not 'be bound by a treaty to which it was not party'. This notion that Parliament cannot amend the terms of the Union's creation is challenged by the fact that the Acts have been successfully amended by the Parliament several times. David Walker writes that simply because Parliament purports to amend an Act does not mean it has done so. When HM Government ratifies a treaty, it does not however bring it into domestic law, it only creates certain rights or duties for the Government. An Act is only brought into domestic law by Parliament legislating thus. According to a 2017 Supreme Court ruling, ministers cannot make changes to UK constitutional arrangements without an Act of Parliament. There is no legal role for the Scottish Parliament or Government in treaties and under devolution, treaty-making is the sole responsibility of the UK Government.

The legality of any UK constituent country attaining de facto independence or declaring unilateral independence outside the framework of British constitutional convention is debatable. Under international law, a unilateral declaration might satisfy the principle of the "declarative theory of statehood", but not the "constitutive theory of statehood". Some legal opinion following the Supreme Court of Canada's decision on what steps Quebec would need to take to secede is that Scotland would be unable to unilaterally declare independence under international law if the UK Government permitted a referendum on an unambiguous question on secession. The SNP have not sought a unilateral act, but rather state that a positive vote for independence in a referendum would have "enormous moral and political force... impossible for a future [Westminster] government to ignore", and hence would give the Scottish Government a mandate to negotiate for the passage of an act of the UK Parliament providing for Scotland's secession, in which Westminster renounces its sovereignty over Scotland.

The Charter of the United Nations enshrines the right of peoples to self-determination, and the Universal Declaration of Human Rights also guarantees peoples' right to change nationality; the UK is a signatory to both documents. Politicians in both the Scottish and UK parliaments have endorsed the right of the Scottish people to self-determination, including former UK Prime Ministers John Major and Margaret Thatcher.

=== Power to hold an independence referendum ===
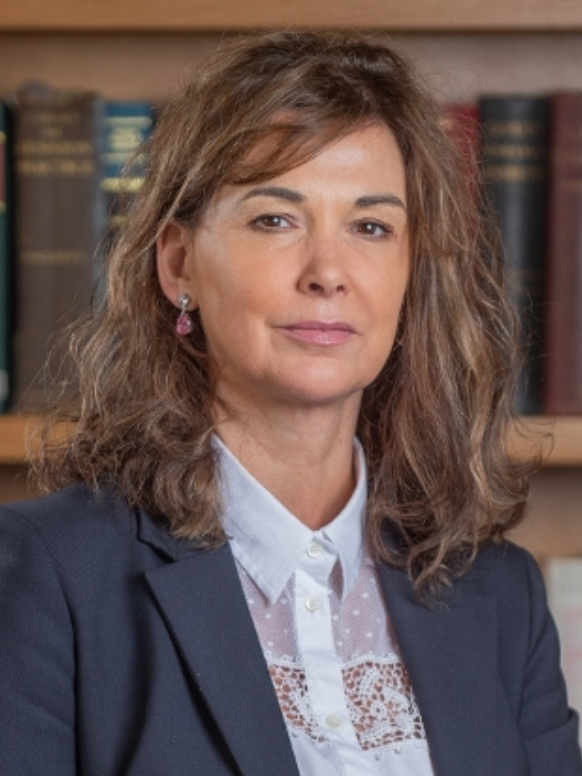
The Lord Advocate, Dorothy Bain, argued the Scottish Government's case for the granting of a Section 30 order before the Supreme Court in October 2022

The issue of the Scottish Government's power to hold and the Scottish Parliament's competence to legislate for an independence referendum is a subject of intense debate both inside and outside Scotland. In November 2022 the UK Supreme Court gave a judgment that the Scottish Parliament does not have the power to legislate for an independence referendum. The Scotland Act 1998 reserved powers over "the Union of the Kingdoms of Scotland and England" to the UK Parliament. Any provision is outwith the competence of the Scottish Parliament if "it relates to reserved matters" under Section 29(2) of the Act. This formed the basis of the UK Supreme Court's judgment on the Scottish Parliament's competence to legislate on the matter.

To ensure the undisputed constitutional legality of the 2014 Scottish independence referendum, the Scottish and UK Governments signed the Edinburgh Agreement stating that both would accept and "continue to work together constructively in the light of the outcome [of the referendum], whatever it is, in the best interests of the people of Scotland and of the rest of the United Kingdom". The agreement, with the subsequent approval of the UK Parliament, gave the Scottish Parliament special legal authority to hold an independence referendum before the end of 2014.

No such agreement has been reached in respect of a second referendum, throwing doubt over its legal status. In December 2019, Martin Keatings, a pro-independence independent candidate, sought a declarator to the Court of Session. However Lady Carmichael said the case lacked standing due to its hypothetical nature. Nevertheless, Mr Keatings brought an appeal forward in April 2021 as the Scottish Government had now published a bill, however this appeal was lost.

With the publication of the draft Independence Referendum Bill on 22 March 2021 the question of legality was raised again. On 28 June 2022, Sturgeon proposed to hold a referendum in 2023, provided that the legality and constitutionality of the referendum is guaranteed. The Scottish Government stated that their proposed referendum is "consultative, not self-executing". In UK law, a referendum can be consultative (such as the Brexit referendum) or determinative (such as the AV referendum, which, if passed, would have automatically brought in provisions for the Alternative Vote). The Scotland Act does not explicitly state whether non-binding referendums on reserve powers were reserved. In the Scottish Government's written case published in July 2022, the Lord Advocate observed that "... it may be argued that the Union of the Kingdoms of Scotland and England has been superseded as a matter of law and exists only as an historical fact. The [Scotland Act] would therefore reserve something that no longer exists."

The Scottish Government lodged a case with the Supreme Court to determine whether the powers to hold a referendum are within the competence of the Scottish Parliament, and a hearing took place on 11 and 12 October 2022. A month later, the UK Supreme Court gave a judgment that the Scottish Parliament does not have the power to hold an independence referendum because it relates to the Union of England and Scotland and the sovereignty of the UK Parliament, which are matters reserved to the UK Parliament.

Section 30 requests by the Scottish Government to hold a second referendum have been declined by the UK government, including in March 2017 and May 2026.

== Issues ==
=== Culture ===
In 2014, the Scottish Government wrote that "[Scotland's] approach [to culture] has been, and will continue to be, distinct from that of Westminster". The Scottish Government position was that Scottish independence would give the Scottish Government more powers to encourage culture and creative sectors. In the event of independence, the Scottish Government planned to increase domestic creative production opportunities, such as by setting up a new national broadcaster, while maintaining access to current TV channels and with no additional cost to viewers and listeners.

=== Democracy ===
The concept of a democratic deficit is the most frequently invoked argument in favour of independence. England has a majority (84%) of the UK population. Thus, constituency results for Scotland rarely affect the outcome of general elections. From the 1960s onwards, average voting patterns in Scotland and England have diverged. Scotland has only elected a majority of governing MPs in three of the 11 UK general elections since 1979. Devolution was intended to close this deficit, but Brexit, which happened despite 62% of voters in Scotland voting against it, has highlighted this concern. The Conservative Party, which often forms the UK Government by winning general elections, has not won a plurality of seats in Scotland since 1955.

Underpinning the democratic deficit argument is an assumption that Scotland is a nation with a right to self-determination. Were Scotland independent, Scotland's population would possess full decision-making power in regard to the political affairs of its nation. Alex Salmond stated in a May 2012 launch that "the people who live in Scotland are best placed to make the decisions that affect Scotland."

In January 2023, the UK Government blocked the Gender Recognition Reform (Scotland) Bill from going to royal assent after it passed the Scottish Parliament 86 to 39. The UK Government overruled the bill by using for the first ever time Section 35 powers under the Scotland Act; the justification for the move was that they believed it would impact equalities legislation, which is reserved to Westminster. Nicola Sturgeon responded, arguing that the block had 'no grounds' and constituted a 'full-frontal attack on democracy'.

=== Nationality and citizenship ===
The United Kingdom is a plurinational, rather than multinational, state, where overlapping national identities exist. According to Keating, both Scottishness and Britishness can be understood as a national identity and one can hold one of them alone or both at the same time. Many people in Scotland have multiple national identities. 59% in Scotland surveyed by the BBC in 2018 said they felt strongly British, though the figure is lower than the equivalent in Wales (79%) and England (82%). However, the majority of Scots feel closer affinity to a Scottish, rather than a British national identity. In a 2021 survey, when asked about their national identity and only allowed to pick one option, 64% of Scottish residents identify as Scottish and 29% as British. Furthermore, many in Scotland do not feel a national affinity to the UK at all. In a poll taken in early 2021 by Panelbase, a third of respondents in Scotland said they felt Scottish but not British.

A category of 'Scottish citizenship' does not currently exist, as nationality law is reserved to Westminster. In the event of independence, Scotland and the rest of the UK would need to set new citizenship laws to allocate British and/or Scottish citizenship to existing British citizens and set out Scotland's new nationality laws. For the 2014 referendum, the Yes side said Scotland would tolerate dual citizenship. British citizens habitually resident in Scotland and Scottish-born British citizens elsewhere would have been able to become Scottish citizens automatically. SNP MP Pete Wishart said in 2013 that Scots would 'of course' be able to keep a UK passport, but Home Secretary Theresa May said Scots may not have that option.

=== Economy ===
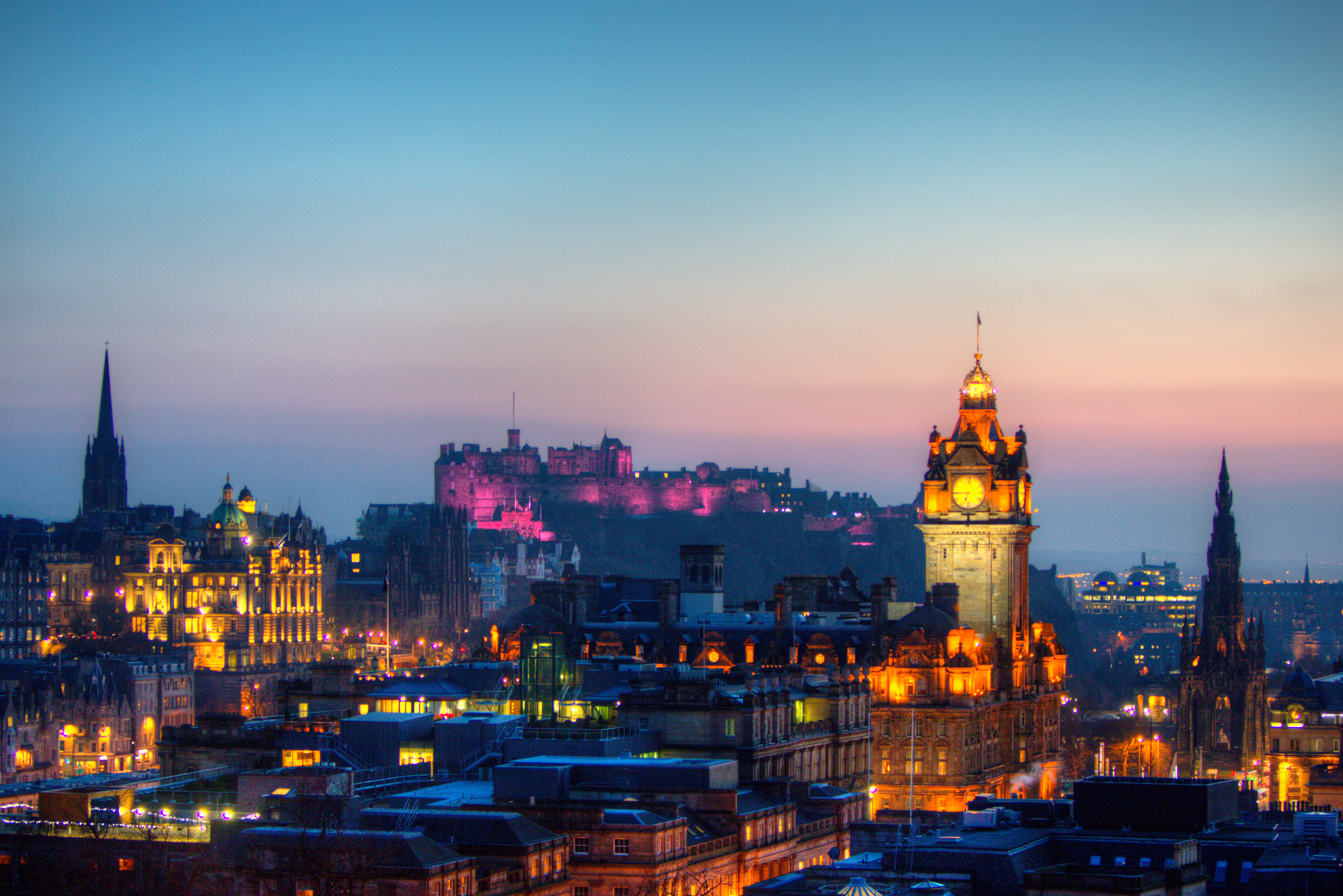
Edinburgh, Scotland's capital city and financial centre, the fourth largest financial hub in Europe

Independence would mean a much greater change for business than devolution. While Scottish nationalists generally assert that independence would not be economically disruptive, unionists and the UK government tend to assert the opposite. Journalist Peter Jones writes that calculating the real economic impacts of independence (i.e. whether Scotland would be richer or poorer outwith the UK) is "an extremely hazard, if not impossible, task".

If businesses concluded that independence would yield benefits, there could be positive economic effects. However, if businesses do not, they could postpone spending or investment plans or even leave Scotland entirely. Uncertainty caused by independence referendums can also have negative implications for financial markets and the wider economy, depending on the likelihood that separation wins. This uncertainty has impacts not only in Scotland, but in the whole of the UK. Due to the relative size of Scotland in the UK, any negative economic effects would be felt worse in Scotland.

Economic modelling by the Centre for Economic Performance found that independence would hit Scotland's economy ‘two to three times’ harder than Brexit. According to their model, leaving the UK after Brexit could reduce Scottish income per capita between 6.5 per cent and 8.7 per cent, depending on trade barriers. Rejoining the EU would do little to mitigate the costs of Brexit, because the cost of removing trade barriers with the EU is outweighed by the cost of erecting trade barriers with the UK. Scotland's largest trading partner is the rest of the UK, which accounts for £51.2 billion in exported goods and services, compared to only £16.1 billion to EU countries. According to Nicola Sturgeon, a customs border with the rest of the UK would be needed. 42% of those in Scotland think it would be financially worse off outside the Union (compared to 36% who think it would be better).

==== Natural resources ====
The nationalist position is that only an independent Scotland can fully utilise and exploit its national resources, including North Sea oil and gas, for the benefit of its population. According to the Scottish Government led by Alex Salmond in 2014, 64% of the EU's oil reserves existed in Scottish waters, while the David Hume Institute think tank estimated that "Scotland is sitting on oil and gas reserves worth up to £4 trillion". Investment in and production from the North Sea oilfields dropped sharply after Conservative chancellor George Osborne imposed punitive taxes, undercutting the projected revenue an independent Scotland could claim.

David Maddox, writing for The Scotsman in 2008, pointed to a future Peak oil decline in North Sea oil revenue, within ten years oil revenue had fallen to 10% of the 2008 peak. Some, such as Ruth Davidson of the Scottish Conservatives, wish to reduce public spending and devolve more fiscal powers to the Scottish Parliament in order to address this issue within the broader framework of the Union. Outlying regions such as Orkney, Shetland and the Western Isles would be disadvantaged or deserve a greater share of oil revenue.

==== Public finances ====
An independent Scotland would have full autonomy over decisions on tax, spending and borrowing. Scotland would be able to issue sovereign debt and set fiscal limits. According to the Scottish Government, it is clear that Scotland currently pays its way within the UK. The Scottish Government has proposed setting up a 'New Scotland Fund' to provide capital investment and boost growth. According to the charity Institute for Fiscal Studies, this fund would likely need to be funded by additional borrowing.

In 2012, the Scottish Government's Finance Secretary John Swinney prepared a confidential cabinet briefing paper on the financial impact of Scottish independence. The report warned that an independent Scotland would face public spending cuts, lower pensions and welfare spending, and high levels of debt. The paper indicated that an independent Scotland would face a significant budget deficit of £28 billion, and would inherit a higher proportion of the UK national debt than ministers had publicly acknowledged, with debt interest payments potentially costing taxpayers in Scotland £5.2 billion in 2016-17. The report warned that Scotland's public finances would be heavily dependent on volatile and declining oil revenues, and suggested that the affordability of the state pension in an independent Scotland would be at risk. The report further warned that the SNP's plans for an oil fund under independence would "require some downward revision in current spending." Swinney's cabinet paper was kept secret before being leaked to the press in 2013, a year after it was drafted. In her 2025 memoir Frankly, Nicola Sturgeon, who had served as Deputy First Minister at the time, acknowledged that Swinney's leaked briefing paper had encouraged the Scottish Government to "cast the opening finances of an independent Scotland in as positive a light as possible", and admitted that government economists had been pressured to push their projections of oil revenues higher.

According to an analysis by the Financial Times, an independent Scotland would have a large hole in its public finances. The paper's analysis suggests this would be due to the combined effect of lower than expected tax revenues, Brexit and the COVID-19 pandemic, which have increased the country's budget deficit. A publication by the charity Institute for Fiscal Studies claims that in 2020-21 (during the COVID-19 pandemic), the national deficit of Scotland was between 22% and 25% of national income, though this is predicted to fall after the pandemic. The same publication claims that if it leaves the UK by the middle of the decade, Scotland would have a deficit of almost 10 per cent of GDP. If correct, this would mean Scotland would need to raise taxes or cut public spending by the equivalent of £1765 per person after independence to make the deficit sustainable. Short-term forecasts of public spending are inherently uncertain, but can still provide useful predictions. A report published by the Sustainable Growth Commission set up by the SNP to make recommendations on the economy of an independent Scotland stated that the deficit would need to be cut to 3 per cent of GDP.

==== Currency ====
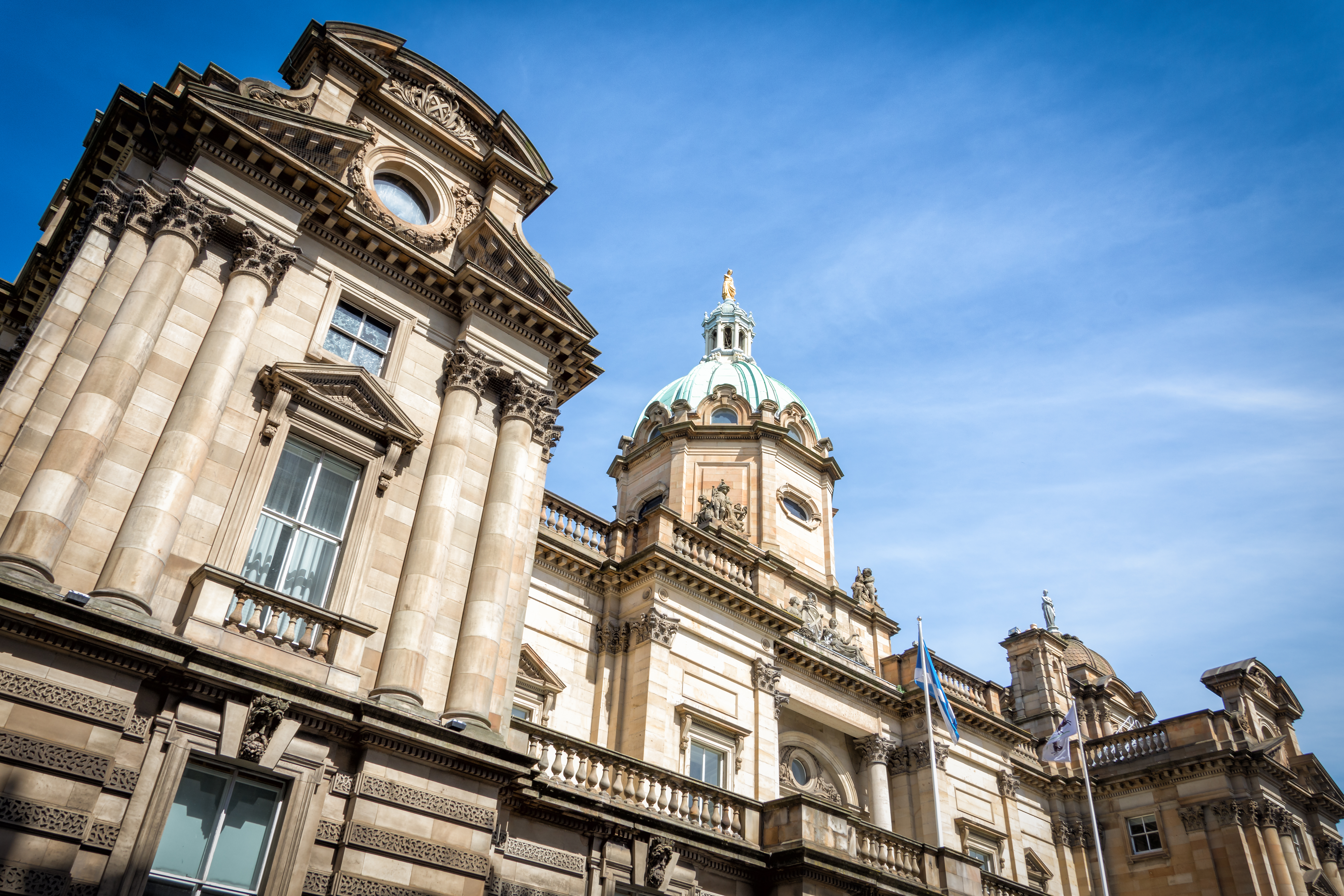
The Bank of Scotland, one of the world's oldest banks

Before the 2014 referendum, there were questions over the currency of an independent Scotland and whether it would continue to use the Pound sterling, adopt the Euro, or introduce a Scottish currency (often referred to as the "Scottish pound"). Uncertainty could be brought in the immediate aftermath of independence, particularly disagreement as to how Scotland would be treated in relation to the European Union, and the unlikelihood of the Bank of England accepting a currency union with an independent Scotland. The chairman of HSBC, Douglas Flint, warned in August 2014 of uncertainty if there was an independent Scottish currency, or if Scotland joined the Eurozone, which could result in capital flight. In 2018, the SNP suggested keeping the pound for a period after Scottish independence. Dame DeAnne Julius, a founding member of the Bank of England Monetary Policy Committee, has called this a "hugely risky experiment for Scotland".

Nicola Sturgeon announced in October 2022 her intention for Scotland to continue using the pound sterling after independence. Monetary policy in this period would be set by the Bank of England. Scotland would subsequently develop a central Scottish bank and would move to a Scottish pound "when the economic conditions were right". The establishment of a Scottish pound would be at the decision of the Scottish Parliament, once the Scottish Central Bank has established credibility, foreign exchange reserves are sufficient and Scotland is fiscally sustainable. The Scottish pound could run on a fixed or floating exchange rate.

=== Defence ===
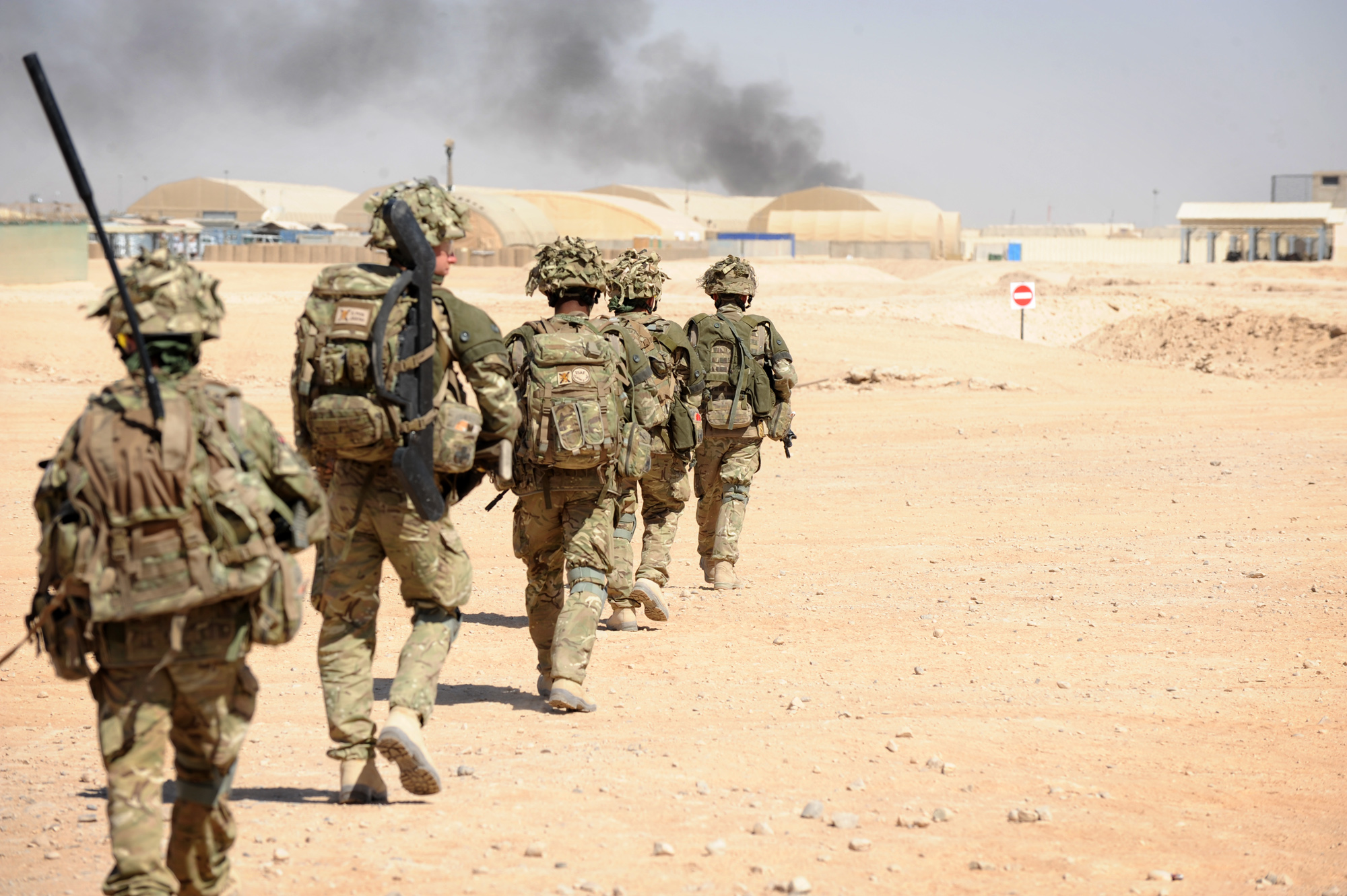
Soldiers of the Royal Regiment of Scotland, the senior and only current Scottish line infantry regiment of the British Army Infantry

With control over defence and foreign policy, an independent Scotland could demand the removal of Trident nuclear weapons, which are based in the Firth of Clyde. Nuclear disarmament is an issue long associated with the campaign for an independent Scotland, as outlined in the House of Commons Defence Committee's white paper "The future of the UK's strategic nuclear deterrent: the White Paper" of 2006–2007. The Scottish Campaign for Nuclear Disarmament supports independence on this basis.

Scottish voters are in favour of the Trident nuclear deterrent being in Scotland. Even in the event of a vote for independence, 45 per cent of Scots polled in 2022 think the nuclear deterrent should be maintained in Scotland, compared to 34 percent against. While in the Union, 58% of Scots believe in the retention of the nuclear deterrent and only 20% definitely want it axed. In the event that Scottish independence meant the nuclear deterrent could no longer be in Scotland, there is a risk that the costs of relocation would make keeping a nuclear deterrent in the British Isles unfeasible. In 2019, the NATO Secretary General said the maintenance of a British nuclear deterrent is important to NATO. In 2022, 73% of Scots wanted an independent Scotland to be part of NATO and only 8% did not.

Scotland is said to benefit from a collective defence force and an independent Scotland would weaken the UK's defence posture. There are many UK defence installations in Scotland other than Trident and many Scottish people serve in the British Armed Forces. There are 12,000 service personnel in Scotland and a further 18,500 civilian jobs in the armed forces defence industry. It is expected Scotland would lose defence jobs. For example, Lord West said Scotland could lose 20,000 or 25,000 jobs.

In 2014, a UK Government report stated that Scotland "plays an integral part in all aspects of the UK's defence". The report said the new Scottish Government would need to set up much defence infrastructure and services from scratch, and that existing defence assets in Scotland are well integrated into a UK-wide defence structure. According to the UK Government, it would be difficult for an independent Scotland to co-opt existing UK armed force units based or recruited in Scotland.

=== Foreign affairs ===
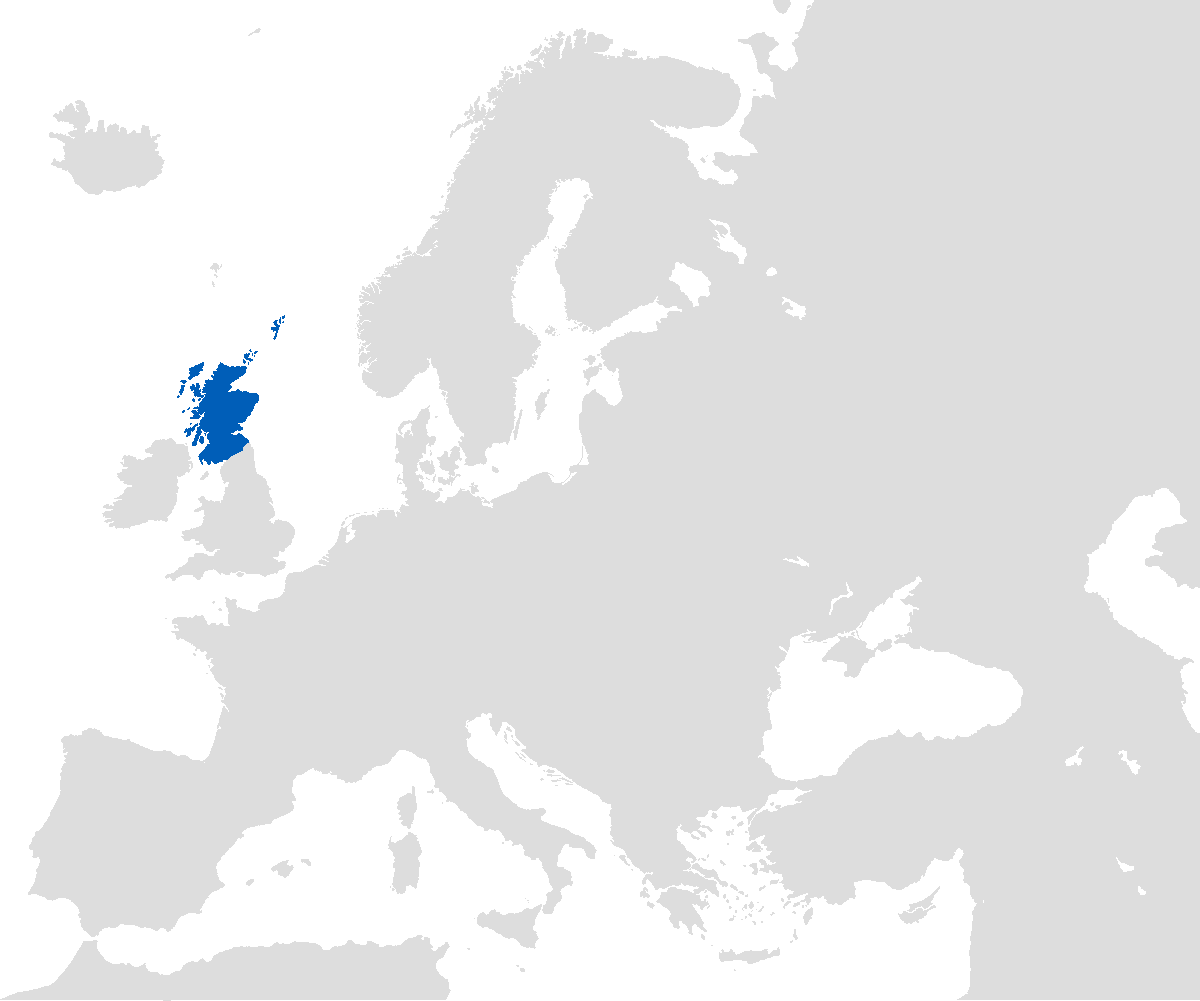
Scotland in Europe

Under the Scottish Government's 2014 plans for independence, Scotland would have applied to become a full and equal member of the United Nations, NATO and the European Union and many other international organisations. With an autonomous voice in international politics, Scottish independence campaigners believe the nation's global influence would increase in regard to the defence of its national interests and the promotion of its values. Furthermore, Scottish embassies could be established globally to promote Scotland internationally, and to lobby other governments on the nation's behalf.

During the 2014 referendum, a major argument against independence was that Scotland would be outside the EU. Scotland is very supportive of EU membership, with 62% voting to remain in the 2016 EU referendum. Since Brexit, many have called for a second independence referendum to have a chance to re-enter the EU.

As part of the UK, Scotland is part of NATO, the G7, and as a permanent member of the UN Security Council. In a 2022 poll, 82% of Scots believed that UK membership of these organisations is important. Opponents of further integration of the European Union have stated that independence, within Europe but outside the EU three, would mean that Scotland would be more marginalised because, as a relatively small independent country, Scotland would be unable to resist the demands of larger member states.

There have also been a number of commentators who argue that Scotland should work towards closer alignment with Nordic states. Current Nordic Council President and Finnish MP Ville Väyrynen openly commented on the issue when interviewed by Anthony Heron, as did former President and Chair of Denmark’s Foreign Affairs Committee Bertel Haarder.

=== Links with the rest of the UK ===
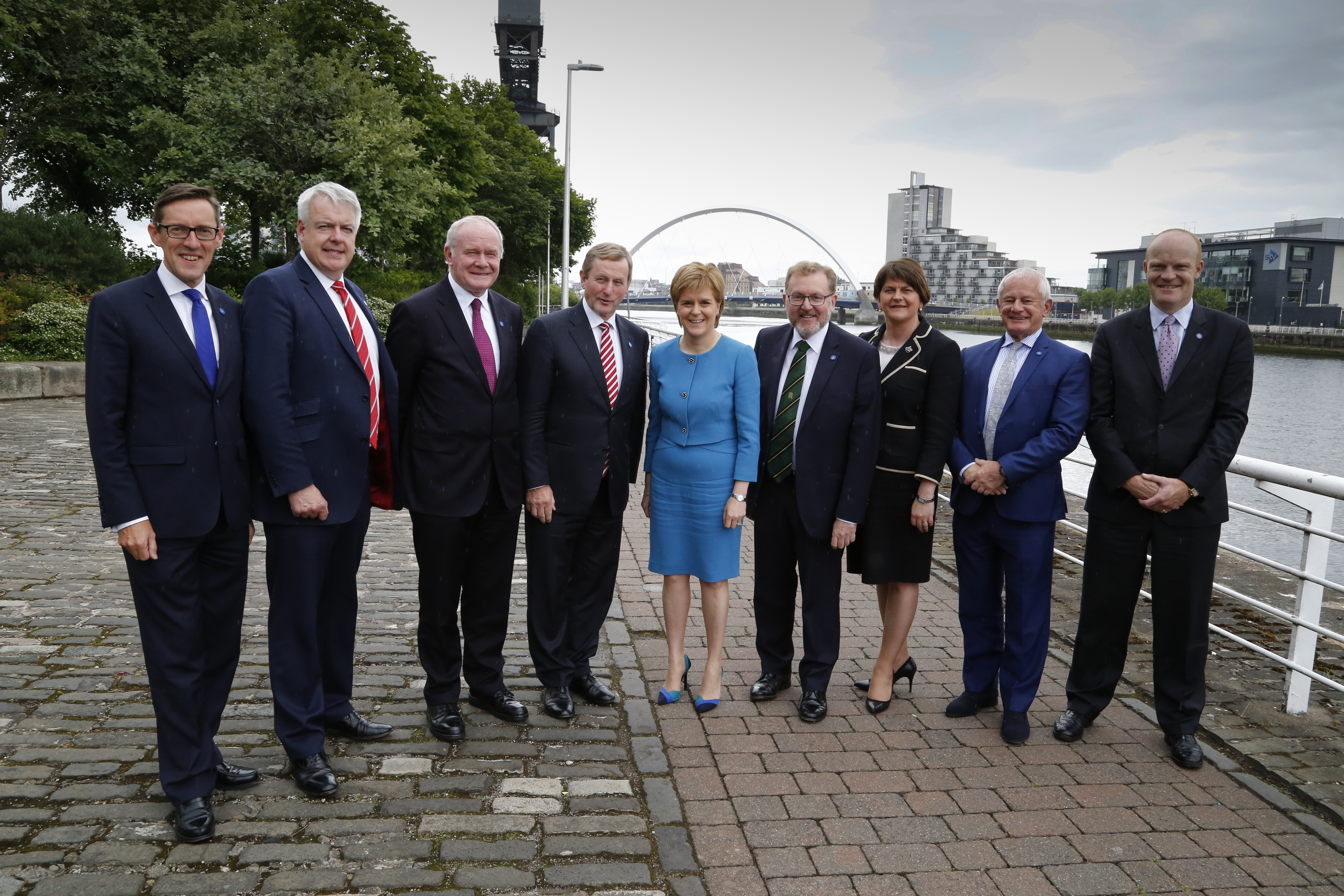
Scotland has been a member of the British-Irish Council since 1999, an intergovernmental organisation that aims to improve collaboration between its members

There are strong historical and contemporary ties between Scotland and the rest of the UK from the Reformation and Union of Crowns, to Scottish involvement in the growth and development of the British Empire and contribution of the Scottish Enlightenment and Industrial Revolution. Contemporary popular culture is also shared, primarily through the prevalence of the English language. Almost half of the Scottish population have relatives in England. At the time of the 2011 census, approximately 700,000 adults who were born in Scotland lived in the rest of the UK, while about 470,000 adults who were born elsewhere in the UK had moved to live in Scotland. There are also significant economic links with the Scottish military-industrial complex, and as argued by David Cameron, close links within the financial sector.

In Scotland's Future, the Scottish Government wrote that an independent Scotland would "not affect the many other ties that bind Scotland to the other nations of the UK" and that there will still be a social union of family, history, culture and language within the British Isles. The UK Government wrote that a relationship of two sovereign states based on self-interest is 'profoundly differently' from being part of one state, and thus any co-operation would need to be in the interest of the rest of the UK, as well as Scotland. In the Building a New Scotland series of papers, published to support the argument for independence in a proposed second independence referendum, the Scottish Government advocates that "independence would mark a new phase in the evolution of Scotland’s relationships with the UK and Ireland. While the ‘social union’ of shared histories, sport, culture, languages, and family ties would continue as before, a renewed Scottish democracy would be a force for good across these islands". The Scottish Government advocates that an independent Scotland "will have close, mutually beneficial relationships across these islands on defence and security matters".

The Scottish Government proposes that a reformed British-Irish Council would "provide a formal forum for managing some of these relationships, complementing regular bilateral discussions".

Another constitutional reform option, a confederation, where the countries of the United Kingdom; England, Scotland, Wales, as well as Northern Ireland, become separate sovereign groups or states that pool certain key resources within a confederal system, has been proposed as an alternative, particularly in the context of Welsh independence.

Beginning close to the time of the 2014 referendum, it became a topic of discussion across British news outlets that Doncaster in South Yorkshire, England has a claim to belonging to Scotland, by technicality. This originates from the 1136 and 1139 Treaties of Durham, in which David I of Scotland and his son Henry were granted the Lordship of Doncaster by Stephen of England to dissuade David from invading England. Historians observed that no known agreement in writing ever returned to Doncaster to England, unlike other territory offered from the north by Stephen, which is more commonly documented as being returned as a condition of the 1157 Treaty of Chester.

=== Comparison to Brexit ===
The Centre for Constitutional Change stated during the 2016 EU referendum campaign that the "international relations aspect of the Brexit debate looks somewhat similar to the debate about Scottish independence". There is no agreed process for Scottish independence and there would be no negotiations of the terms of independence before a positive referendum result. Ruth Davidson has described "independence because of Brexit" as "amputating your foot because you've stubbed your toe". The common use of the term Brexit has led some sources to describe Scottish independence as Scexit, a portmanteau of Scotland + exit.

== Supporters and opponents ==
=== Pro-independence ===
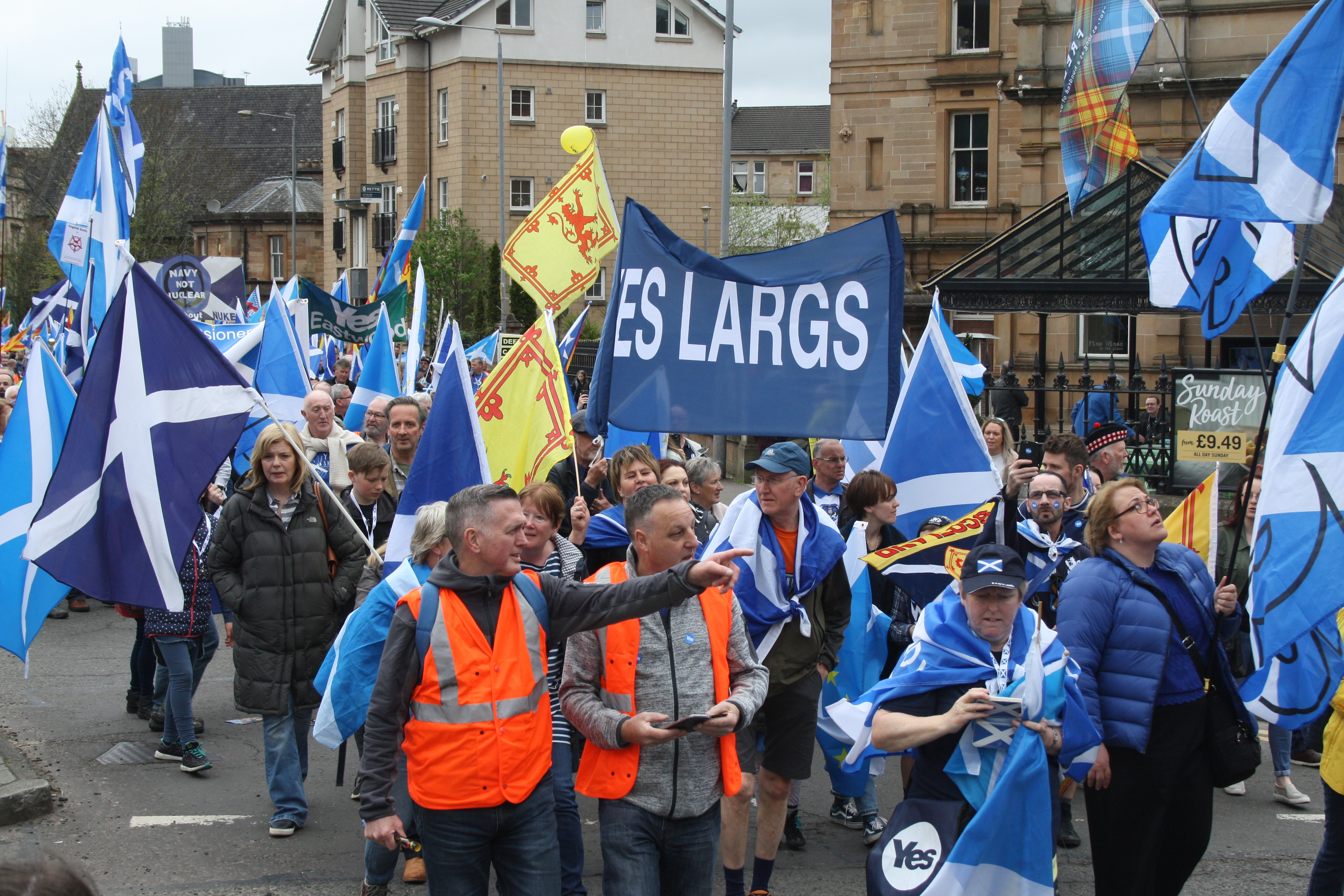
Pro-independence rally in Glasgow, 2018

Scottish independence is supported most prominently by the Scottish National Party, but other parties also support independence. Other pro-independence parties which have held representation in the Scottish Parliament or the UK Parliament include the Scottish Greens, the Alba Party and the Scottish Socialist Party. Other parties which support Scottish independence include the Independence for Scotland Party, the Scottish Libertarian Party, and Sovereignty. At the 2021 Scottish Parliament election, 72 of the 129 seats available were won by pro-independence parties (64 SNP and 8 Greens). The independence movement consists of many factions with varying political views. The SNP wants Scotland to keep the monarchy (see personal union) and become an independent Commonwealth realm, similar to Canada, Australia or New Zealand. All of the other aforementioned pro-independence parties want Scotland to become an independent republic. The SSP has led republican protests and authored the Declaration of Calton Hill, calling for an independent republic.

The Independence Convention was set up in 2005, seeking "Firstly, to create a forum for those of all political persuasions and none who support independence; and secondly, to be a national catalyst for Scottish independence." The Scottish Republican Socialist Movement is a Pan-Socialist independence movement that believes that Scotland should be made an independent republic. This movement has a Firebrand socialist ethos, however is not affiliated with the SSP or the Scottish Communist Party. It believes that a failure to become independent should lead to mass emigration elsewhere, or as put as a slogan "Independence or Desertion".

Apart from the official Yes Scotland campaign for independence in the 2014 referendum, other groups in support of independence were formed at that time. This included the National Collective, an artist-driven movement which describes itself as "an open and non-party political collaboration of talent focused on driving social and political change in Scotland through a variety of the arts". It was responsible for organising a mock referendum held at the University of Glasgow in February 2013. Another group, the Radical Independence Campaign, described itself as "fighting for an independent Scotland that is for the millions not the millionaires". RIC was formed after the Radical Independence Conference 2012 in Glasgow, which was attended by at least 650 people and has been described as a "[bringing together of] the Scottish Greens, the Scottish Socialists, some of the more militant trade unionists, nuclear-disarmament campaigners and anti-monarchist republicans".

During the 2014 referendum campaign, independence attracted little support from newspapers. The Sunday Herald was the only publication to endorse a "Yes" vote in the referendum. The National, a daily newspaper supporting independence, was launched in November 2014, in wake of the Yes Scotland campaign's defeat.

In October 2014, the lobby group All Under One Banner (AUOB) was formed. AUOB stages regular public marches in support of Scottish independence throughout Scotland.

Proponents of Brexit and Scotland's independence share relatively similar, but incompatible, objectives and difficulties. Despite this, those who voted for Brexit in 2016 tend to be more unionist than those who voted to remain. The BBC reported that 39% of those who voted Leave in 2016 would vote Yes, while 59% of those who voted Remain would do the same.

On 14 October 2025, Zack Polanski, the leader of the Green Party of England and Wales announced his support for both Scottish and Welsh independence with the Scottish Greens publishing a statement shortly after that "Every vote for Greens is vote for independence."

=== Unionism ===
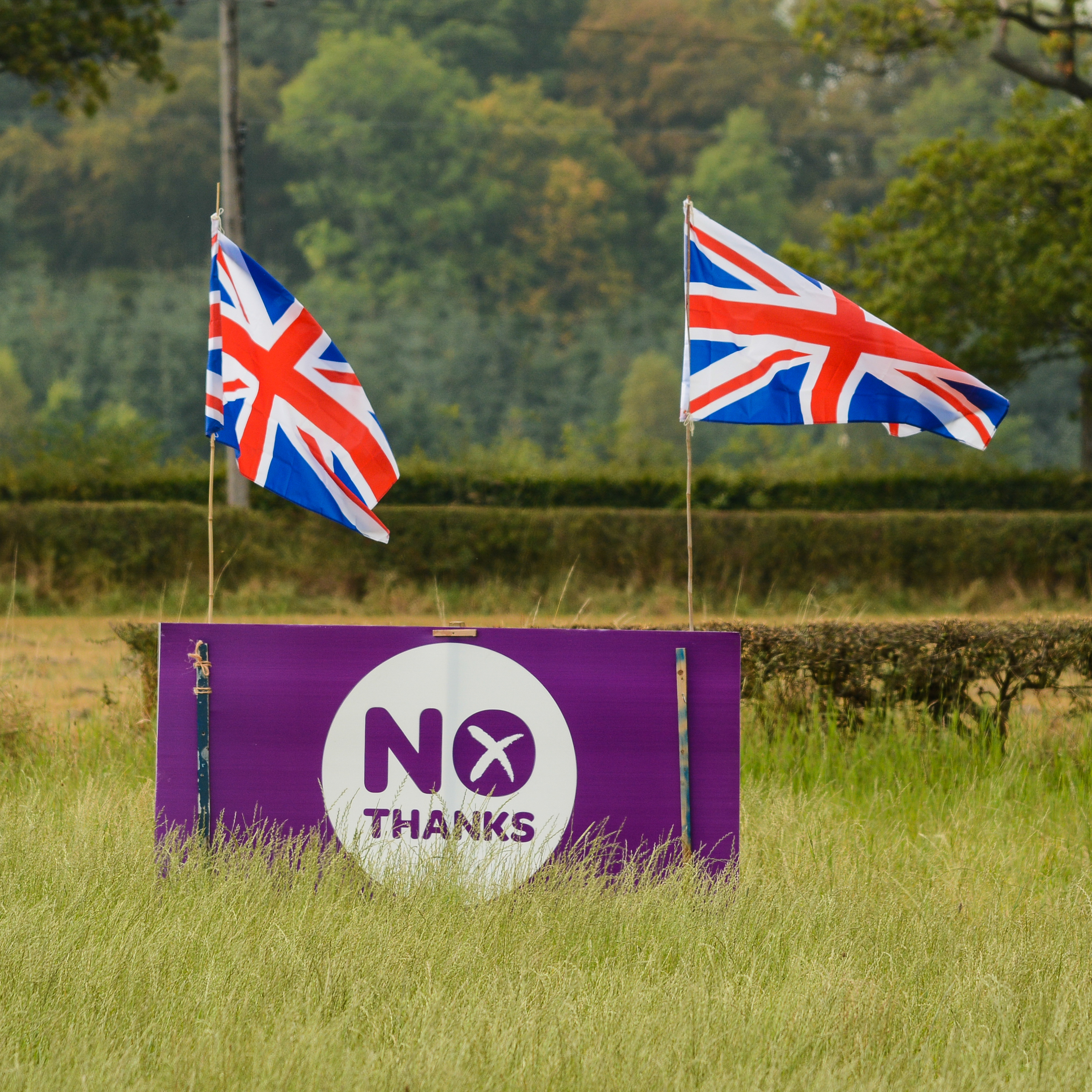
A "No thanks" sign from the 2014 anti-independence referendum campaign

The Conservative Party, Labour Party and Liberal Democrats, which all have seats in the Scottish Parliament, are in favour of unionism. In 2012 they established the cross-party Better Together campaign. Other parties that oppose Scottish independence include the UK Independence Party (UKIP), All for Unity, Reform UK, Abolish the Scottish Parliament, the British National Party (BNP), Britain First, (Note: De-registered by the Electoral Commission in February 2017) the Scottish Unionist Party (SUP), and the Ulster unionist parties.

Scotland in Union is a campaign group established in 2015 following the independence referendum. It has encouraged tactical voting in elections and a positive outlook on unionism. In late 2017, a new campaign group called UK Unity separated from Scotland in Union. The new organisation supported Brexit and was critical of Scotland in Union's "agnostic" stance on the issue.

Many leaders of foreign nations expressed support for Unionism during the 2014 independence referendum. Barack Obama expressed his support for a "strong, robust and united" UK, and the Swedish foreign minister and former prime minister Carl Bildt opposed what he called the "Balkanisation of the British Isles".

The Orange Order, a Protestant brotherhood with thousands of members in Scotland, campaigned against Scottish independence, and formed a campaign group called British Together. In September 2014, it held a march of at least 15,000 Orangemen, loyalist bands and supporters from Scotland and across the UK; described as the biggest pro-Union demonstration of the campaign.

== Foreign interference in the independence debate ==
=== Russia ===
On 21 July 2020, the Intelligence and Security Committee of Parliament published a report documenting Russian interference in British politics, which referred to "credible open source commentary" regarding Russian influence operations in relation to the 2014 referendum. During the 2014 referendum, Russian election observers cast doubt on the result by claiming that ballots had been improperly handled and that the referendum count took place in rooms that were too big. Russia Today alleged that the referendum had been rigged and expressed disbelief at "North Korean" levels of turnout. The Russian-backed Donetsk People's Republic, a separatist enclave in eastern Ukraine, also issued a statement claiming that the results had been falsified. Russian online activists further attempted to cast doubt on the result by spreading fake videos and amplifying allegations that ballots were interfered with.

=== Iran ===
The Islamic Republic of Iran has also offered support to Scottish independence through both overt and covert means. Press TV, the Iranian regime's English-language propaganda outlet, has presented the Scottish independence campaign as an anti-colonial struggle, and has presented false stories claiming that the British Government has militarised Scottish territory to suppress support for independence. In September 2024, Clemson University researchers discovered at least 80 Iranian accounts pretending to be British and expressing left-wing views. The network was likely operated by the Iranian Revolutionary Guard Corps (IRGC) and had at least a quarter of a million followers according to the researchers.

In 2025, The Times reported that the IRGC had a network of fake accounts on X which were used to cause tension and disunity within the United Kingdom and the United States. It was found that Iranian linked accounts demonstrated support for Scottish independence and for the Scottish National Party. In August 2025, the anti-disinformation firm Cyabra presented evidence that up to 26% of profiles on X discussing Scottish independence were fake and linked to an Iranian state-backed disinformation campaign: Cyabra analysed conversations on X between May and June 2025, and found that over 1,300 of the more than 5,000 pro-independence users it examined were fake. These fictitious profiles posted more than 3,000 posts in a period of six weeks, generating over 224 million potential views and more than 126,000 user engagements. The campaign was exposed after dozens of accounts ceased to post during the Twelve-Day War between Iran and Israel between 13 and 24 June 2025, when Israel extensively targeted Iranian military, electrical, and communications infrastructure. When they returned to posting, their narratives had shifted to emphasising Iranian resilience against Israeli attacks. One of these profiles presented itself as a Glasgow-based socialist, while another purported to be a former NHS nurse, with aliases including Fiona, Jake, Lucy, Kelly, Alisa and Ewan. Their posts pushed pro-Scottish independence and anti-Brexit narratives, as well as accusing institutions like the BBC and Scottish Labour of bias and betrayal.

In November 2025, X began displaying transparency data such as location, history, and username changes on user accounts. This further confirmed suspicions of a major Iranian influence campaign in support of Scottish independence: transparency data for a cluster of accounts confirmed that they connected via the Iranian Cafe Bazaar app store and simultaneously routed through VPN servers in the Netherlands. The posting rhythms for these accounts followed each other closely, including fabricated AI-generated photos and videos and amplifying each others' posts in a short period of time. Scottish Labour MP Graeme Downie said, "This confirms what we already knew that Iran, as well as countries such as Russia and our other enemies, are actively seeking to subvert our democracy and discourse in Scotland and the UK. We are already in a grey war with our enemies and this is further proof of that." The IRGC suspended its promotion of Scottish independence in February 2026, coinciding with the United States and Israel's war with Iran.

== Public opinion ==
=== Polling ahead of the 2014 referendum ===
Many opinion polls were conducted about Scottish independence during the 2014 referendum campaign. (Note: Attributed to multiple sources:) Professor John Curtice stated in January 2012 that polling had shown support for independence at between 32% and 38% of the Scottish population. This had fallen somewhat since the SNP were first elected to become the Scottish Government in 2007. The research also showed, however, that the proportion of the population strongly opposed to independence had also declined. Curtice stated in April 2014 that support for independence had increased since December 2013, although there was disagreement between the polling companies as to the true state of public opinion. Polls in the run-up to the referendum vote showed a closing of the gap, with one YouGov poll giving the Yes campaign a 51–49 lead. In the referendum Scotland voted against independence by 55.3% to 44.7%, with an overall turnout of 84.5%.

=== Polling since the 2014 referendum ===
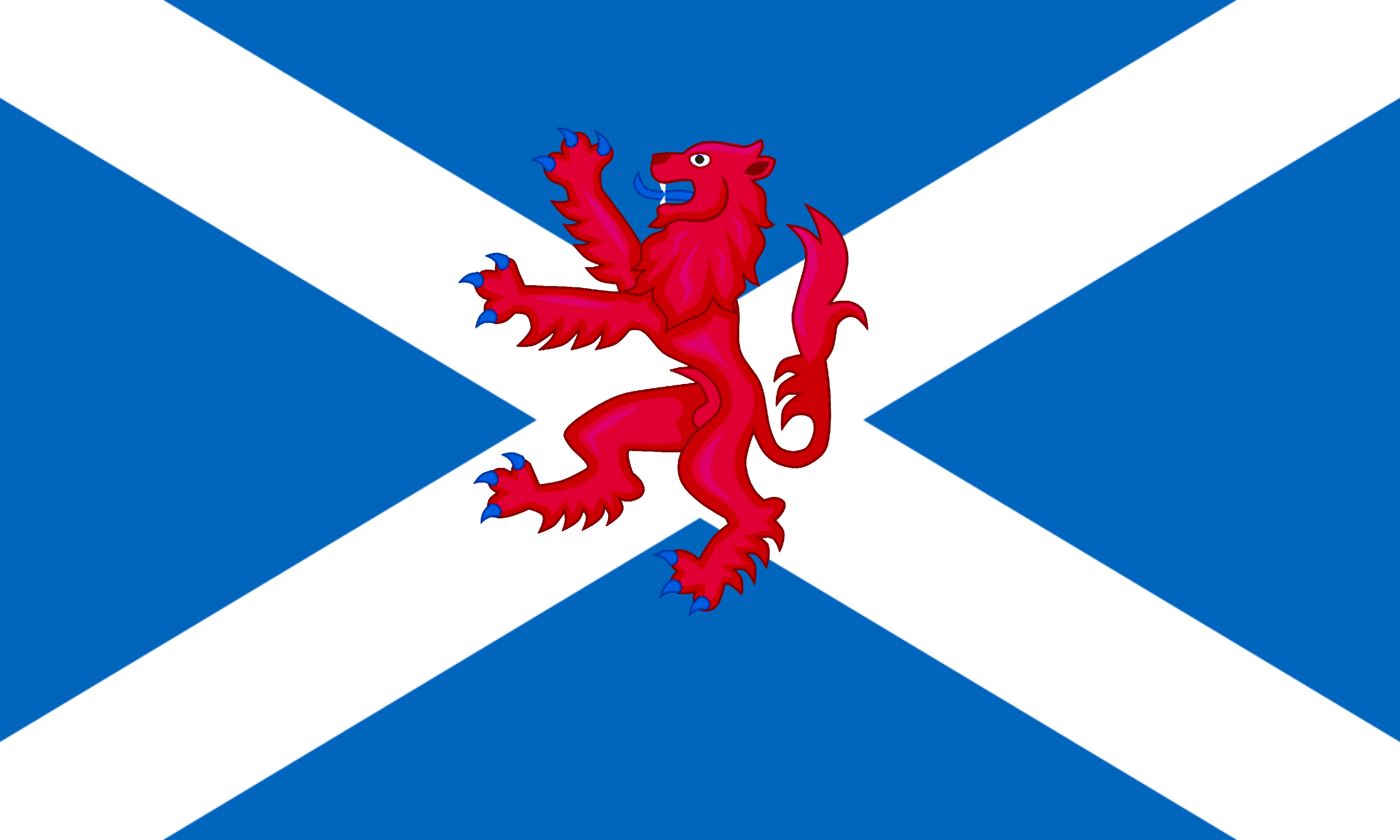
Banner adopted by the Scottish Labour Hub to represent a new direction for the Labour Party in Scotland.

Since six weeks after the 2014 referendum, opinion polls have asked how people would vote in a proposed second referendum. Twenty-five polls were conducted in the year after the referendum, with seventeen of them having "No" as the predominant answer, seven having "Yes", and one having an equal proportion of respondents for each opinion.

In the year from September 2016 to September 2017, 25 of 26 polls conducted showed "No" as the most popular answer and only one showed "Yes" as the most popular answer. "No" continued to show a lead in opinion polls until July 2019, when one poll by Michael Ashcroft showed a narrow majority for "Yes". Professor John Curtice said after this poll was released that there had recently been a swing towards "Yes", and that this was concentrated among people who had voted to "Remain" in the 2016 Brexit referendum.

This pro-independence trend continued into 2020, as three polls in the early part of the year put "Yes" support at between 50% and 52%. In October 2020, an Ipsos MORI/STV News poll saw support for independence at its highest ever level, with 58% saying they would vote "Yes". As of December 2020, fifteen consecutive opinion polls had shown a lead for "Yes". The run of polls showing a "Yes" lead continued into January 2021, although the average support for Yes was down by two percentage points compared to polls by the same companies in late 2020. Polls conducted in early March 2021, following testimony by Alex Salmond and Nicola Sturgeon at a Holyrood parliamentary inquiry, showed narrow leads for "No".

Support for independence in opinion polling depends upon the format of the question being asked. Polling company Survation have asked Scottish voters the question "Should Scotland remain in the United Kingdom or leave the United Kingdom?". Since 2018, none of these polls have shown a lead for Remain of less than 10%. The rest of the UK generally supports Scotland remaining a part of the UK. YouGov polling between late 2019 and early 2022 shows that support for Scottish independence is at around 30%, while support for Scotland remaining in the UK is at around 45%.

Following the Supreme Court Judgement of 23 November 2022, determining that the Scottish Government did not have the power to conduct a consultative independence referendum, the first five polls showed majority support for independence in the range of 51% - 56%. In a separate UK-wide poll, for the first time majority support (55%) was expressed across the UK for the right of the Scottish Government to hold an independence referendum.

== See also ==
Other major independence or related movements

- Yes Scotland
- All Under One Banner
- Welsh independence
- YesCymru
- Proposed Welsh independence referendum
- United Ireland
- Ireland's Future
- English independence
- List of active separatist movements in Europe
- Catalan independence movement

Related topics

- Scottish devolution
- Scottish nationalism
- Scottish republicanism
- Separatism in the United Kingdom

Organisations

- Scottish Liberals for Independence
- Scottish Socialist Youth
