= 1997 Scottish devolution referendum =

Measure creating a devolved Scottish Parliament

- 11 September 1997
- Do you agree that there should be a Scottish Parliament as proposed by the Government?

Results
Choice	Votes	%
Yes	1,775,045	74.29%
No	614,400	25.71%
Valid votes	2,389,445	99.92%
Invalid or blank votes	11,986	0.50%
Total votes	2,391,268	100.00%
Registered voters/turnout	3,973,673	60.18%
- Results by local voting area Yes: 50–60% 60–70% 70–80% 80–90%

Scottish devolution referendum, 1997
- 11 September 1997
- Do you agree that a Scottish Parliament should have tax-raising powers as proposed by the Government?

Results
Choice	Votes	%
Yes	1,512,889	63.48%
No	870,263	36.52%
Valid votes	2,383,152	99.66%
Invalid or blank votes	19,013	0.80%
Total votes	2,391,268	100.00%
Registered voters/turnout	3,973,673	60.18%
- Results by local voting area Yes: 50–60% 60–70% 70–80% No: 50–60%
- Saturation of colour reflects the strength of the Yes vote in each Council area.

The Scottish devolution referendum of 1997 was a pre-legislative referendum held in Scotland on 11 September 1997 over whether there was support for the creation of a Scottish Parliament with devolved powers, and whether the Parliament should have tax-varying powers. The result was "Yes–Yes": a majority voted in favour of both proposals, and the Parliament was established following an election in 1999. Turnout for the referendum was 60.4%.

The referendum was a Labour Party manifesto commitment and was held in their first term in office after the 1997 general election, under the provisions of the Referendums (Scotland and Wales) Act 1997. It was the second referendum held in Scotland over the question of devolution, the first being in 1979, and is to date the only major referendum to be held in any part of the United Kingdom where voters were asked two questions in the same plebiscite.

== Background ==
Logo used by the Yes Campaign

A referendum was held in 1979 under a Labour government which stipulated that a Scottish Assembly would come into being if the referendum had been supported by 50% of votes cast plus a controversial rule whereby at least 40% of the electorate had to vote in favour. Although 51.6% voted in favour, this was only 32.9% of the electorate so the Assembly was not brought into being. Shortly afterwards, the predominantly anti-devolution-led Conservative Party won the 1979 general election.

Logo used by the No Campaign

That government put devolution to one side but it was a policy area that remained on the agenda of the Labour Party. A Campaign for a Scottish Assembly was formed afterwards to continue the campaign. They brought together a committee of "prominent Scots" who drafted the document "A Claim of Right for Scotland". The "Claim" was published in 1988 and signed by most Scottish politicians, local councils, trade unions and churches. It was agreed to form a Scottish Constitutional Convention, made up of existing MPs and councillors.

The Labour Party included the establishment of a Scottish Parliament in its manifesto for the 1997 general election, which they won with a landslide majority of 179.

== Referendum questions ==
The electorate was asked to vote on two sets of statements which corresponded to both proposals.

On the first ballot paper the following appeared:

Parliament has decided to consult people in Scotland on the Government's proposals for a Scottish Parliament:

I agree there should be a Scottish Parliament

or

I do not agree there should be a Scottish Parliament

(To be marked by a single (X))

On the second ballot paper the following appeared:

Parliament has decided to consult people in Scotland on the Government's proposals for a Scottish Parliament to have tax varying powers:

I agree that a Scottish Parliament should have tax-varying powers

or

I do not agree that a Scottish Parliament should have tax-varying powers

(To be marked by a single (X))

== Campaign ==
Scottish Labour, the SNP, Scottish Liberal Democrats, and Scottish Greens campaigned for a "Yes" vote for both proposals whilst the Scottish Conservatives opposed both proposals. Labour MP Tam Dalyell opposed the creation of the Parliament, but accepted that it should have tax-varying powers if it were to be established.

The official Yes campaign, Scotland Forward (styled "Scotland FORward"), was headed by the businessman Nigel Smith and came out of the groups that had previously formed the Scottish Constitutional Convention, along with the Scottish National Party. It was supported by the Labour, SNP, Liberal Democrat and Green parties.

The official No campaign, Think Twice, was headed by Brian Monteith, a former employee of the Conservative MP Michael Forsyth. Board members included Donald Findlay, rector of the University of St Andrews and vice-chairman of Rangers F.C., and senior Conservative peer Lord Fraser. However, it struggled to get much business support as they were wary of opposing a project that had such support from the new government which had a large majority.

Campaigning in the referendum was suspended between the death and funeral of Diana, Princess of Wales. It was speculated that the Scottish referendum could have been postponed, but this would have required a recall of the UK Parliament and an amendment to the Referendums Act.

== Opinion polling ==
Polling on the establishment of a Scottish Parliament
Date(s) conducted	Pollster	Client	Sample size	Yes	No	Don't know	Lead
11 Sep 1997	1997 devolution referendum		–	74.3%	25.7%	N/A	48.6%
10 Sep 1997	ICM	The Scotsman	–	63%	25%	12%	38%
8 Sep 1997	MORI	STV	–	67%	22%	11%	45%
7 Sep 1997	NOP	The Sunday Times	–	63%	21%	16%	42%
7 Sep 1997	ICM	The Scotsman	1,010	60%	25%	15%	35%
6–7 Sep 1997	System Three	The Herald	1,039	61%	20%	19%	41%
21–26 Aug 1997	System Three	The Herald	1,039	61%	23%	16%	38%
24–29 Jul 1997	System Three	The Herald	1,024	65%	19%	16%	46%
26 Jun – 1 Jul 1997	System Three	The Herald	978	68%	21%	10%	47%
22–27 May 1997	System Three	The Herald	1,024	64%	21%	15%	43%

Polling on the establishment of a Scottish Parliament with tax-varying power
Date(s) conducted	Pollster	Client	Sample size	Yes	No	Don't know	Lead
11 Sep 1997	1997 devolution referendum		–	63.5%	36.5%	N/A	27.0%
10 Sep 1997	ICM	The Scotsman	–	48%	40%	12%	8%
8 Sep 1997	MORI	STV	–	45%	31%	24%	14%
7 Sep 1997	NOP	The Sunday Times	–	51%	34%	15%	17%
7 Sep 1997	ICM	The Scotsman	1,010	45%	38%	17%	7%
6–7 Sep 1997	System Three	The Herald	1,039	45%	31%	24%	14%
21–26 Aug 1997	System Three	The Herald	1,039	47%	32%	21%	15%
24–29 Jul 1997	System Three	The Herald	1,024	54%	27%	18%	27%
26 Jun – 1 Jul 1997	System Three	The Herald	978	56%	26%	18%	30%
22–27 May 1997	System Three	The Herald	1,024	53%	28%	19%	25%

== Results ==
The result was "Yes-Yes": the majority voted "I agree" in favour of both proposals. Two council areas had an overall "Yes-No" result – Dumfries and Galloway and Orkney. More votes were cast for the first question than the second in all regions (except Fife), with substantially more spoilt ballots for the second question, perhaps due to voter confusion over the two papers.

=== Question 1 ===
Map showing results by council: Yes: 50–60% Yes 60–70% Yes 70-80% Yes 80-90% Yes

1997 Scottish devolution referendum (Question 1)
Choice	Votes	%
I agree there should be a Scottish Parliament	1,775,045	74.29
I do not agree that there should be a Scottish Parliament	614,200	25.71
Total	2,389,245	100.00
Valid votes	2,389,445	99.50
Invalid/blank votes	11,986	0.50
Total votes	2,401,431	100.00
Registered voters/turnout	3,973,673	60.43

Question 1 results (excluding invalid votes)
Agree; 1,775,045 (74.3%)	Disagree; 614,400 (25.7%)
▲50%

==== By council area ====
Council area	Votes		Proportion of votes	
Council area	Agree	Disagree	Agree	Disagree
Aberdeen City	65,035	25,580	71.8%	28.2%
Aberdeenshire	61,621	34,878	63.9%	36.1%
Angus	33,571	18,350	64.7%	35.3%
Argyll and Bute	30,452	14,796	67.3%	32.7%
Clackmannanshire	18,790	4,706	80.0%	20.0%
Dumfries and Galloway	44,619	28,863	60.7%	39.3%
Dundee City	49,252	15,553	76.0%	24.0%
East Ayrshire	49,131	11,426	81.1%	18.9%
East Dunbartonshire	40,917	17,725	69.8%	30.2%
East Lothian	33,525	11,665	74.2%	25.8%
East Renfrewshire	28,253	17,573	61.7%	38.3%
City of Edinburgh	155,900	60,832	71.9%	28.1%
Falkirk	55,642	13,953	80.0%	20.0%
Fife	125,668	39,517	76.1%	23.9%
Glasgow City	204,269	40,106	83.6%	16.4%
Highland	72,551	27,431	72.6%	27.4%
Inverclyde	31,680	8,945	78.0%	22.0%
Midlothian	31,681	7,979	79.9%	20.1%
Moray	24,822	12,122	67.2%	32.8%
North Ayrshire	51,304	15,931	76.3%	23.7%
North Lanarkshire	123,063	26,010	82.6%	17.4%
Perth and Kinross	40,344	24,998	61.7%	38.3%
Renfrewshire	68,711	18,213	79.0%	21.0%
Scottish Borders	33,855	20,060	62.8%	37.2%
South Ayrshire	40,161	19,909	66.9%	33.1%
South Lanarkshire	114,908	32,762	77.8%	22.2%
Stirling	29,190	13,440	68.5%	31.5%
West Dunbartonshire	39,051	7,058	84.7%	15.3%
West Lothian	56,923	14,614	79.6%	20.4%
Na h-Eileanan Siar (Western Isles)	9,977	2,589	79.4%	20.6%
Orkney	4,749	3,541	57.3%	42.7%
Shetland	5,430	3,275	62.4%	37.6%

=== Question 2 ===
Map showing results by council: Yes: 50–60% 60–70% 70-80% No: 50–60%

Scottish devolution referendum, 1997 (Question 2)
Choice	Votes	%
I agree that a Scottish Parliament should have tax-varying powers	1,512,889	63.48
I do not agree that a Scottish Parliament should have tax-varying powers	870,263	36.52
Total	2,383,152	100.00
Valid votes	2,383,152	99.21
Invalid/blank votes	19,013	0.79
Total votes	2,402,165	100.00
Registered voters/turnout	3,973,673	60.45

Question 2 referendum results (without spoiled ballots):
Agree: 1,512,889 (63.5%)	Disagree: 870,263 (36.5%)
▲

==== By council area ====
Council area	Votes		Proportion of votes	
Council area	Agree	Disagree	Agree	Disagree
Aberdeen City	54,320	35,709	60.3%	39.7%
Aberdeenshire	50,295	45,929	52.3%	47.7%
Angus	27,641	24,089	53.4%	46.6%
Argyll and Bute	25,746	19,429	57.0%	43.0%
Clackmannanshire	16,112	7,355	68.7%	31.3%
Dumfries and Galloway	35,737	37,499	48.8%	51.2%
Dundee City	42,304	22,280	65.5%	34.5%
East Ayrshire	42,559	17,824	70.5%	29.5%
East Dunbartonshire	34,576	23,914	59.1%	40.9%
East Lothian	28,152	16,765	62.7%	37.3%
East Renfrewshire	23,580	22,153	51.6%	48.4%
City of Edinburgh	133,843	82,188	62.0%	38.0%
Falkirk	48,064	21,403	69.2%	30.8%
Fife	108,021	58,987	64.7%	35.3%
Glasgow City	182,589	60,842	75.0%	25.0%
Highland	61,359	37,525	62.1%	37.9%
Inverclyde	27,194	13,277	67.2%	32.8%
Midlothian	26,776	12,762	67.7%	32.3%
Moray	19,326	17,344	52.7%	47.3%
North Ayrshire	43,990	22,991	65.7%	34.3%
North Lanarkshire	107,288	41,372	72.2%	27.8%
Perth and Kinross	33,398	31,709	51.3%	48.7%
Renfrewshire	55,075	31,537	63.6%	36.4%
Scottish Borders	27,284	26,487	50.7%	49.3%
South Ayrshire	33,679	26,217	56.2%	43.8%
South Lanarkshire	99,587	47,708	67.6%	32.4%
Stirling	25,044	17,487	58.9%	41.1%
West Dunbartonshire	34,408	11,628	74.7%	25.3%
West Lothian	47,990	23,354	67.3%	32.7%
Na h-Eileanan Siar (Western Isles)	8,557	3,947	68.4%	31.6%
Orkney	3,917	4,344	47.4%	52.6%
Shetland	4,478	4,198	51.6%	48.4%

Votes in favour of tax-varying powers still commanded significant majority, when compared to establishing the Parliament per se. A majority voted 'I agree' in every local council, apart from in Dumfries & Galloway and Orkney.

=== Overall turnout by council area ===
Council area	Turnout
Aberdeen City	53.7%
Aberdeenshire	57.0%
Angus	60.2%
Argyll & Bute	65.0%
Clackmannanshire	66.1%
Dumfries & Galloway	63.4%
Dundee City	55.7%
East Ayrshire	64.8%
East Dunbartonshire	72.2%
East Lothian	65.0%
East Renfrewshire	68.2%
City of Edinburgh	60.1%
Falkirk	63.7%
Fife	60.7%
Glasgow City	51.6%
Highland	60.3%
Inverclyde	60.4%
Midlothian	65.1%
Moray	57.8%
North Ayrshire	63.4%
North Lanarkshire	60.8%
Perth & Kinross	63.5%
Renfrewshire	62.8%
Scottish Borders	64.8%
South Ayrshire	66.7%
South Lanarkshire	63.1%
Stirling	65.8%
West Dunbartonshire	63.7%
West Lothian	60.4%
Na h-Eileanan Siar (Western Isles)	55.8%
Orkney	53.5%
Shetland	51.5%

== Outcome ==
In response to the majority voting for "Yes" to both proposals, the UK Parliament passed the Scotland Act 1998. This established a Scottish Parliament for the first time since the adjournment of the pre-Union Parliament of Scotland in 1707. The devolved Parliament convened for the first time in May 1999, following its first election. This was a poll that the Conservative Party had to fight despite losing their "No" Campaign and having no Westminster seats in Scotland after losing the 1997 general election. The Scotland Act 1998 also created the Scottish Executive, later to become known as the Scottish Government.

== Reaction to the result ==
Professor Tom Devine, academic at the University of Edinburgh, dubbed the referendum result "the most significant development in Scottish political history since the Union of 1707". Prime Minister Tony Blair claimed that "the era of big centralised government is over".

The "Yes" campaign leaders Donald Dewar (Scottish Labour) and Alex Salmond (Scottish National Party) held different views over the devolution proposal. However, they put their political differences aside immediately after the vote in celebration. Despite this, the SNP's calls for independence soon reignited with SNP leader Alex Salmond claiming that there would be an independent Scotland within his lifetime. The "No" campaign did not share this optimism and feared that this vote was a catalyst towards the break-up of the Union.

When the Secretary of State for Scotland, Donald Dewar, went back to London to implement the referendum result, he found the Whitehall civil service unwilling to give up powers and doubting that matters over and above those previously handled by the Scottish Office (such as education, health, transport, police and housing) should be politically devolved. Detail was also lacking in that the Scottish Constitutional Convention had failed to address issues such as the role of The Queen or aspects of tax-varying powers.

== See also ==
- Referendums in the United Kingdom
- 1997 Welsh devolution referendum
- Scottish independence
- Scottish Parliament
- 1979 Scottish devolution referendum
- 2014 Scottish independence referendum
