= General Assembly Hall of the Church of Scotland =

Multi-purpose venue in Edinburgh, Scotland

Coordinates: 55°56′59″N 3°11′42″W

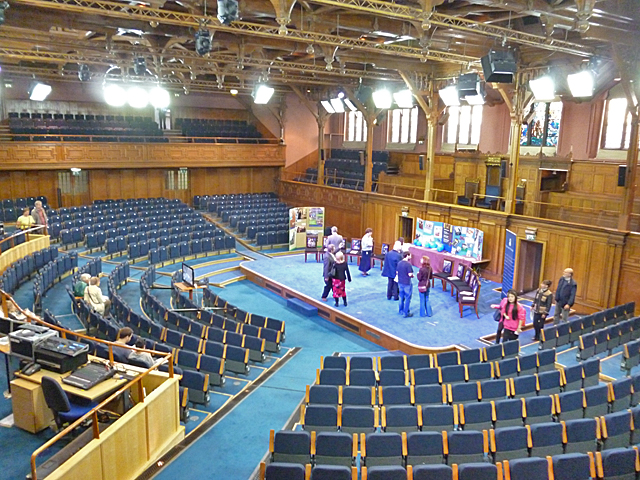
The General Assembly Hall (pictured in 2013)

The Assembly Hall is located between Castlehill and Mound Place in Edinburgh, Scotland. It is the meeting place of the General Assembly of the Church of Scotland.

== History ==
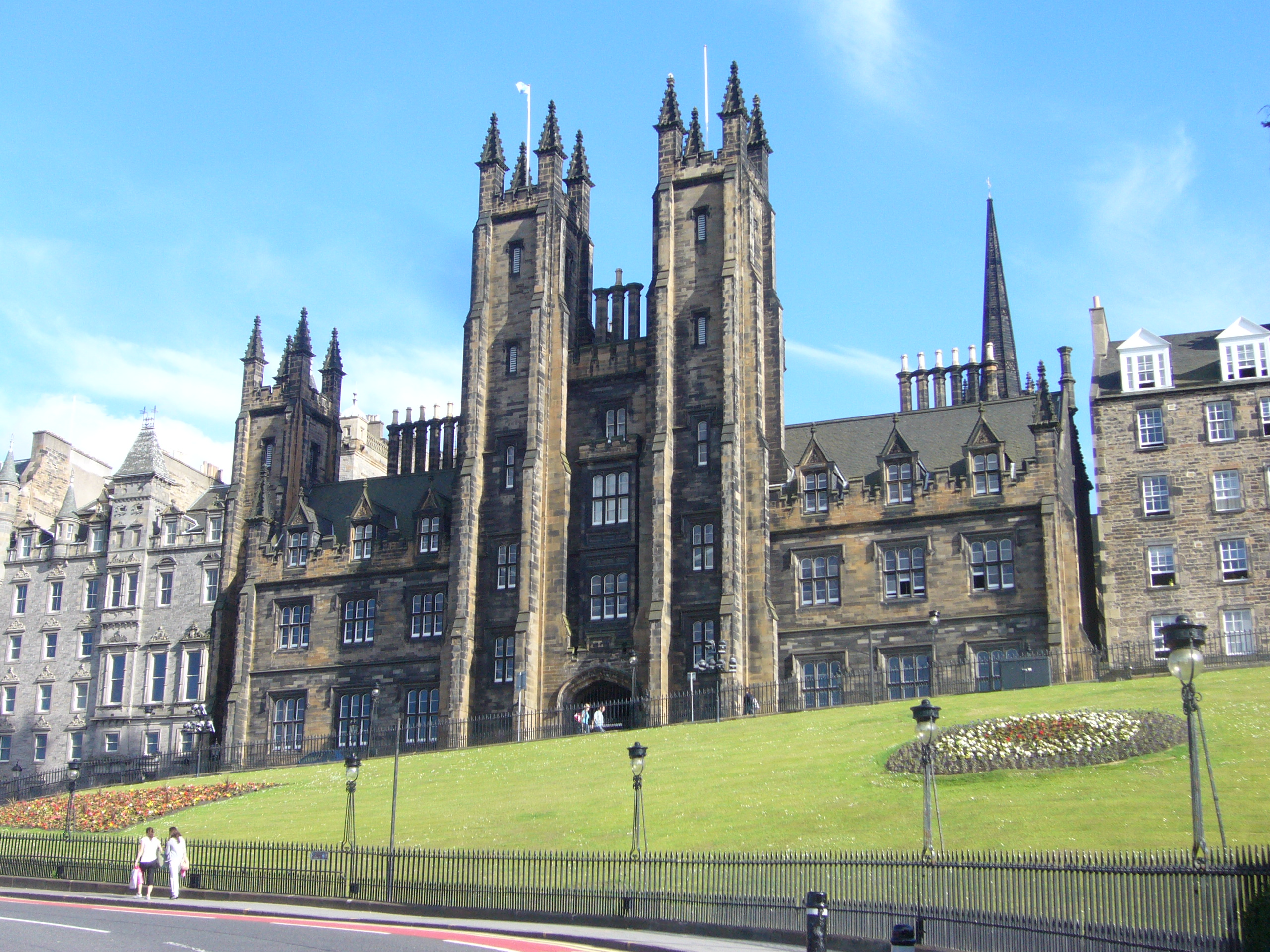
Playfair's New College

Following the Disruption in the Church of Scotland in 1843, the emergent Free Church of Scotland urgently required a new theological college (New College) in Edinburgh, an Assembly Hall and a home for the Free High Church (the members of St Giles' Cathedral who left at the Disruption). A complex of buildings was thus designed by William Henry Playfair and built between 1845 and 1850. The Assembly Hall itself was designed by David Bryce and built in 1858–1859. The back of the Hall facing Castlehill was extended east by J. M. Dick Peddie in 1885, with further work in 1901–1903.

In 1900, the United Presbyterian Church and a majority of the Free Church of Scotland united as the United Free Church of Scotland; the Assembly Hall was henceforth used by the newly united church. The United Free Church of Scotland and the Church of Scotland united in 1929. The Assembly Hall thus became the Assembly Hall of the reunited Church of Scotland. Overlooking the Moderator's chair, the centre of the south gallery was adapted to become the "Throne Gallery" for the Lord High Commissioner. Until 1929, the General Assemblies of the (old) Church of Scotland were held in St John's Highland Tolbooth Church (now 'the Hub'), the spire of which continues to overshadow the Assembly Hall and New College.

== Interior ==
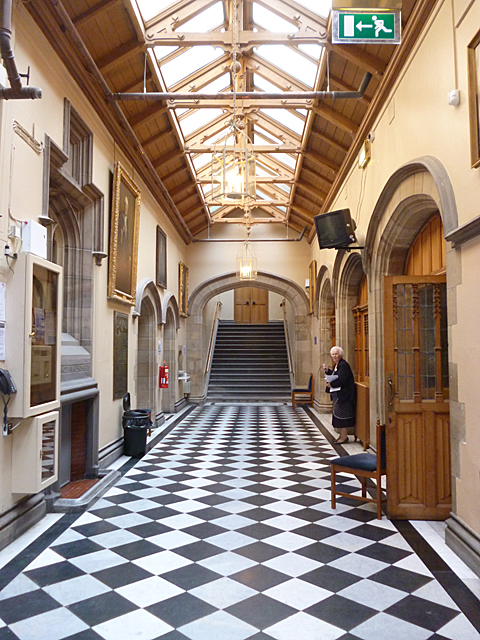
The Black and White Corridor

The Black and White Corridor occupies space on the north side and is so-named because of its distinctive chequered floor tiling. From the Black and White Corridor, steps lead down to the New College quadrangle (and Mound Place) and another staircase leads up to the Moderator's rooms and the Clerks' room (immediately above). Stairs also lead into the Rainy Hall of New College.

== Other uses ==
=== Scottish Parliament ===
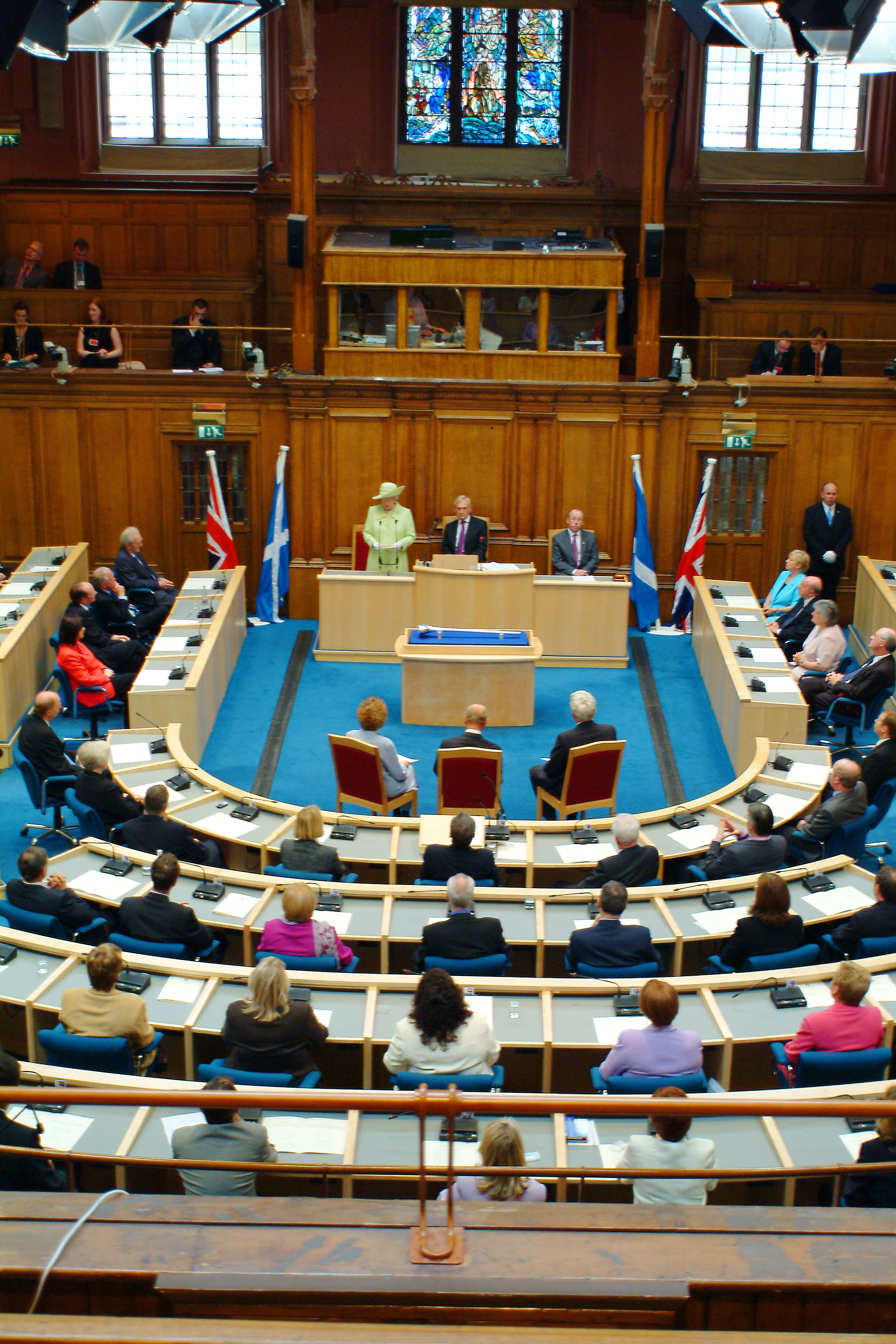
The Queen addressing the Scottish Parliament in the General Assembly Hall (3 June 2003)

The Scottish Constitutional Convention met in the Assembly Hall on 30 March 1989, at which A Claim of Right for Scotland, a call for the creation of a Scottish Parliament, was signed by 58 out of 72 Scottish Members of Parliament. It was organised by the Campaign for a Scottish Assembly. The Scottish Parliament was declared open by the Queen on 1 July 1999.

Between 1999 and 2004 the Assembly Hall was the temporary debating chamber of the Scottish Parliament. The access to this facility was via a new glazed porch, discreetly placed in the SW corner of Mylne's Court off the Lawnmarket in the midst of some of the University of Edinburgh's Halls of Residence. All traces of this porch were eradicated, and the west wall where it stood returned to a blank wall, immediately after the new parliament opened. The old (and uncomfortable) dark green leather bench seating was removed. Temporary (and removable) desks and seating were installed and the Hall was carpeted. The Church of Scotland used the Edinburgh International Conference Centre for the 1999 General Assembly and the Usher Hall in 2001. When the Assembly Hall was returned to the Church of Scotland, the decision was taken not to reinstate the Victorian seating, and more modern auditorium-style seating was installed.

The Presiding Officer of the Scottish Parliament had an office within the Assembly Hall buildings; all other parliamentary offices were located in the former Midlothian County Buildings or the former extension to Midlothian County Buildings on the opposite side of the George IV Bridge.

=== Edinburgh Festivals ===
The first dramatic success of the Edinburgh International Festival happened in 1948 and it was staged to great acclaim at the Assembly Hall on the Mound—an adaptation of Sir David Lyndsay's The Thrie Estaites, the first performance of this play since 1552. During the 1993 Festival, Alastair Cording's adaptation of Lewis Grassic Gibbon's A Scots Quair trilogy was produced in the Assembly Hall by TAG Theatre Company.

Until 1999, the Assembly Hall was rarely used except for meetings of the General Assembly and performances during the Edinburgh International Festival. The hall continues today, each August, to be used as a venue for the Edinburgh Festival Fringe. The hall is operated as a venue by the coincidentally named company Assembly, who are named after, but organisationally unconnected to, the Assembly Rooms, which they also run during the Fringe.

== See also ==
- Church of Scotland Offices

Preceded by Parliament House, Edinburgh	Home of the Scottish Parliament; 1999–2004	Succeeded by Scottish Parliament Building
