= Claim of Right 1989 =

A Claim of Right for Scotland was a document crafted by the Campaign for a Scottish Assembly in 1988, declaring the sovereignty of the Scottish people. It was signed by all then-serving Labour and Liberal Democrat MPs, with the exception of Tam Dalyell (Labour), a strident opponent of devolution. It was also boycotted by the Conservative Party and Scottish National Party both of whom believed the document to be illegitimate. The list of signatories included several MPs who would later attain high office, including future prime minister Gordon Brown, future chancellor Alistair Darling, and future leaders of the Liberal Democrats Charles Kennedy and Menzies Campbell.

The Claim of Right was signed at the General Assembly Hall, on the Mound in Edinburgh on 30 March 1989 by 58 of Scotland's 72 Members of Parliament, 7 of Scotland's 8 MEPs, 59 out of 65 Scottish regional, district and island councils, and numerous political parties, churches and other civic organisations, e.g., trade unions.

Its title was a reference to the Claim of Right Act 1689.

In October 2011, the Scottish Government, led by the SNP which opposed the Claim of Right when it was originally produced, announced that the Claim of Right would be brought before the Scottish Parliament to allow MSPs to re-endorse the claims of the sovereignty of the Scottish people. The Claim of Right was debated in the Scottish Parliament on 26 January 2012.

== Text of the Claim ==
The Claim of Right reads:

We, gathered as the Scottish Constitutional Convention, do hereby acknowledge the sovereign right of the Scottish people to determine the form of Government best suited to their needs, and do hereby declare and pledge that in all our actions and deliberations their interests shall be paramount.

We further declare and pledge that our actions and deliberations shall be directed to the following ends:

To agree a scheme for an Assembly or Parliament for Scotland;

To mobilise Scottish opinion and ensure the approval of the Scottish people for that scheme; and

To assert the right of the Scottish people to secure implementation of that scheme.

== Legal significance ==
The Claim of Right has never had or claimed any legal force.

== Debate in the House of Commons ==
On 4 July 2018, the House of Commons debated the Claim of Right in an Opposition Day debate selected by the SNP, which had previously opposed the document. This motion noted that the people of Scotland are sovereign and that they have the right to determine the best form of government for Scotland's needs.

This was a non-binding debate and did not create any legal recognition of the Claim of Right or have any legal significance.

== See also ==
- Claim of Right Act 1689
- Popular sovereignty
- Scottish Covenant Association
- Scots law
