= Tourism in Wales =

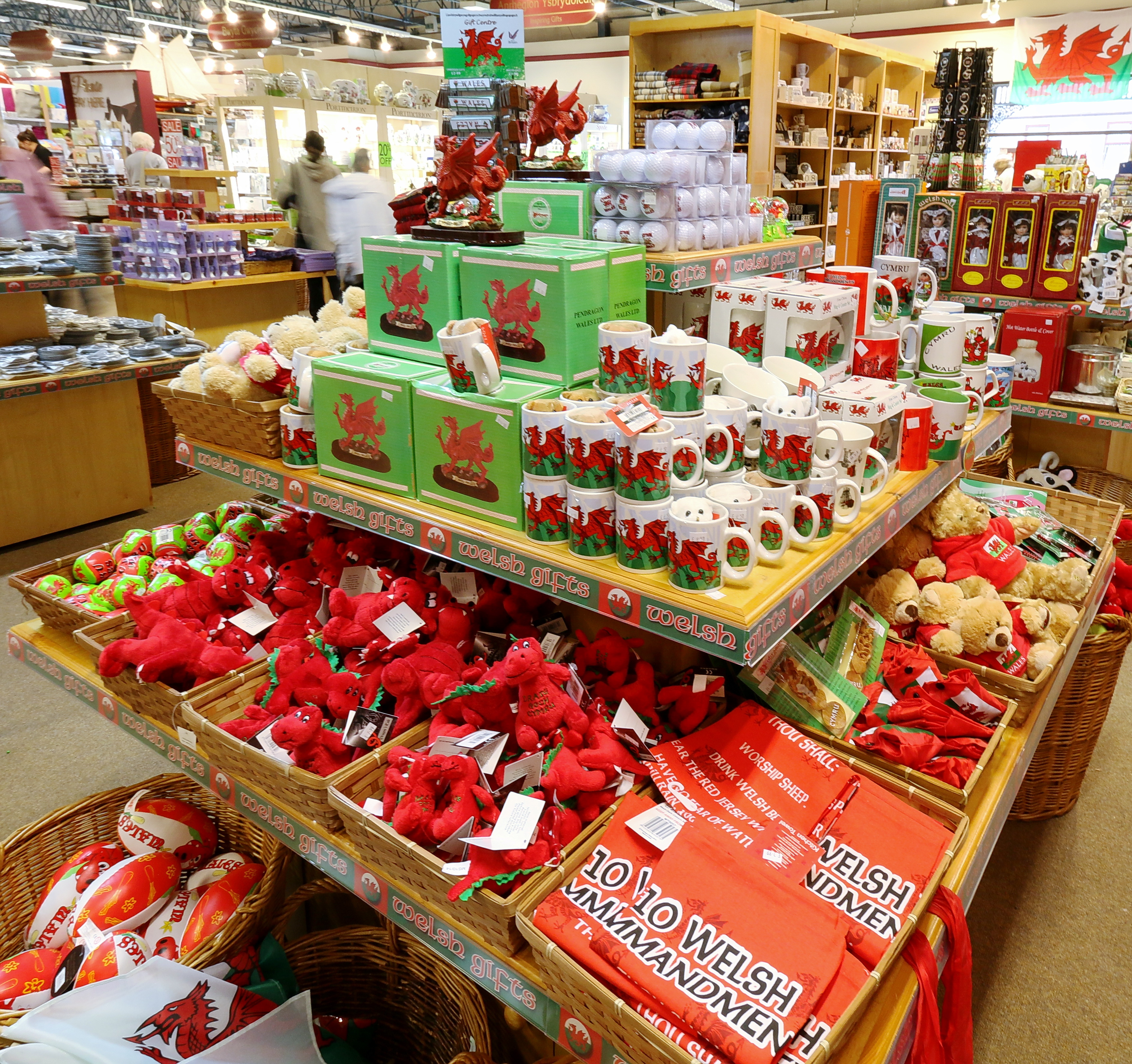
Tourist memorabilia on sale in Llanfairpwllgwyngyll, Anglesey

Tourism in Wales makes up a significant portion of the Welsh economy and attracts millions of visitors each year. The tourism industry in Wales was worth around £5bn in 2017. The tourism industry also makes a significant contribution to the Welsh economy, supporting over 100,000 jobs and more than 8% of the Welsh workforce. particularly from the Republic of Ireland, Germany, the United States, France and the Netherlands.

== Visitors and economic contribution ==
Wales is an emerging tourist destination, with 9.39m visitors to Conwy alone in 2018 and 8,078,900 visitors to National Trust and Wales Tourist Board destinations in 2002. As of 2017 the tourism industry in Wales has been estimated to have an annual turnover of £4.8 billion.

In 2005, tourism contributed to the economy of Wales, supporting over 100,000 service-sector jobs, more than 8% of the country's workforce. The most popular activities undertaken by tourists in Wales were walking, shopping, hiking in the mountains, and visiting historic attractions, museums, and galleries. 970,000 overseas tourists visited Wales in 2015, spending £410m.

The capital, Cardiff, is the most popular area in Wales for tourists, with 14.6 million visitors in 2009, which provides 26,300 jobs in the sector. In 2004, tourists spent the most money in Gwynedd, followed by Conwy and Cardiff.

The main countries of origin of overseas visitors were the Republic of Ireland, the United States, and Germany. The majority of tourism, however, is from other parts of the UK (predominantly England). A 2016 study showed that 15% of overseas visitors to Wales came from the USA, followed by Australia at 13% and Germany at 12%.

== Attractions ==
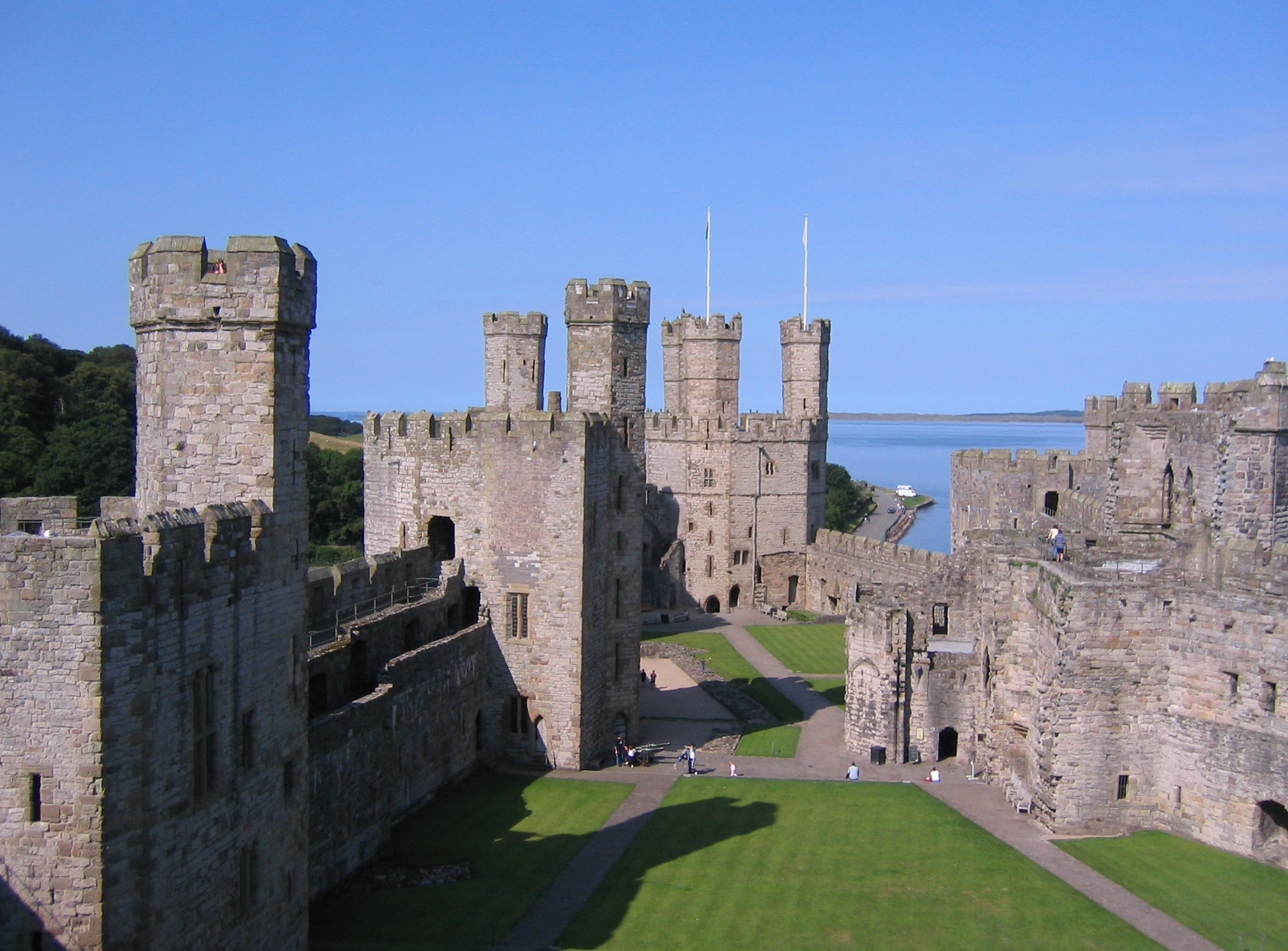
Caernarfon Castle, North Wales

The rich and varied landscape of Wales is a major attraction for tourism. There are three national parks: the Brecon Beacons National Park (now Bannau Brycheiniog), the Snowdonia National Park (now Eryri), and the Pembrokeshire Coast National Park. Popular activities in the national parks include hill walking, hiking, canoeing, mountain biking, kayaking and climbing. Wales is also becoming increasingly popular for 'extreme' sports, such as surfing, hang gliding, and downhill cycling (in which Wales hosts the 'Dragon Downhill Series'). The terrain of Wales has also attracted the World Rally Championship (WRC). The Wales Rally GB is held annually. The 2005 Wales Rally GB saw the first WRC stage set indoors at the Millennium Stadium. In Cardiff, the regenerated Cardiff Bay area is one of the most popular destinations.

Wales' history and culture also attract tourists. The Museum of Welsh Life, which focuses largely on Wales's industrial past, is currently the most popular tourist attraction in Wales, drawing over 600,000 visitors annually. The scars of the Industrial Revolution and Wales' industrial heritage can still be seen on parts of the Welsh landscape today. Many other places of historical interest attract large numbers of tourists: for example the many castles, such as Caernarfon Castle and Caerphilly Castle—most of them built to enable or to consolidate the English conquest of Wales, during the reign of the English king Edward I.

Another increasingly popular reason for visiting Wales, as with the rest of the United Kingdom—especially for those from North America—is genealogy, with many visitors coming to Wales to explore their family and ancestral roots. 1.8 million United States citizens are estimated to have Welsh ancestral roots, including former presidents, Abraham Lincoln and Thomas Jefferson.

== History ==
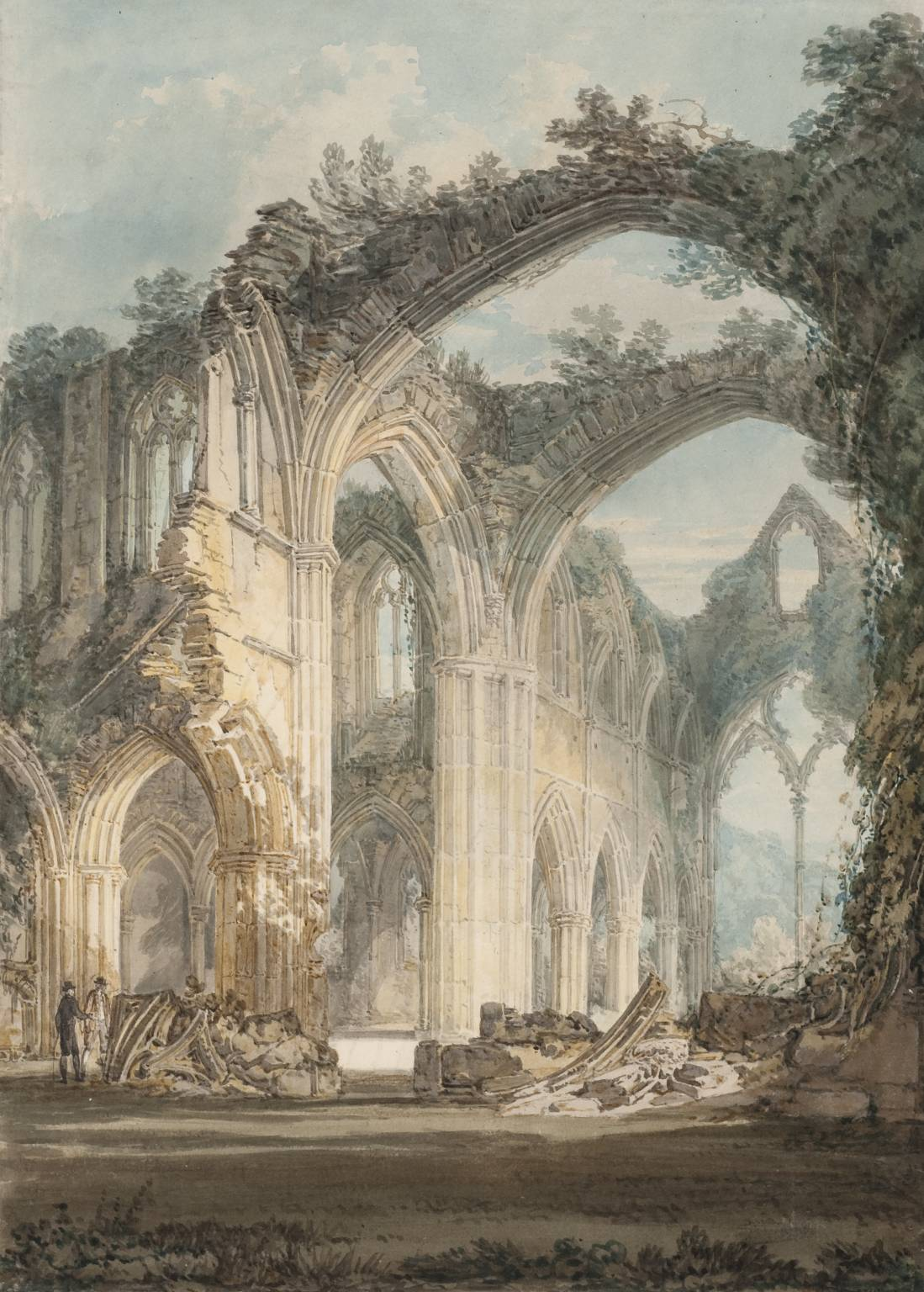
The Chancel and Crossing of Tintern Abbey, Looking towards the East Window by J. M. W. Turner, 1794

The Wye Valley witnessed the birth of British tourism in the 18th century. The area became widely known after Observations on the River Wye by the Reverend William Gilpin was published in 1782. The first illustrated tour guide to be published in Britain, it helped travellers locate and enjoy the most picturesque places, such as Tintern Abbey. A particular attraction of the Wye Valley was its river scenery, and the many guidebooks, engravings, and paintings encouraged a continuing steady stream of visitors which grew after the building of a new turnpike road up the valley in 1822 and the opening of a rail line in 1865.

However, when George Borrow wrote Wild Wales in 1862, it is clear from his descriptions that the notion of tourism in more mountainous parts of Wales hardly existed except for the most intrepid traveller. Indeed, he records that many locals regarded the mountainous and wild landscapes as monstrous and ugly rather than romantic or picturesque. However, later in the 19th century, the concept of mountains and valleys as both interesting and visually pleasing landscapes developed, and North Wales in particular benefited, as towns and villages such as Betws-y-Coed developed to accommodate the increasing numbers of visitors.

The changing face of industrialisation in the North West of England and in the Midlands, with increasing pay rates and the provision of paid time off for industrial workers, allowed many people to enjoy an annual holiday for the first time. Many chose to visit seaside resorts such as Llandudno, Prestatyn and Rhyl in North Wales, Aberystwyth and Barmouth in Mid Wales and Barry, Tenby, Swansea and Penarth in South Wales, which among others were developed to respond to this trend.

== Infrastructure ==
Wales is connected to the rest of the United Kingdom (its principal tourist market) by road, rail and domestic flights. The M4 Motorway connects South and West Wales with Southern England and London. The A55 road is the principal route linking North Wales with North West England.

There are several major rail links between England and Wales. Regular trains operate to Cardiff Central, Newport and Swansea from London Paddington, and to Cardiff Central from Portsmouth, Gloucester, Birmingham New Street, Manchester Picadilly, Nottingham and Newcastle. Cardiff Central offers connections to the South Wales Valleys, the Vale of Glamorgan, and West Wales, and Swansea offers connections to West Wales. There are direct services from London Euston and Birmingham to Holyhead via the North Wales Coast. Internally, there are services from Cardiff to Holyhead.

Cardiff Airport offers domestic and international flights. Domestically, Loganair operates flights to Edinburgh, and Aer Lingus provides a service to Belfast City. The previously operated twice-daily return flights to Anglesey are no longer in service. International flights are operated by carriers such as Ryanair, TUI Airways, and Vueling, which offer regular and seasonal services to destinations across Europe, North Africa, and the Middle East.

The country is also connected to Ireland by car ferry services operating daily from Welsh ports, principally the ports at Holyhead. These services are frequent and usually operated by fast ferries.

== COVID-19 pandemic ==
During much of 2020 and well into 2021, the restrictions and lockdowns necessitated by the COVID-19 pandemic negatively affected all sectors of the economy and "tourism and hospitality suffered notable losses from the pandemic" across the UK. As of 6 April 2021, visitors from "red list" countries were still not allowed to enter unless they were UK residents. Restrictions will "likely be in place until the summer", one report predicted, with June being the most likely time for tourism from other countries to begin a rebound. On 12 April 2021, many tourist facilities were still closed in Wales but non-essential travel between Wales and England was finally permitted. Wales also allowed non-essential retail stores to open. The outdoor areas of restaurants and pubs would reopen on 26 April 2021.

== 182 Nights Campaign For Wales Tourism ==
In April 2023, legislation was passed requiring holiday lets to let properties for 182 days a year to qualify for cheaper business rates. A consultation was launched in August 2025 by the Welsh Government to seek views on two key changes to how the rules are applied. Firstly, potentially allowing holiday let owners to use an average of 182 days let over several years, meaning those who miss out in one year can rely on the average over the previous two or three years to maintain their target. Secondly, allowing up to fourteen days of free holidays donated to charity to count towards the 182-day target.

Local businesses have been drawing on support from holiday let owners and holiday makers to lobby the Members of the Senedd to move to 105 nights citing the rules for England and Scotland are much more relaxed at 70 nights.

== See also ==
- List of Blue Flag Beaches of Wales
- Museums in Wales
- National parks of Wales
- List of World Heritage Sites in Wales
- Wales Coast Path
- List of castles in Wales
- List of tourist attractions in Wales
