= List of tourist attractions in Wales =

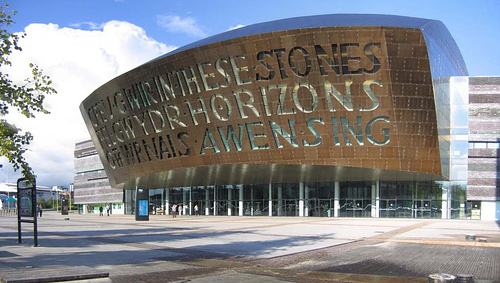
The Wales Millennium Centre

This is a list of tourist attractions in Wales, sorting attractions by settlement, protected area and popularity from across the country of Wales, United Kingdom.

== By settlement ==
The following list are of attractions in notable settlements in Wales.

- Cardiff – Is the capital and largest city. The city has three major performing arts venues: the Wales Millennium Centre, St David's Hall and New Theatre. Other tourist attractions include Cardiff Castle, Millennium Stadium, SWALEC Stadium, National Museum of Wales, Museum of Welsh Life, Llandaff Cathedral, Castell Coch, St. David's and in Cardiff Bay, Techniquest, Cardiff International Pool, Cardiff International White Water, the Senedd and the Pierhead Building. There is an unstaffed Tourist Information Centre in the city centre's Old Library.
- Swansea – the second-largest city. Attractions here include the Dylan Thomas Centre, Dylan Thomas trail, National Waterfront Museum, Glynn Vivian Art Gallery. The Gower Peninsula is the first Area of Outstanding Natural Beauty in Wales and sites such as Worm's Head and Rhossili are considered scenic.
- Newport – the third-largest city in Wales. An influx of visitors occurred in 2010 when the city hosted golf's Ryder Cup at the Celtic Manor Resort. Attractions include Tredegar House and Gardens, the Transporter Bridge, the ancient Roman fortress at Caerleon and National Roman Legion Museum. The Big Pit National Coal Museum is at Blaenavon.
- Wrexham – Wales' newest city, and largest settlement in north Wales, which was awarded the status in 2022. The city houses Wales' oldest football club, Wrexham A.F.C., housed in the world's oldest still in use international stadium, the Racecourse Ground, one of the Seven Wonders of Wales at St Giles' Church, Wales' largest music festival Focus Wales, Tŷ Pawb, Xplore!, the oldest German-style lager brand Wrexham Lager, and the country house at Erddig.
- Bangor – the oldest city in Wales and its cathedral dates to the 6th century. The city is located in Gwynedd in North West Wales, near the Menai Strait waters. Bangor also has a pier and a National Trust mansion known as Penrhyn Castle as well as Wales' longest High Street.
- St Asaph, in Denbighshire with a population of 3,500, awarded city status in 2012.
- St David's – the smallest city in Wales and is a cathedral in Pembrokeshire, Wales, lying on the River Alun. It is the resting place of Saint David, Wales's patron saint, and named after him.
- Llandudno – among the top three holiday destinations in Wales. Attractions in include the promenade, its beach, the Alice in Wonderland trail, the Great Orme, its cablecar and its tramway.
- Dolgellau – a town located close to Cadair Idris mountain on the approach to the Afon Mawddach estuary. Other attractions include the Mawddach Trail, Precipice Walk and Coed-y-Brenin biking centre.
- Aberystwyth – a coastal university town and popular holiday resort and may be a "convenient base" for the Coastal Way. The town has a promenade, castle and university and is the home of the National Library of Wales, Aberystwyth Arts Centre and Vale of Rheidol Railway.
- Hay on Wye – The town hosts the Hay Festival and the How the Light Gets In festival.

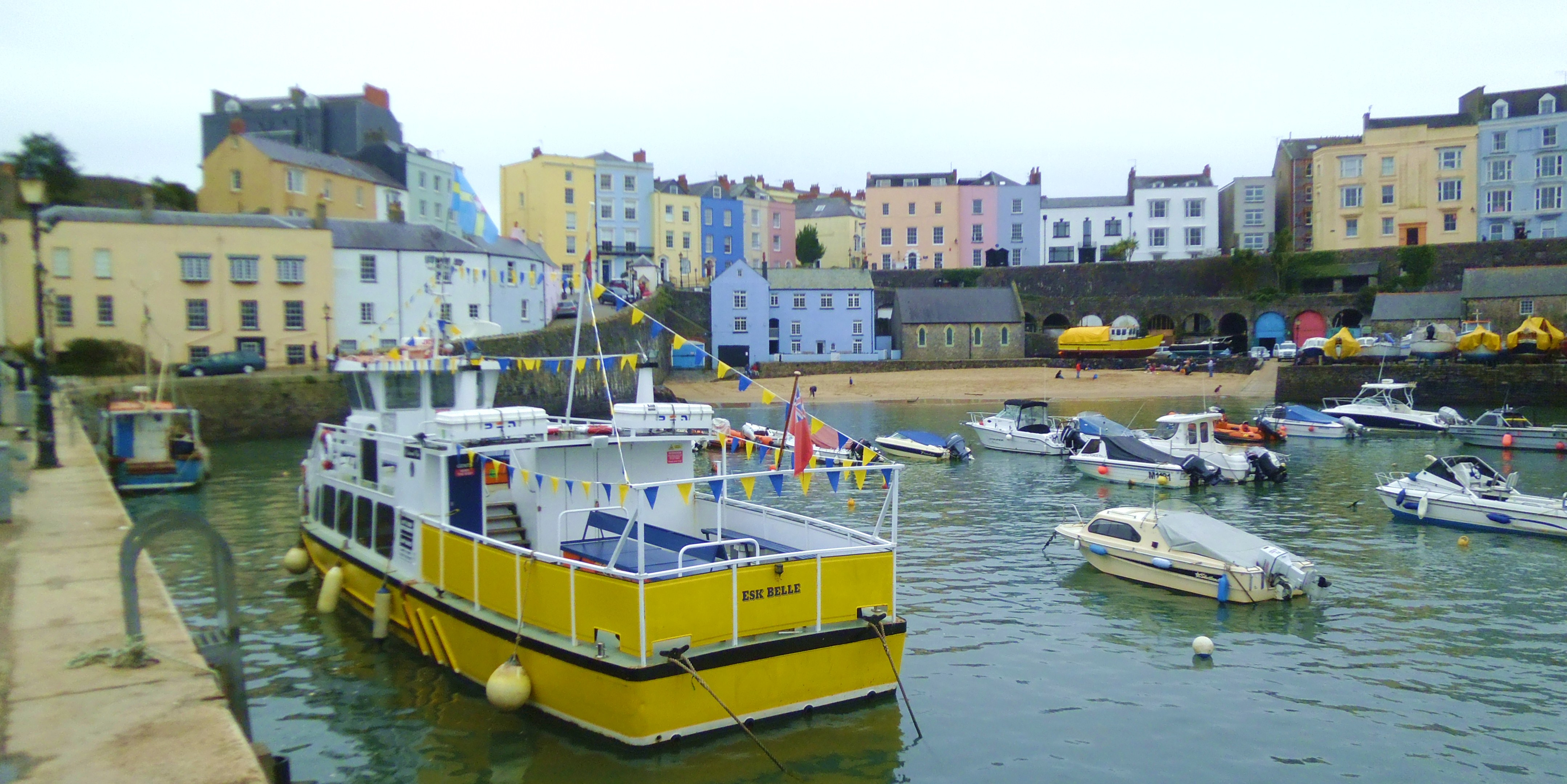
Tenby harbour.

- Tenby – featured as Wales' most popular holiday destination in recent years.
- Merthyr Tydfil – attractions include Cyfarthfa Castle, Cyfartha museum and art gallery, BikePark Wales (the biggest mountain biking resort in Wales), Rock UK Summit Centre, Parkwood Outdoors Dolygaer, Brecon Mountain Railway, Redhouse Cymru, Joseph Parry's Cottage, Garwnant Visitor Centre on the edge of the Brecon Beacons, and multiple golf courses.
- Barry – a seaside town that includes Barry Island. Its attractions include beaches, Barry Island Pleasure Park, and various sites associated with Gavin and Stacey TV series.

== National parks ==
At present, Wales has three national parks: Snowdonia, Pembrokeshire Coast and the Brecon Beacons National Park, as well as five areas of outstanding natural beauty (AONB), which together form the Protected areas of Wales.

Name	Photo	Principal area(s)	Date formed	Area
Snowdonia (Eryri)		Gwynedd, Conwy 52°54′N 3°51′W	18 October 1951	2,142 square kilometres (827.0 sq mi)
Pembrokeshire Coast (Arfordir Penfro)		Pembrokeshire 51°50′N 5°05′W	29 February 1952	620 square kilometres (239.4 sq mi)
Brecon Beacons (Bannau Brycheiniog)		Blaenau Gwent, Carmarthenshire, Merthyr Tydfil, Powys, Rhondda Cynon Taf, Monmouthshire, Torfaen, Caerphilly 51°53′N 3°26′W	17 April 1957	1,351 square kilometres (521.6 sq mi)

== Landscape features ==
Many features of the Welsh landscape that are popular with visitors, include:

- Snowdon in Snowdonia is the highest mountain in Wales.
- Pen y Fan is the highest peak in South Wales and is located in Brecon Beacons National Park.

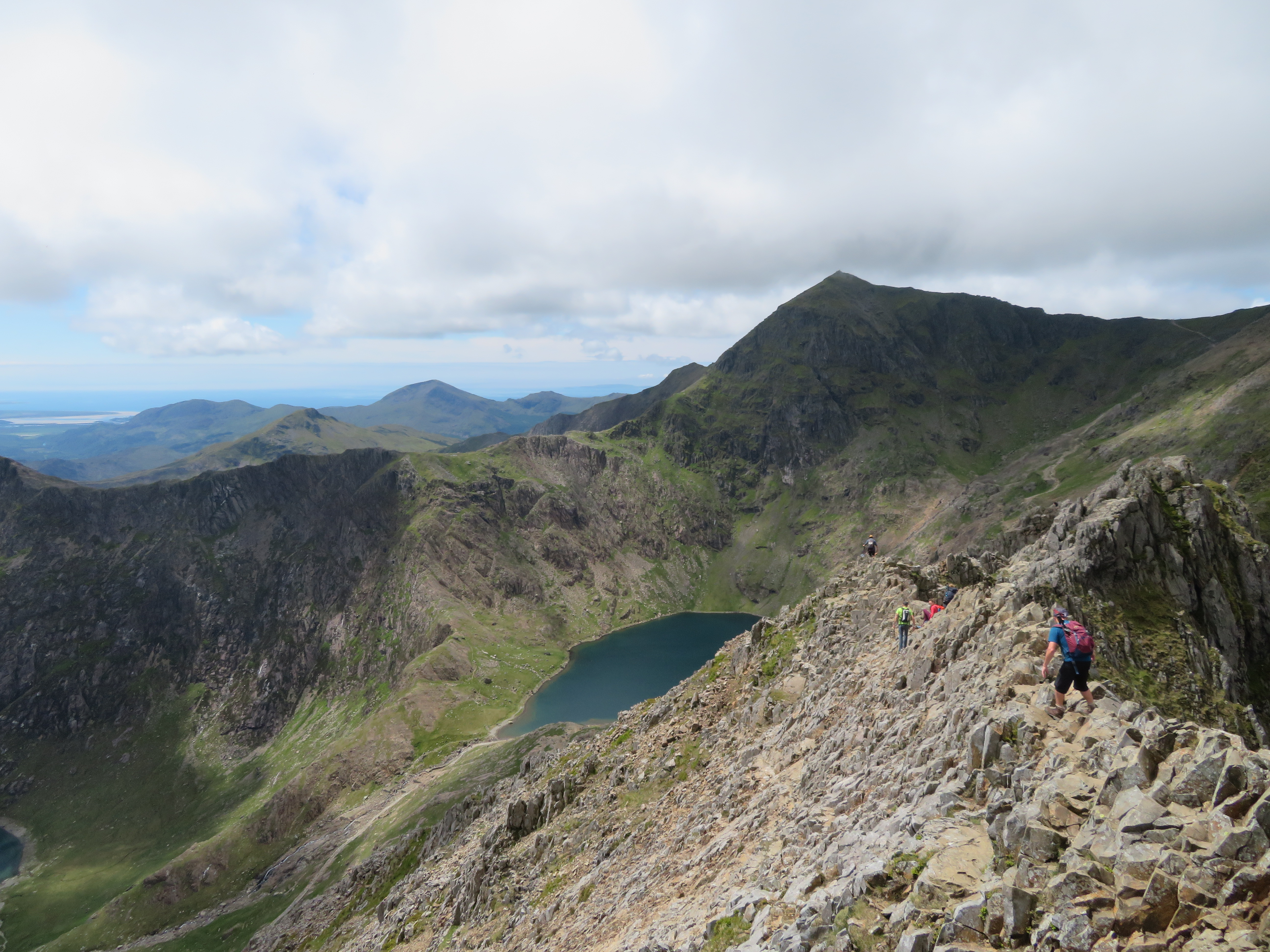
Snowdon (Yr Wyddfa), the highest mountain in Wales.

- Wye Valley Area of Outstanding Natural Beauty
- Offa's Dyke Path is an 8th-century monument and long distance footpath on the Welsh-English border.
- Taff Trail is a foot and cycle path running along the River Taff through the city and countryside, from Cardiff Bay to Brecon.
- Glyndŵr's Way is a long-distance trail between Knighton and Welshpool in Powys.
- The Gower Peninsula is the first Area of Outstanding Natural Beauty in Wales and sites such as Worm's Head and Rhossili are considered scenic.
- The Vale of Neath includes multiple waterfalls and has been included in a list of the ‘World’s Top 10 places to ride’ according to ‘What Mountain Bike’.
- The Wales Coast Path, an 870 mile long-distance footpath which follows the whole of the coastline of Wales.

== Independent attractions ==
There are several notable independent attractions:

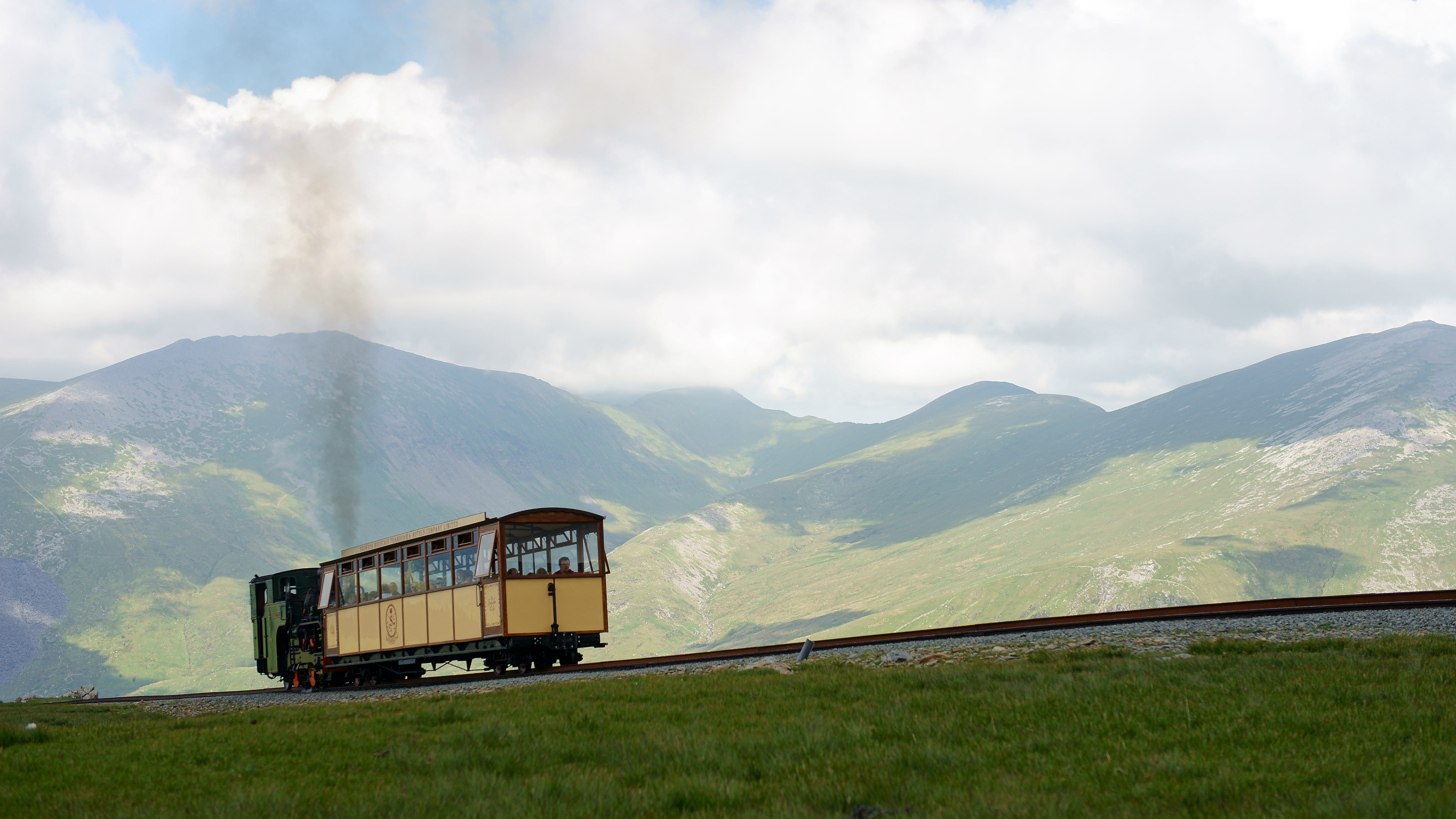
- Snowdon Mountain Railway
  Llanberis offers the Snowdon Mountain Railway, National Slate Museum, the Llanberis Lake Railway, Electric Mountain and Padarn country park.
- Oakwood Theme Park, Pembrokeshire
- National Botanic Garden of Wales, Carmarthenshire
- WWT Llanelli Wetland Centre, Carmarthenshire
- Great Little Trains of Wales, all twelve heritage steam railways in Wales.
- Folly Farm Adventure Park and Zoo
- Brecon Mountain Railway

== Top 10 paid attractions ==
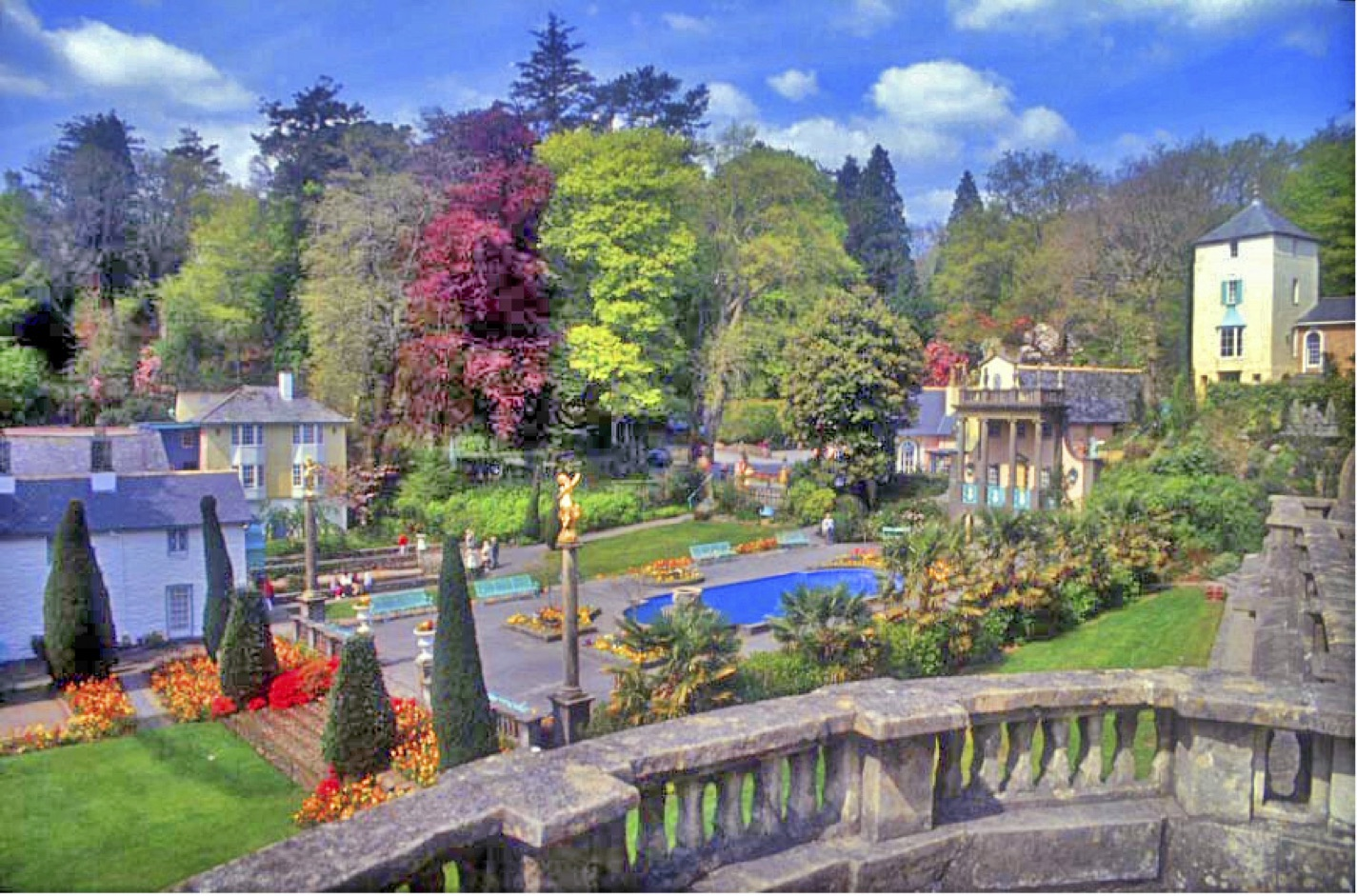
Portmeirion

The following are the most popular paid attractions in Wales (2019) in order of the number of visits:

1. LC, Swansea – a waterpark and leisure complex
2. Cardiff Castle
3. Folly Farm
4. Bodnant Garden
5. Portmeirion
6. Zip World Fforest
7. Dyffryn Gardens
8. Welsh Mountain Zoo
9. National Botanic Garden of Wales
10. Zip World Penrhyn Quarry

== Top 8 free attractions ==
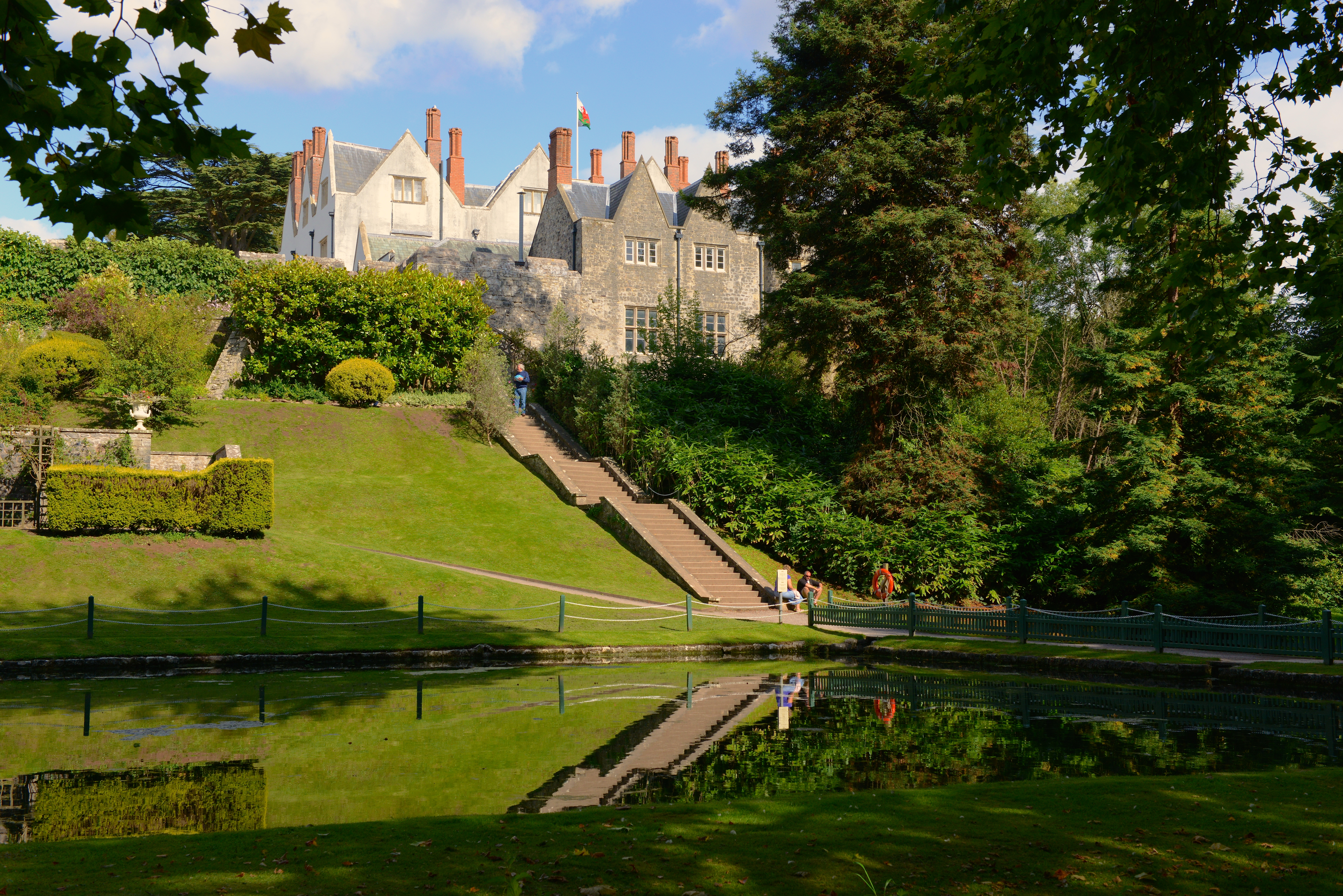
St Fagans National Museum of History

The Association of Leading Visitor Attractions (ALVA) report for 2023 lists the following eight free-admission Welsh attractions in order of the number of visits (the first figure is visitor numbers the second, the attraction's UK ranking):

1. St Fagans National Museum of History (594,990) (61)
2. National Museum Cardiff (378,349) (108)
3. National Waterfront Museum (228,271) (157)
4. National Slate Museum (135,809) (208)
5. Big Pit National Coal Museum (116,906) (218)
6. WWT Llanelli Wetlands Centre (57,179) (270)
7. National Roman Legion Museum (57,030) (273)
8. National Wool Museum (19,605) (322)

== See also ==
- Wales Coast Path
- Castles in Wales
- Abbeys and priories in Wales
- List of museums in Wales
- Heritage railways in Wales
- Tourism in Wales
