= Glyndŵr National Park =

Proposed national park in Wales

Glyndŵr National Park (proposed)
- Parc Cenedlaethol Glyndŵr
- Map of the proposed boundaries of the park as of September 2025. The AONB is outlined in faint light green, with an inset of Wales's protected areas to the top-left. This map's boundaries are simplified.
- Location: Denbighshire, Flintshire, Powys and Wrexham, plus a small part of Gwynedd
- Coordinates: 53.1°N 3.1°W
- Area: 927 square kilometres (358 sq mi)
- Designation: Proposed national park
- Named for: Owain Glyndŵr
- Website: Official website

Map of the existing Clwydian Range and Dee Valley AONB in Wales, which the national park is proposed to replace

Glyndŵr National Park (Welsh: Parc Cenedlaethol Glyndŵr) is a proposed national park which, if approved, will be located in the north-east of Wales. The park is intended to replace the Clwydian Range and Dee Valley, a designated Area of Outstanding Natural Beauty (AONB), and expand the area of protected landscape. The proposed name is taken from Owain Glyndŵr, who was from north-east Wales and the last native Welsh person to claim the title Prince of Wales.

The 1947 Hobhouse Report suggested that the Clwydian and Berwyn ranges of hills should be protected, but it was not until 1985 that the Clwydian Range AONB was established. The possibility of making the range a national park was debated by the Welsh Assembly (now the Senedd) in 2010, but did not progress further. In 2011, the AONB was extended to include the Dee Valley, which includes the northernmost part of the Berwyn range.

The proposal was revived in 2021, when Welsh Labour committed to designating a new national park to cover the Clwydian Range and Dee Valley. Following the party's victory in that year's Senedd election, the Welsh Government commissioned Natural Resources Wales (NRW) to develop proposals for the national park, and research and consultations took place between 2023 and 2025. These have resulted in a proposal to expand the protected area north to include the Gronant and Talacre dunes, south to include the majority of the Berwyn range and Dyfnant Forest, and west to include the area around Llanelidan. The total area of the proposed park is 927 square kilometres (358 sq mi); the AONB has an area of 389.26 square kilometres (150.29 sq mi).

The creation of the national park is supported by Natural Resources Wales; the body organised a consultation in 2025 in which 53 per cent of responses supported the proposal, 14 per cent conditionally supported it, and 31 per cent were opposed. Labour and Conservative members of the Senedd have expressed support, as has the Campaign for National Parks, which issued a joint statement supported by bodies including the National Trust, Royal Society for the Protection of Birds Cymru, and the World Wide Fund for Nature. The plans have been opposed by councillors from Denbighshire County Council, Flintshire County Council, Powys County Council, and Wrexham County Borough Council, and a public inquiry is now planned to be held regarding the decision.

The park did not meet the May 2026 deadline set by the then Welsh Labour government. Following Labour's loss at the 2026 Senedd election, the new Plaid Cymru government announced in October 2026 that they would not proceed with the inquiry. Cabinet Minister for Government Effectiveness and the Constitution Dafydd Trystan Davies said that the Welsh government could achieve its environmental goals without setting up the park, although Davies would listen to all views for a four-week period before making a final decision.

== History ==
=== Background ===
The 1947 Hobhouse Report, the precursor to the National Parks and Access to the Countryside Act 1949, recommended establishing conservation areas to cover the Clwydian and Berwyn ranges of hills, however this was not done.

The Clwydian Range was eventually designated an Area of Outstanding Natural Beauty (AONB) in 1985 by the Secretary of State for Wales, Nicholas Edwards, under the National Parks and Access to the Countryside Act 1949. It originally covered 158 km^{2} (61 sq mi), and its southern boundary was set to be much further north than originally proposed in 1947. Reasons for this decision remain unclear, although it has been said that it was chosen to mark the border between the Clwydian Range and the uplands sometimes regarded to be part of the Berwyn Range. This was due to local opposition to designations for the Berwyn Range, such as the Site of Special Scientific Interest (SSSI) which was proposed during the AONB's consultation period. This potentially influenced the decision to exclude the Berwyn Range, and therefore the Dee Valley, from becoming part of the AONB in 1985.

On 22 November 2011, the AONB was to be extended southwards to include the Dee Valley, increasing the size of the AONB by 229 km^{2} (88 sq mi). The Ceiriog Valley was not added to the AONB, due to the valley's physical relationship with the Berwyn mountain range which crosses the local authority border into Powys, where an extension of the AONB is not supported. An artificial cut-off point of the AONB at the Wrexham—Powys border was deemed illogical, so the southernmost boundary of the AONB was defined as the skyline of the Dee Valley (the southern summits of the highest peaks in the valley) instead.

=== Initial 2010 calls ===
The campaign to make the then Clwydian Range AONB, a national park began in 2010, on the 25th anniversary of AONB status. Conservative AM for Clwyd West, Darren Millar called for National Park status, describing the area as a "national treasure" needing extra recognition for its unique biodiversity and archaeology, which would boost the local economy. On 16 February 2011, in an Assembly debate, Jane Davidson AM, then Environment, Sustainability and Housing Minister for Wales, dismissed the proposal, stating that if it were to follow through, it would have to be applied to all other AONBs in Wales and that the area already benefits from tourism support. Criticism to the proposal followed at the time, touted as "out of touch" with the wishes of the rural community, potentially limiting rural business opportunities and taking power away from local authorities.

AONBs and National Parks (dark green) in Wales. The CRDV is located to the north-east of the country, shaded in a lighter green.

=== Announcement of 2020s proposals ===
In their manifesto for the 2021 Senedd election, Welsh Labour and First Minister of Wales Mark Drakeford, pledged to establish a new national park in Wales. If followed through, the newly designated area would become Wales' fourth national park and the first one since 1957. Upon their re-election, the new administration stated that they were in the process of fulfilling this pledge, although no dates were given, however, they stated that announcements would be made in "due course", and that the redesignation is a "multi-year" project. In its 2021–2026 Programme for Government, the Welsh Government committed itself to designate a new national park in north-east Wales.

In June 2023, the Welsh Government commissioned Natural Resources Wales (NRW) to investigate a potential designation of the area as a national park, involving data and evidence gathering and meeting with local communities, with a decision expected by 2026. While the proposed national park is centred on the AONB, the boundaries of the national park may not be the same as the current AONB, with the exact boundaries being under discussion. From October to November 2023, NRW held seven engagement events (including one online), as part of its engagement period from 9 October 2023 to 27 November 2023. The consultation process is funded by the Welsh Government at a cost of £700,000 annually. The government hopes to make a decision before the 2026 Senedd election. NRW announced they hope to hold two further consultations in autumn 2024 and 2025, as the boundaries of the park become more refined.

In February 2024, it was announced that NRW was looking for consultants to carry out an in-depth assessment of the proposed areas for inclusion.

== Debate ==
There is a mix of support and opposition to the proposals, with various concerns and praises raised for the proposals.

=== Issues ===
- Tourism and economy – Supporters claim that national park status would bring more potential to the area, as many tourists from nearby densely populated areas of Cheshire, Merseyside, Greater Manchester and elsewhere in North West England, constantly pass through the AONB to Snowdonia (Eryri), the other national park in north Wales, and a national park would "put North East Wales on the map", while also catering to those wanting a countryside rather than coastal visit. Supporters estimate the re-designation would bring in 1.5 million visitors annually, boosting the local economy, providing more opportunities for locals and is a once-in-a-lifetime opportunity. A member of the Dee Valley Environmental Network claimed that the park would increase tourism in the area which has "stagnated" recently, while it would also ease the burden of overcrowding during peak times in Snowdonia (Eryri).
- Funding and management – Concerns were raised that a fourth national park in Wales would reduce the funding to the existing three. In October 2023, the Welsh Government stated it was too early to discuss the national park's possible functions and funding. The current national parks receive 75% of their funding from the Welsh Government, ranging from £3–4 million annually. A council levy also contributes over £1 million to the existing parks, although the Welsh Government pays back money to the councils. In late 2024, in response to concerns over funding, supporters argued that when the UK's first national parks were devised, the national debt was 270% of UK GDP and the UK was recovering following the Second World War. In November 2024, The Guardian reported that costs of the national park to Powys County Council, in which the council was expected to contribute 25% of the park's budget, would have led to £50.9 million of cuts needed over four years by the council. In September 2025, the Welsh Government committed that funding to the existing three national parks and the local councils would not have an impact on their finances. Natural Resources Wales argued the new designation would actually provide more money in comparison to the existing designation of Area of Outstanding Natural Beauty. Concerns were also raised that the new status would lead to the increased presence of the Welsh Government in the management of the area (over the local authorities) as the new status involves new funding from the government to the area.
- Environment – Proponents for the redesignation argue that it would hand over greater environmental and planning protections to the area. It has also been claimed that a national park would help efforts to combat runaway climate change. A local councillor claimed that redesignation may increase the risk of mountain fires (such as the 2018 Llantysilio Mountain fire), through cutting back hill farming (such as sheep grazing), leading to an increase in unmanaged vegetation.
- Size and proximity – Opponents initially criticised the size of the AONB itself as being too small for a national park. If redesignated alone, it would be the smallest national park in Wales at 150 sq mi (390 km^{2}) compared to the current smallest in Wales, Pembrokeshire Coast at 243 sq mi (630 km^{2}). In September 2025, the proposed area was stated to be 927 square kilometres (358 sq mi), although earlier 2023 proposals were slightly larger. Therefore, the new park would be larger than the Pembrokeshire Coast National Park. It was also claimed that the proximity to the English border would lead to shorter day-trips rather than longer overnight stays. There were also concerns on the potential overuse of "national park," fearing it will dilute the attractiveness of existing ones.
- Previous commitments and transparency – The proposal has been described as a "betrayal" by an FUW local officer, stating that the earlier plan to expand the AONB to the Dee Valley was followed through despite a majority of the union opposing the plan, and opposition from rural businesses. It has been claimed that a last-minute compromise was promised that "the area would not become a national park". The Welsh Government was criticised in October 2021, when it was revealed that no consultations had taken place between farmers and the Welsh Government concerning the proposal.
- Second homes and community – Concerns over second (holiday) homes were raised, with the existing crisis in Gwynedd, where holiday homes account for 11% of the entire county's housing stock, being shown as a warning. The concerns were raised by former leader of the Liberal Democrats Tim Farron, who warned that national park status would potentially replicate the crisis already in Gwynedd in north-east Wales, and lead the area to be treated like a "playground" for the well-off. He also drew parallels with the effects felt on villages which in 2016 were made part of an extended Yorkshire Dales National Park in England. Additional concerns were raised over increased visitor numbers as a result of national park status, which would increase local prices and impact on the fabric of the rural Welsh-speaking communities. what happens to existing farmland, and the implications for farmers as raised by members of the Farmers' Union of Wales. The Welsh Government responded to concerns over new planning restrictions potentially impacting the housing shortage in Wales, hampering local social housing projects. Minister for Climate Change, Julie James, stated: "There are a number of steps we are already taking across Wales to mitigate [social housing] issues".

In September 2025, Natural Resources Wales summarised a list of potential pros-and-cons for its 2025 consultations. The pros, summarised by the headings, were; enhanced protection of landscapes, boost climate and nature recovery, agricultural opportunities, secure long-term funding, planning powers, economic growth & tourism benefits, access and health benefits, enhanced cultural heritage protection, opportunity for more community engagement & good regional governance, and a long-term legacy for future generations, while the cons, as summarised by the headings, were; tourism pressures, housing affordability, planning restrictions, perceived loss of local control, access conflicts, transition, and administrative complexity.

=== Public opinion ===
In the NRW 2023 Engagement report, 51% of respondents supported a national park, while 42% opposed it. Amongst those supporting, they stated the proposal would raise the profile of the area, attract investment, protect the area from unwanted developments, boost conservation and re-shape the local economy away from an "over-reliance on farming" to a more "broadbased economy" centred on sustainable tourism. Amongst those opposing, concerns centred on littering, planning restrictions, over-tourism, and house prices.

In July 2024, a group of organisations, led by Campaign for National Parks, and including signatory organisations such as the National Trust, RSPB Cymru, and WWF, have welcomed the proposals. However they urge the government to ensure the national park is set up in a way that allows it to emphasise tackling climate change, promoting species recovery, maintaining community resilience, modern governance, and that its boundaries consider the biodiversity of the area's species and habitats.

Support spans the two main sides of the political spectrum, with both Conservative and Labour Members of the Senedd supporting a redesignation. Plaid Cymru and the Welsh Liberal Democrats have not expressed party support for a new national park, although their parties' councillors in Powys expressed opposition to it in December 2023. In October 2024, Llyr Gruffydd, Plaid Cymru MS for North Wales, raised three concerns still needing to be addressed in the proposal, these being; clarification on funding, discussing potential local impacts, and ensuring communities back the proposal before it is imposed on them. The proposals were described as "a bonkers idea", by a local councillor in 2021.

=== Council debates ===
On 10 December 2023, Powys County Council rejected plans for the new national park to extend into Powys. Opposition largely stemmed from Liberal Democrat and Plaid Cymru councillors who stated that the benefits of a new national park were not clearly stated by the government, and that an additional national park authority would put pressure on public finances, especially as funding for existing national park authorities were stated to have also decreased. A councillor expressed doubt that national park status would improve biodiversity or transport issues. A Conservative councillor stated there could be some benefits but all sides need to be looked at, especially any impact it would have on rural areas. In a meeting, where Plaid Cymru tabled a motion opposing the new national park, 34 councillors voted in favour of the motion which called for opposing the national park, four were against stating opposition to the park, while 16 abstained.

In February 2024, it was proposed a move by a local councillor should be put to Denbighshire County Council calling it to suspend talks over the new national park. This was due to concerns around the potential annual cost of £1 million for the new national park among the councils, with Denbighshire council already having financial difficulties. During the consultation period it was announced that 25% of the maintenance cost of the new national park would be funded by the councils, with the rest funded by the Welsh Government, estimating a £1 million annual cost to be put on councils. Although The Guardian in November 2024, reported that Powys may have to make £50 million worth of cuts over four years to provide funding for the national park.

In November 2024, a Powys councillor argued that if the national park were to go ahead, £2 million worth of the council's housing and economic growth development plans would become "redundant" and it would cost the council to replace it. The council is legally required to produce some plans by the Welsh Government. Another councillor stated that the national park, as well as the recent UK budget would make any area, not owned by large estates or farms, into a "play area for townies", rather than an area of living and vibrant communities. Russell George, Conservative MS for Montgomeryshire (covering north Powys), stated that the "overwhelming message" of 250 locals, who attended a village meeting in Llanrhaeadr discussing the park, was that the national park was "not welcome". The opposition was backed up by a Plaid Cymru councillor also attending, who launched a survey for Powys residents.

In December 2024, Flintshire County Council stated they cannot support plans for the national park until their main concerns on how the national park would be funded are addressed. The council raised concerns on the future short/long-term cost to the council and local residents, as well as concerns relating to any additional bureaucracy, the burden the national park places on the rest of Flintshire, the limitations on land for employment and housing, constrained growth for the national park, and how it may potentially reduce the value and funding towards Wales' existing national parks.

In November 2025, Denbighshire County Council councillors voted to reject the plans for the national park. Councillors raised concerns that national park status would lead to tighter planning legislation, while still having insufficient infrastructure that could not support the theorised increase in tourism, and not enough funding at a time the council is facing spending cuts. It was also questioned how much national park status would be better than the existing AONB, and its impacts to the community. The council's cabinet is to debate on the final decision on whether it recommends the national park. Councillors wished more clarity could be provided on the proposal, and suggested that the decision on a national park be delayed until after the 2026 election so more certainty could be given on funding.

In December 2025, Wrexham County Borough Council, also announced their opposition to the plans.

=== NRW approval ===
On 12 January 2026, the board of Natural Resources Wales announced they have agreed that a "Glyndŵr National Park Designation Order" to designate the national park should be made, following their review of the evidence and findings collected during the 2025 statutory consultation NRW conducted. The Welsh Government commissioned NRW as a statutory advisor on the proposal, reviewing whether it met legal definitions of a "national park", and what features and areas would such national park include, to then make a recommendation to the government. The board approved the proposal arguing it met the statutory tests and criteria for designation based on the area's natural beauty, geographical features and opportunities for sustainable tourism, but did recognise the feedback it received to the proposal, both support and opposition, and particularly the opposition expressed by local authorities.

Natural Resources Wales received 1,678 official responses to its consultation, and assessed that 53 per cent of them supported the proposal, 14 per cent conditionally supported it, and 31 per cent were opposed. Responses were received from across the UK, with the highest numbers from Denbighshire, Gwynedd, Flintshire, and Powys. Responses from residents of the area within the proposed national park boundaries were less positive, with 47 per cent in favour and 35 per cent opposed. A separate local survey, organised independently by two Wrexham councillors, reported 1,015 respondents opposed (98.8 per cent) , while only 2 repondents supported. NRW noted the independent survey but scrutinised its methodology as it used different forms, and did not include it in its official analysis to maintain the integrity of the survey NRW commissioned. One of the councillors that organised the local survey, criticised that their survey containing named and signed responses would be less recognised than the survey with the fewer and anonymous responses in NRW's consultation.

The consultation also received 13 requests for the boundaries to be amended, with campaigns to include areas such as Llandrillo and Mynydd Mynyllod in Denbighshire. There are to be no further adjustments to the proposed boundaries.

The Welsh Government is to further consider the proposal following a Public Notice period and receiving information and evidence, such as consultation responses, to then make a final decision and set out the next steps. The Public Notice period would last from 16 January 2026 to 15 February 2026. The current Welsh Government, led by Welsh Labour, pledged to designate a new national park in their 2021 election manifesto.

=== Public inquiry ===
In March 2026, the Welsh Government announced it would appoint Planning and Environment Decisions Wales (PEDW) to hold a public local inquiry on the proposed national park to allow the representations and objections made towards the proposal to be considered. This followed concerns being raised by all five councils the park is to cover, and several issuing formal objections to it. Therefore under the National Parks and Access to the Countryside Act 1949, a public local inquiry was now needed, which would involve the planning inspector to scrutinise the arguments for and against the proposal, and then make a recommendation to the Welsh ministers. As a result of the inquiry, the government could not make the decision before the 2026 Senedd election.

== Proposals ==
=== Designation ===
Natural Resources Wales (NRW) is the authority with the statutory powers to designate national parks in Wales. In order to evaluate whether there is a case for a new national park, NRW would host local consultations with communities and local authorities, check how suitable an area is to meet the legal definition of a national park, determine its boundaries, and finally make the recommendation on whether to establish a new national park to Welsh Ministers. The final decision on whether to designate a national park would be the responsibility of the Minister for Rural Affairs.

To be considered to be part of the national park, NRW would have to assess whether an area is significant and "picturesque enough" in the national context requiring national park status. This criterion is not solely based on picturesque natural visuals as it is "a wide-ranging concept" but would also involve wildness, tranquillity, heritage and culture.

To establish the national park, a national park authority for the park would be set up. However, the final role of such an authority has not been fully decided, in particular planning responsibility, and whether the authority would take control of all planning applications within the boundaries of the national park or whether local authorities would still hold some say. However, a Denbighshire County Councillor stated that, as he understands it, the North East Wales national park would not have a planning function.

=== First Consultation and 2023 Area of Search ===
The October 2023 Area of Search draft map showing the maximum possible area being considered to be part of the new national park. Existing Clwydian Range and Dee Valley AONB, to be part of any national park Maximum extent of possible additional areas to be considered for a national park These are not the final boundaries, and may have been simplified.

On 10 October 2023, NRW released an "area of search" map, a draft of the areas they are considering for inclusion within the boundaries of a national park, replacing the existing AONB covering parts of Denbighshire, Flintshire and Wrexham. The draft area is proposed to possibly extend from the AONB southwards, across the Berwyn range (to Llandrillo) in Denbighshire, and the Ceiriog Valley in Wrexham, and into north Powys (specifically north Montgomeryshire). In Powys, the area considered is as far south as Llanfair Caereinion, covering the Tanat, Vyrnwy (therefore Lake Vyrnwy), Banwy valleys, and westwards to reach Mallwyd, in Gwynedd and Snowdonia (Eryri) national park. This would possibly create a "U-shaped" protected area across North Wales. Smaller extensions around the existing AONB are also to be considered, such as Halkyn Mountain, between Holywell and Northop, Flintshire, around Hope Mountain and Caergwrle, and into the Vale of Clwyd. The area under consideration would be three times larger than the existing AONB, and would possibly span four principal areas (local authority areas), the existing Denbighshire, Flintshire and Wrexham, as part of the existing AONB but the possible addition of Powys as a fourth. The draft map, however, is not the final boundaries of the park, but the maximum area to consider, with it expected to be further refined as the consultation process progresses. Some areas may not meet NRW's criteria on what should be within a national park, and therefore possibly be excluded in further refined proposals.

Following the release of the Area of Search draft map in October 2023, residents in the neighbouring upper Dee Valley (between Bala and Corwen) and the Denbigh Moors (Mynydd Hiraethog) were questioning as to why they were not included in the proposed maximum boundaries. Some residents speculated that they were excluded to allow the development of wind farms in their area. NRW responded by stating that the Denbigh Moors was more associated with North West Wales and would lack "land continuity" with the rest of the proposed park, while the upper Dee Valley's mapped land value was considered "moderate", lower than NRW's criteria for inclusion in the new national park. NRW said, however, that they would consider any evidence presented that called for the areas to be included or excluded. A Flintshire County Councillor proposed all of North Wales become a national park.

In December 2023, Powys County Council rejected a national park to be within its boundaries.

A proposed boundary map was released in mid-2024, with another public consultation taking place in late 2024, and another final one in late 2025.

=== Second Consultation and 2024 Candidate Area ===
The October 2024 Candidate Area map showing the refined boundaries of the reduced maximum area now being considered to be part of the new national park.
Existing Clwydian Range and Dee Valley AONB, to be part of any national park
Current proposed additions
Rejected areas in Area of Search map
Rejected areas added during consultations
These are not the final boundaries, and may have been simplified.

In July 2024, NRW revealed a report on the public feedback it received in its October–November 2023 public engagement consultation.

The report identified eight areas that are to be considered further for inclusion in the new park. They are Halkyn Mountain, areas in Powys, north of Hope Mountain, Clywedog Valley, Park in the Past (near Hope, Flintshire), Caer Estyn hillfort, Mynydd Mynyllod and the Dee Valley at Llandrillo, Bryn Gwyn Hall and Rhug Estate.

Ten areas were raised by respondents for inclusion, with many being already rejected, but otherwise stated to not be included in the report. The areas to not be included were: Denbigh Moors, Llyn Brenig and Clocaenog Forest, the Vale of Clwyd, Pantasaph, Wepre Park, Nerquis Hall and Wynnstay Hall, Ruthin, Cambrian Mountains and Plynlimon (Pumlumon), Powis Castle, and the River Dee's water catchment area. The decision to not include Ruthin surprised local supporters, who then urged locals "to make their feelings known" in NRW's second consultation from October 2024.

In September 2024, NRW reported that their initial consultation raised eleven common topics among the almost 1,000 respondents. Some common topics included questions on outdoor recreation, renewable energy, culture, communities, tourism and infrastructure, land management, recognition, and funding for the park, as well as queries on the initial proposed boundaries.

In October 2024, NRW launched its second public consultation on the national park's boundaries, with the consultation lasting from October to December 2024.

In October 2024, NRW released a map on its "Candidate Area" for the new national park. The map refined the proposed boundaries of the park from the October 2023 Area of Search map with many areas, particularly near the northern parts of the existing AONB, being removed from the proposal. Many of the areas in the north were reduced to the existing AONB boundaries. Therefore most of the proposed additions are now all largely to the south of the AONB.

=== 2025 Consultation ===
The September 2025 map showing the defined boundaries of the park for the 2025 consultation. Existing Clwydian Range and Dee Valley AONB, to be part of any national park Areas to be added to a national park These boundaries have been simplified, some changes may still be made.

In September 2025, Natural Resources Wales announced the park would be called Glyndŵr National Park (Welsh: Parc Cenedlaethol Glyndŵr).

It is named after Owain Glyndŵr, the last native Prince of Wales. Natural Resources Wales stated the name was chosen as Glyndŵr was from the north-east and lived in Sycharth, which would be within the park. He also started his rebellion in the north-east, and the surname is based on Glyndyfrdwy, a region within the proposed park. There has also been a recent increase in interest in Owain Glyndŵr, which would award the park "instant name-recognition". However, NRW also stated that, as Glyndŵr is "closely associated" with Welsh independence and amid the recent growth of the movement, the name may be perceived as having a "pro-nationalist bias".

Multiple names were considered and put to a public vote:

- Glyndŵr (49%)
- Bryniau Clwyd a'r Berwyn (Welsh for 'Clwydian Range and Berwyn') (22.7%)
- The remaining 23% went to the other names of:
  - Powys Fadog
  - Ordovices (Welsh: Ordoficiaid)
  - Gororau ('borders')

These announcements are followed by the commencement of a 12-week statutory consultation from September to December 2025 on the new plans for the proposed national park, which were developed over two years.

The national park as now proposed would span an area of 927 square kilometres (358 sq mi). This is a third smaller than the originally proposed area in 2023, but still larger than the Pembrokeshire Coast National Park which is 629 km^{2} (243 sq mi) in size.

The new defined boundaries for the proposed national park would extend from the north Wales coast at Prestatyn, down through Flintshire and Wrexham County Borough, and end in the north of Powys. The boundaries have been modified since the previous consultations with a large part of Powys being removed, specifically parts of the Tanat and Meifod valleys, part of the River Vyrnwy, and the villages of Llanrhaeadr-ym-Mochnant, Llanfechain, and Llanfyllin (which was the initial southern boundary). The two large areas of farmland were removed due to strong public opposition. A part of the upper Dee valley was also removed while the Gronant and Talacre dunes (in Flintshire) were reinstated due to public outcry over its initial removal, which was due to built developments in the area. Its new southern boundary would be along the A458 road between Llanfair Caereinion and Mallwyd. As with previous consultations, a small area of Gwynedd, around Llandderfel, would also be included. The Daily Post described the park as resembling an "upside-down lizard hanging from the North Wales coast".

Overall, the proposed park is to include places like the Ceiriog Valley, Clwydian Range, Horseshoe Falls, Moel Famau, Chirk, Dyfnant Forest, Lake Vyrnwy, Llangollen and Pontcysyllte Aqueduct.
