= National parks of Wales =

Area of landscape in Wales

The three national parks of Wales

The national parks of Wales (Welsh: parciau cenedlaethol Cymru) are managed areas of outstanding landscape in Wales, United Kingdom where some forms of development are restricted to preserve the landscape and natural environment. Together, they cover 20% of the land surface of Wales and have a resident population of over 80,000 people. Each National Park Authority is a free-standing body within the local government framework.

At present, Wales has three national parks: Snowdonia (Eryri), created in 1951, Pembrokeshire Coast, created in 1952, and the Brecon Beacons (Bannau Brycheiniog), created in 1957, as well as five areas of outstanding natural beauty (AONB), which form some of the protected areas of Wales. One of the AONBs, the Clwydian Range and Dee Valley has been proposed to be replaced by a new national park, which would become Wales' fourth national park.

The three national park authorities work in partnership as 'National Parks Wales' (NPW) which promotes their purposes and interests. NPW identifies issues of joint interest and a way of agreeing outputs. Information and experiences are shared by NPW between various people concerned with the three National Parks.

Land within these areas remains largely in private ownership; these parks are not "national parks" as defined by the IUCN but they are areas of outstanding landscape where certain types of activity are slightly more restricted. National Parks are "national" as they are considered to be of special value to the whole nation.

The Environment Act 1995 notes that the National Parks of Wales have two purposes:

- To conserve and enhance the natural beauty, wildlife and cultural heritage of the National Parks; and
- To promote opportunities for the understanding and enjoyment of the special qualities (of the Park) by the public

== Administration ==
Following the Environment Act 1995, each national park has been managed by its own national park authority, a special purpose local authority, since April 1997.

Around half the members of each national park authority are appointees from the principal local authorities covered by the park; the remainder are appointed by the Senedd, some to represent the community councils, others selected to represent the "national interest". The National Park Authority is also the sole local planning authority for the park. Together the national parks are visited by an estimated 12 million people each year and almost three quarters of the population of Wales visit the Parks each year.

== The parks ==
=== Snowdonia (Eryri) ===
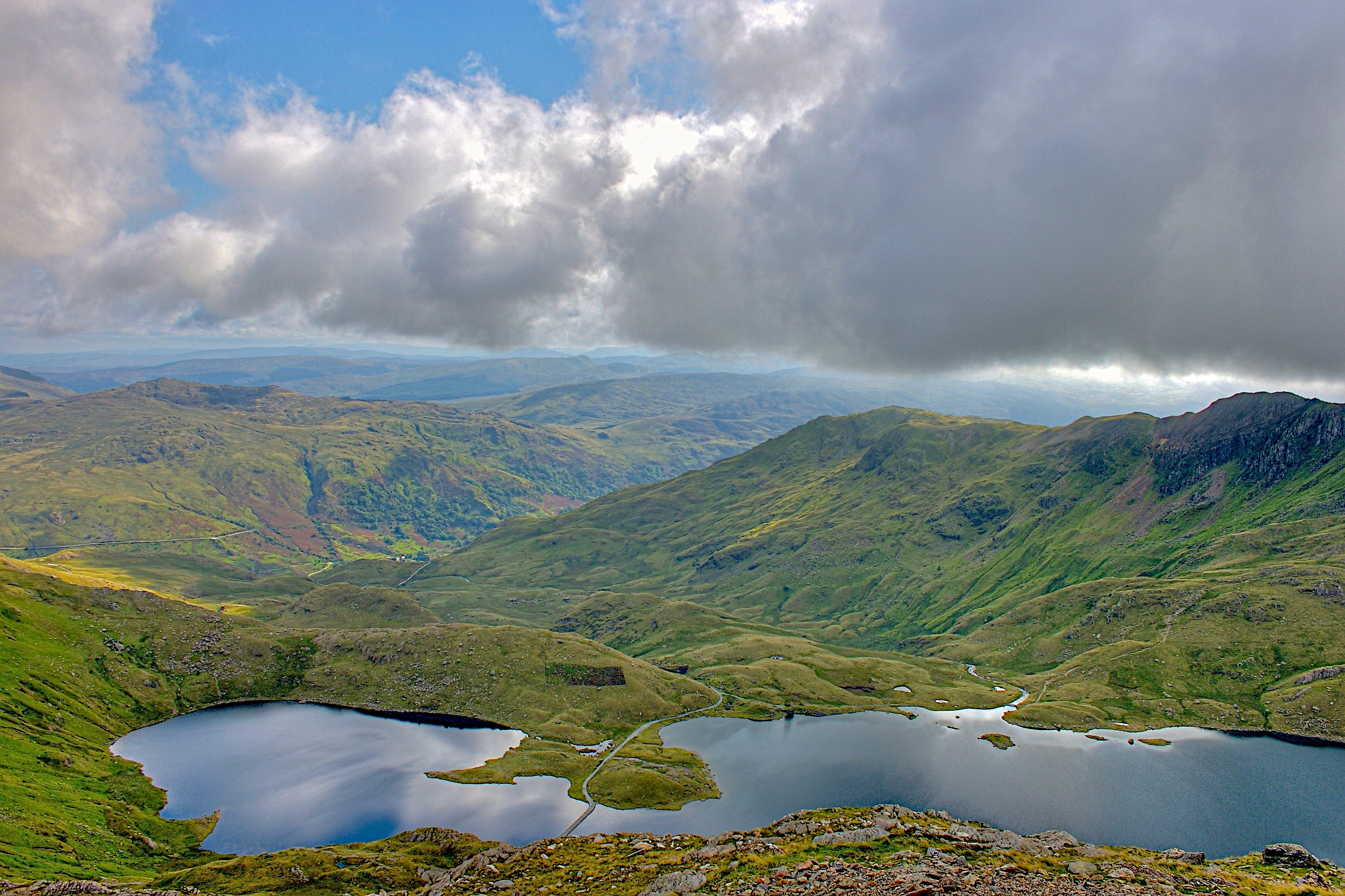

Formed in 1951, Snowdonia (Eryri) is the largest national park in Wales, and includes the highest mountain in Ireland, England and Wales, and Wales' largest natural lake. The area is steeped in culture and local history, where more than half its population speak Welsh. Fossil shell fragments on the summit of Snowdon date from over 500 million years ago and the ancient ‘Harlech Dome’ of which Snowdon and Cadair Idris form the northern and southern extents respectively, was created in the Cambrian Period before the volcanoes erupted. The more recent Ice Age glaciers were at their peak 18,000 years ago in Snowdonia and formed the distinctive U-shaped valleys including those at Llanberis and Nant Gwynant in the north and Tal-y-llyn Lake in the south.

The park is governed by the Eryri National Park Authority (Snowdonia National Park Authority), which is made up of local government and Welsh Government representatives. Its main offices are at Penrhyndeudraeth.

=== Pembrokeshire Coast ===
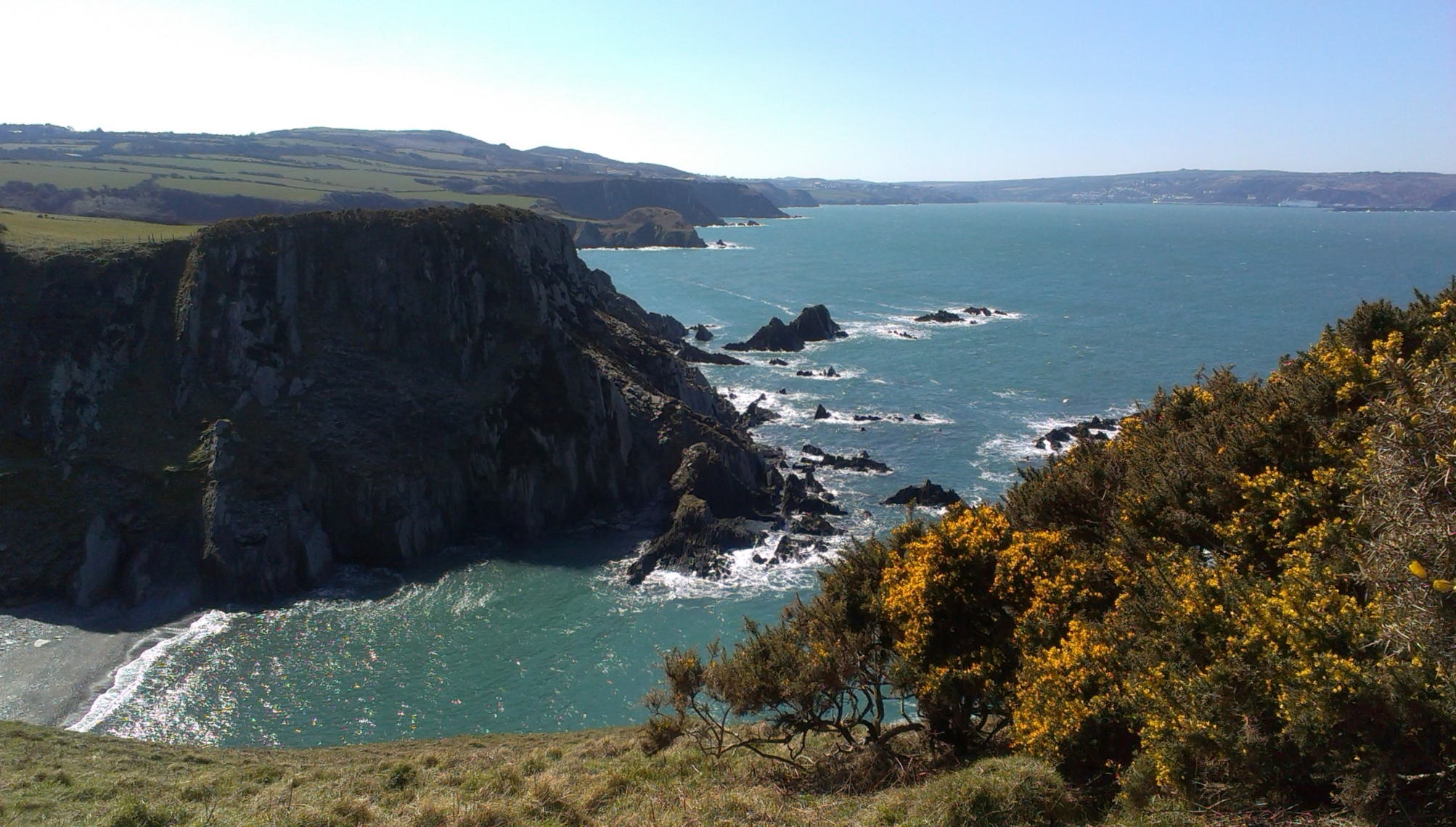

Formed in 1952, this is the only national park recognised primarily for its coastline; it covers almost all the Pembrokeshire Coast, every offshore island, the Daugleddau estuary and large areas of the Preseli Hills and the Gwaun Valley. It is an ecologically rich area recognised as of international importance for a wide range of high quality habitats and rare species. The park contains thirteen Special Areas of Conservation, five Special Protection Areas, one marine nature reserves and seven national nature reserves as well as sixty Sites of Special Scientific Interest. The park also contains a wealth of human history and culture, including the UK's smallest city, St Davids and Iron Age forts. Within the park there are also a total of sixty geological conservation sites ranging from small roadside quarries and isolated crags on hilltops to many kilometres of coastline.

The Park is managed by Pembrokeshire Coast National Park Authority, which has around 130 staff and a committee of 18 members. The Chief Executive is Tegryn Jones. The Authority also manages the entire length of the Pembrokeshire Coast Path, a 186-mile (299 km) national trail which lies almost entirely within the Pembrokeshire Coast National Park. More than 26,000 people live within the park. 58.6% of the population could speak Welsh in 2011.

=== Brecon Beacons (Bannau Brycheiniog) ===
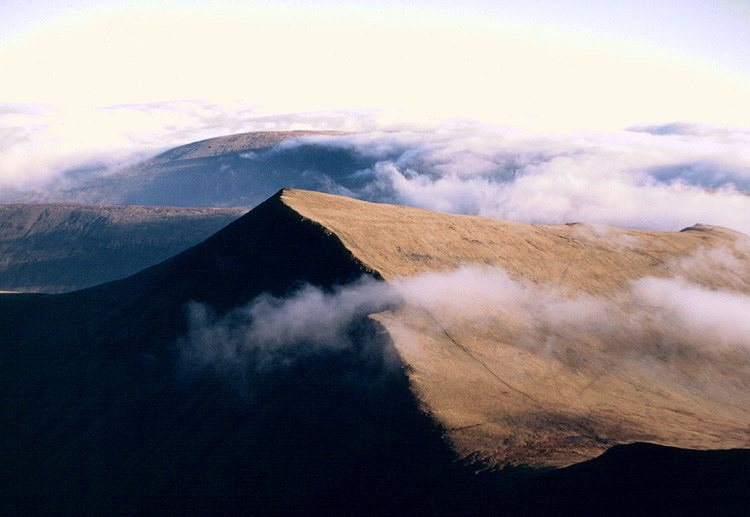

The last of the three national parks, formed in 1957 as the Brecon Beacons National Park and retitled to its Welsh name in 2023, the park straddles the divide between rural mid Wales and industrial South Wales. It stretches from Llandeilo in the west to Hay-on-Wye in the northeast and Pontypool in the southeast, covering 519 square miles (1,340 km^{2}) and encompassing four main regions – the Black Mountain in the west, Fforest Fawr and the Brecon Beacons in the centre, and the Black Mountains in the east, where the highest point is Waun Fach 811 metres (2,661 feet).

It is formed from sedimentary rocks from the mid Ordovician through to the late Carboniferous though it is the Devonian Old Red Sandstone which is the rock most identified with the park, since it forms the larger part of the different mountain massifs including South Wales' highest point Pen y Fan at 886m. Like many other upland national parks it is glacial activity during the Quaternary ice ages which is responsible for many of the well-known landforms. The west of the park is also designated as Fforest Fawr Geopark in recognition of its geological interest, and includes Waterfall Country. A number of former tramroads and the Monmouthshire and Brecon Canal running down the Usk valley dating from the Industrial Revolution now serve as recreational facilities.

The Bannau Brycheiniog National Park Authority (Brecon Beacons National Park Authority) is a special purpose local authority with wide-ranging responsibilities for the conservation and enhancement of the landscape and the promotion of its enjoyment by the public, and in particular exercises planning functions across the designated area of the park.

== List of national parks ==
Name	Photo	County/ies	Date formed	Area
Snowdonia (Eryri)		Gwynedd, Conwy; 52°54′N 3°51′W	18 October 1951	2,142 square kilometres (827.0 sq mi)
Pembrokeshire Coast (Welsh: Arfordir Penfro)		Pembrokeshire; 51°50′N 5°05′W	29 February 1952	620 square kilometres (239.4 sq mi)
Brecon Beacons (Bannau Brycheiniog)		Blaenau Gwent, Carmarthenshire, Merthyr Tydfil, Powys, Rhondda Cynon Taf, Monmouthshire, Torfaen, Caerphilly; 51°53′N 3°26′W	17 April 1957	1,351 square kilometres (521.6 sq mi)

In the 1990s, an independent panel chaired by Professor Ron Edwards from Cardiff University reviewed the operation of the Parks over a period of 40 years, which culminated in a report known as "the Edwards Report" and subsequent establishment of "free-standing, independent authorities" through the Environment Act 1995 and set up in 1996.

In 2004, the Welsh Government published an independent review of the National Parks and 3 years later produced a policy statement on National Parks and NPAs. In 2014, the 'Commission on Public Service Governance and Delivery' recommended that NPAs collaborated further with each other, with local authorities, with Natural Resources Wales etc., to share expertise, avoid duplication, and to maximise the use of resources.

== Proposed national parks ==
Two areas of Wales have been proposed by campaigners to become national parks:

- Glyndŵr National Park, replacing the Clwydian Range and Dee Valley AONB, has been proposed since 2010, with Welsh Labour supporting a new national park in north-east Wales in their manifesto for the 2021 Senedd election.
- Bids for the Cambrian Mountains to get national park status have been made since the 1960s, with their 1973 bid rejected by the Welsh Office. Campaigns for a Cambrian Mountains national park in Mid Wales still continue.

== National Parks Wales ==
The three national park authorities work in partnership as National Parks Wales (NPW) which promotes their purposes and interests. NPW identifies issues of joint interest and a way of agreeing outputs. Information and experiences are shared by NPW between all people concerned with the three National Parks.

In their The Review of Designated Landscapes in Wales (May 2015) they noted that:

The current model of involving both national and local interests, managed by an independent National Park Authorities (NPAs), has struck an appropriate balance between managing these tensions and delivering outcomes of benefit to the whole of Wales.

== Funding ==
The three NPAs receive 75% of their national funding from the Welsh Government, and 25% from a National Park levy. The Welsh Government compensates local authorities in terms of the levy for National Parks.

== See also ==
- National Landscapes in Wales
- National parks of the United Kingdom
- List of habitats of principal importance in Wales
- National parks of Scotland
- Biodiversity of Wales
- Natural Resources Wales
