= National Landscapes in Wales =

Designated area of countryside in Wales

National Landscapes in Wales From top-right clockwise; Clwydian Range and Dee Valley, Wye Valley (Note: partly in England, sections shaded in a lighter green.), Gower, Llŷn, and Anglesey.

There are five National Landscapes (Welsh: Tirweddau Cenedlaethol), formally Areas of Outstanding Natural Beauty (AONBs), (Note: The sole name prior to November 2023. AONBs are translated as Ardal(oedd) o Harddwch Naturiol Eithriadol; shortened to AHNE or AOHNE, in Welsh. (oedd) is the plural.) in Wales. AONBs are areas of countryside that have been designated for statutory protection, due to their significant landscape value, by initially the Government of the United Kingdom and later Welsh devolved bodies. Of the current five areas designated, four are wholly in Wales, with another spanning the Wales-England border, and in total AONBs account for 4% of Wales' land area.

The responsibility of designating areas in recognition of their national importance is devolved to Wales and performed by Natural Resources Wales (formerly the Countryside Council for Wales), on behalf of the Welsh Government. The designation is also used in England, and Northern Ireland. Areas of Outstanding Natural Beauty enjoy levels of protection from development similar to those of Welsh national parks, but unlike national parks, the responsible AONB bodies do not have their own planning powers, instead are performed by local authorities. They also differ from national parks in their more limited opportunities for extensive outdoor recreation. The Welsh Government had proposed that the designation be renamed to National Landscapes of Wales, however, they did not follow through with the proposals. In November 2023, all AONBs across England and Wales were to be renamed "National Landscapes".

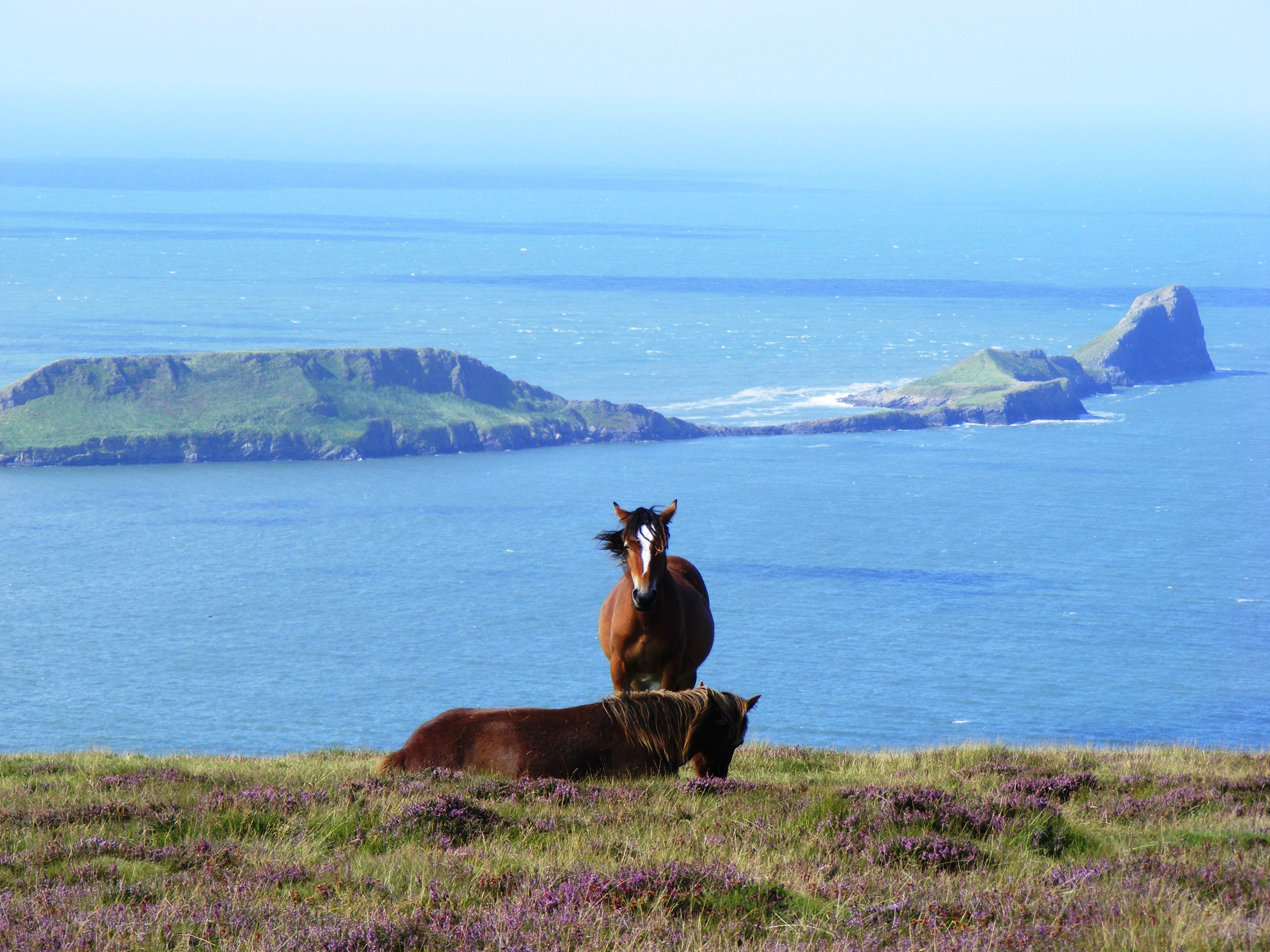
Horses on the Gower Peninsula, with the Worm's Head in the background.

Of the five, the Gower AONB was the first area to be designated in Wales in 1956, and the Clwydian Range and Dee Valley AONB is the most recent, designated as the Clwydian Range AONB in 1985, and expanded to the Dee Valley in 2011.

== History ==
The Hobhouse Report by Sir Arthur Hobhouse, published in July 1947 to the Ministry of Town and Country Planning, proposed 52 conservation areas in England and Wales, of which under the term "Western", eleven are wholly in Wales, and a further three are situated around the Wales-England border. These areas were selected for their "outstanding landscape beauty" and home to "great scientific interest", which was deemed worthy of protection and management through statutory designation. The Hobhouse Report alongside the 1945 Report to the Government on National Parks in England and Wales by John Gordon Dower, would contribute to the National Parks and Access to the Countryside Act 1949 which created the National Parks and set up the designation later to become "Areas of Outstanding Natural Beauty".

Conservation areas proposed in the 1947 Hobhouse Report; with their proposed size; likely to be wholly in Wales:

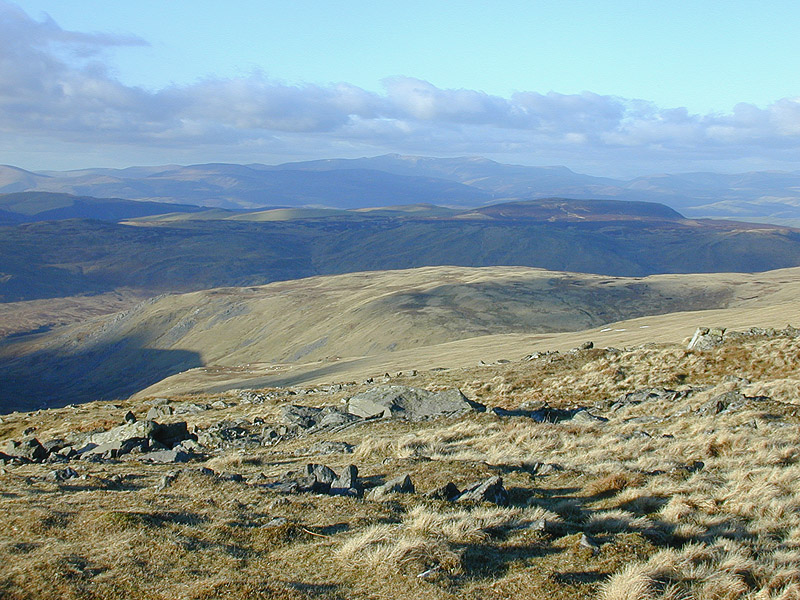
Pen Pumlumon Arwystli in the proposed Cambrian Mountains

- Anglesey Coast — 76 sq mi (200 km^{2}) (in comparison the Anglesey AONB; spans 85 sq mi (220 km^{2}))
- Lleyn Coast — 34 sq mi (88 km^{2}) (in comparison the Llŷn AONB; spans 60 sq mi (160 km^{2}))
- Denbigh Moors — 146 sq mi (380 km^{2})
- Clwydian Range — 120 sq mi (310 km^{2}) (in comparison the Clwydian Range AONB; spanned 61 sq mi (160 km^{2}) between 1985-2011)
- Berwyn — 205 sq mi (530 km^{2})
- Plynlimon — 520 sq mi (1,300 km^{2})
- Elenith Mountains — 484 sq mi (1,250 km^{2})
- Epynt — 179 sq mi (460 km^{2})
- Cardigan Coast — 18 sq mi (47 km^{2})
- Gower — 48 sq mi (120 km^{2}) (in comparison the Gower AONB; spans 73 sq mi (190 km^{2}))
- South Glamorgan Coast — 14 sq mi (36 km^{2})

Conservation areas proposed in the 1947 Hobhouse Report; with their proposed size; but extent into Wales unknown, may be only in England or extend into Wales:

- Clun and Radnor Forests — 474 sq mi (1,230 km^{2}) (England & Wales)^{*}
- Shropshire Hills — 192 sq mi (500 km^{2}) (existing Shropshire Hills AONB stops at England-Wales border, may have been proposed as cross border; existing AONB spans 310 sq mi (800 km^{2}))
- Forest of Dean and Wye Valley — 232 sq mi (600 km^{2}) (existing Wye Valley AONB crosses the England-Wales border; spanning 126 sq mi (330 km^{2}) in both countries) (Forest of Dean was not designated as AONB at the time, and if designated separately would be wholly in England)

^{*} May be wholly in Wales or extend further through the Clun Forest into England.

=== Designation of the AONBs ===
AONBs were first designated under the National Parks and Access to the Countryside Act 1949, and prior to devolution, were designated on behalf of the UK Government.

The first AONB to be designated with the status in Wales was the Gower AONB in 1956, designated for its classic limestone coast and local natural habitats, it was also the first AONB designated in the UK. This was followed by parts of the Llŷn Peninsula to be designated an AONB in 1957, with 55 miles (89 km) of the AONB's coastline also designated as a Heritage coast. The coasts of Anglesey were designated as an AONB in 1966, with its status confirmed the following year, the status was awarded to the Anglesey Coast to protect its aesthetic appeal and the various landscapes and habitats from inappropriate development. The Wye Valley, spanning parts of both Wales and England, was designated in 1971, to protect the AONBs various features including: limestone gorges, native woodlands, hillforts, castles and the first Cistercian Abbey in Wales. The Clwydian Range was designated as an Area of Outstanding Natural Beauty in 1985 by the Secretary of State for Wales Nicholas Edwards MP; with proposals to extend it to the Dee Valley by the Countryside Council for Wales and local councils announced in 2010, and approved in November 2011 expanding the AONB to become the current Clwydian Range and Dee Valley.

=== 2015 review ===
In 2014, Carl Sargeant AM, then Minister for Natural Resources, commissioned for a Review of the Designated Landscapes in Wales, to "ensure that [Wales'] designated landscapes are best equipped to meet current and future challenges while building upon their internationally recognised status".

In July 2015, the Welsh Government commissioned review paper, produced by an independent panel chaired by Professor Terry Marsden of Cardiff University ("Marsden review") was published, providing 69 recommendations

The initial report called for grouping the AONBs with National Parks as "The National Designated Landscapes of Wales", but opposed any plans to make AONBs and National Parks a single designation, and instead, both designations are "the equivalent designations" with identical Statutory Purposes and Duties, with a further initial recommendation for renaming AONBs to "National Landscapes".

The review detailed three "statutory purposes":

- Conservation — "To conserve and enhance the distinctive landscape (Note: the review defines "landscape" to include the "natural environment", biodiversity, human settlements, and local culture.) and seascape qualities of the area"
- Human Well-being — "To promote physical and mental well-being through the enjoyment and understanding of the landscape of the area"
- Sustainable Resource Management — "To promote sustainable forms of natural resource management and economic and community development which support the cultural heritage of the area"

and recommended a reclarified Statutory Duty, replacing the current "have regard to" duty in existing public bodies, to be replaced with a "single and clear duty" — "To contribute to the delivery of the three Purposes of the National Designated Landscapes". The Sandford Principle was also recommended to be retained in the review, which confirms the primacy of conservation in the AONBs should conflict with other duties arise.

It also proposed that AONBs should become statutory consultees on planning applications that are considered to have an impact on the "special qualities" of the AONBs. The authors of the report recommended that the management bodies of the AONBs and national parks should maintain their purposes, in conserving the landscape, promoting physical well-being, and promoting sustainable economic and community development. But the report states that the bodies have to improve their understanding of the local economy, in particular the tourism sector.

Lesley Griffiths AM, then Cabinet Secretary for Environment and Rural Affairs, would describe the crux of the report to be the promotion of the authorities' duty to consider the socio-economic well-being of the AONBs.

The Marsden review also recommended that the Welsh Government empower AONBs and national parks to become centres of innovation and a catalyst for development for regions of rural Wales, but within the designated landscapes' "environmental limits", and to set performance targets for the managing bodies of the designated landscapes.

Other recommendations in the report include: extending AONB boundaries to cover adjacent sea areas, reducing the regulatory burden of audit, creation of bodies (including a National Landscape Committee, National Partnership Board and Local Partnerships), the introduction of a Partnership Plan for each area, remove the political balance requirement on AONB boards (revised to have local authority, national and “local” appointees allocated proportionally), and finally provide a core grant from Welsh Government for all designated landscape areas (whilst increasing scrutiny and diversity of their overall revenue budget through pan-Wales strategy using indicators and targets).

A final report of the Review of Designated Landscapes in Wales was published in November 2015. The report's new recommendations include; no change of name (as mentioned below) or legal status of AONBs or national parks in Wales, strengthening the supporting and delivery role of other bodies, and creating a National Landscape Committee.

In March 2018, Hannah Blythyn AM, then Minister for Environment, stated no changes were to be made on how AONBs operate in Wales, including the proposed name change.

==== Proposed renaming ====
The initial Marsden review proposed that Wales' five AONBs be renamed to the "National Landscapes of Wales".

The proposals met criticism from AMs, MPs, volunteer groups, and tourist trade organisations, with South Wales West AM Peter Black describing the move to be "misguided" and "should be ignored". Black also questioned how redesignating would work on the Wye Valley AONB, shared with England where renaming may not be applied. With opposition from Gower (home to Wales' first AONB) being increasingly vocal in their opposition. Critics describe the re-branding to be a potential turn off for tourism to the areas, and describe the AONB naming to have years of brand integrity. A Welsh Government spokesperson said that any renaming of the areas would be subject to a full public consultation. Supporters of renaming describe the term "AONB" to be "unusual" due to it being overly descriptive and emotive. Other supporters support the rename to include "Wales" in the title to provide some distinction to Wales' areas over AONBs remaining in England and Northern Ireland. The renaming was also proposed for AONBs elsewhere in the United Kingdom, and followed through by the Cotswolds AONB which rebranded itself to the Cotswolds National Landscape in 2020. In November 2023, all AONBs across England and Wales were to be renamed "National Landscapes".

A later published finalised review by Marsden removed the recommendation for renaming AONBs, recommending instead that "The Welsh Government should retain the names of National Parks and Areas of Outstanding Natural Beauty (AONBs) as the key designations of the National Landscapes of Wales". With the existing designations being within a consistent and resilient nomenclature, coined in the report to potentially be "The National Landscapes of Wales", reaffirming as initially recommended, that both AONBs and National Parks be "The Equivalent Designations" within this one group.

=== 2017 review ===
In 2015, Carl Sargeant AM, then Minister for Natural Resources, set up a Future Landscape Working Group, chaired by Dafydd Elis-Thomas AM for Dwyfor Meirionnydd, and aimed to explore the recommendations from the Marsden review and report findings in 2016. The group included representatives from the AONBs, National Parks, various environmental groups, and business and government officials.

The "Future Landscapes" review was published in May 2017. It set out a new plan for AONBs and National Parks, advocating that they should go beyond their current duties for improving conservation and amenities, by becoming "drivers" of sustainable natural resource management (as set out in Welsh legislation), provide a benefit for the wider public and private within and beyond their designated areas, realising the economic potential of local communities, promote green growth and ecosystem resilience. For governance of the areas, the review recommended that bodies and partnerships of the AONBs work across their boundaries together with Natural Resources Wales and local partnerships to promote the social, cultural, and economic value of the areas, and improve sustainable usage of the areas. Following publication, Lesley Griffiths, then Cabinet Secretary for Environment and Rural Affairs, thanked the group for their work, and stated that "the next step is to deliver against the ambition, not in isolation, but together as part of the collaborative approach".

Critics of the report state that, it fails to mention the "Sandford Principle" which was a key recommendation in the Marsden review. The principle means that whenever there is a conflict between recreation in designated landscapes and the authorities' duty for the conservation of the area, conservation takes priority over recreation. Some AMs have voiced their fears that the report can lead to legislation that removes the extra protections awarded to designated landscapes, and could allow developments, in particular, focused on green infrastructure such as wind farms, to be built within the protected areas. Which critics describe would "detract from the purpose" of the areas' designated status. The Snowdonia Society, stated the report lacked clarity and echoed the concerns that the report lacked an emphasis on the primacy of conservation, noting that the word "Conservation" was absent in the Future Landscapes document.

In 2017, the International Union for Conservation of Nature (IUCN) World Commission on Protected Areas' UK Assessment Panel, expressed concerns over the Future Landscapes report commissioned by the Welsh Government. The panel stated that the new report diluted the importance of conservation in the designated landscapes as recommended in the Marsden review, and stylises the landscapes as "catalysts for regional development in rural areas", rather than from an environmental point of view. The panel concluded, that if the report's recommendations are acted upon, it would be "impossible for the panel to continue to accord international recognition to Wales’s national parks and AONBs as protected areas", and that Wales' National Parks and AONBs would be less protected and weaker than those designated in the rest of the United Kingdom.

In March 2018, Minister for Environment Hannah Blythyn AM stated no changes were to be made on how AONBs operate in Wales.

=== Re-naming ===
On 22 November 2023, it was announced all AONBs in England and Wales would be renamed to "National Landscapes".

== Management ==
Powers for the designation and management of AONBs are devolved to Wales, under the Countryside and Rights of Way Act 2000 (CRoW Act). Under Section 82 of the CRoW Act, Natural Resources Wales (NRW) holds the right to designate any area of Wales, that is deemed to be of "outstanding natural beauty" worthy of conservation and enhancement that is not within a National Park, to be an AONB, following approval from the Welsh Government. NRW advises the government on any areas it deems suitable for AONB status, awards partnership funding to AONBs, and advises planning and development that may have an impact on the AONB.

Each AONB has a dedicated AONB officer, other staff, and alongside the other AONBs in England and Wales are collectively represented by the "National Landscapes Association", previously the "National Association for Areas of Outstanding Natural Beauty" (NAAONB).

AONBs are classified as a Category V landscape by the International Union for Conservation of Nature (IUCN).

Natural Resources Wales (NRW) has overall responsibility for AONBs nationally in Wales but the AONBs are locally managed by local authorities with the support of Joint Advisory Committees (JAC), local communities and partnerships.

Under the Countryside and Rights of Way Act 2000, local authorities are responsible for developing an AONB management plan. This plan is constructed in consultation with the advisory committees and an AONB partnership–which reports and advises the local authorities–in the development and completion of the AONB Management Plan. The management plan sets out the policies the local authorities want to enact for the management of the AONB and how these policies would be implemented and achieved, providing a framework of permitted activities in the AONB. The management plan is required to take into consideration various issues of the AONB and not be limited to only environmental priorities, but also to analyse and address social and economic issues in the AONB. The 2000 act mandates that management plans have to be revised no less than every five years, with Natural Resources Wales (formed from a merger including the Countryside Council for Wales in 2013) providing funding for AONB management to the local authorities, allocated based on the AONB's management plan's policies. Local authorities or joint committees are required to notify NRW when they are intending to publish their management plan. The same act places a duty on public bodies; including private utility companies to respect efforts made to conserve, protect, and enhance the AONB's natural beauty.

The AONB designation shares the same status in terms of planning with national parks, however, unlike national parks, AONB's cannot undertake their own planning operations. Instead, the powers are awarded to the relevant planning authorities of the local unitary authorities on behalf of the AONB.

== List of areas ==
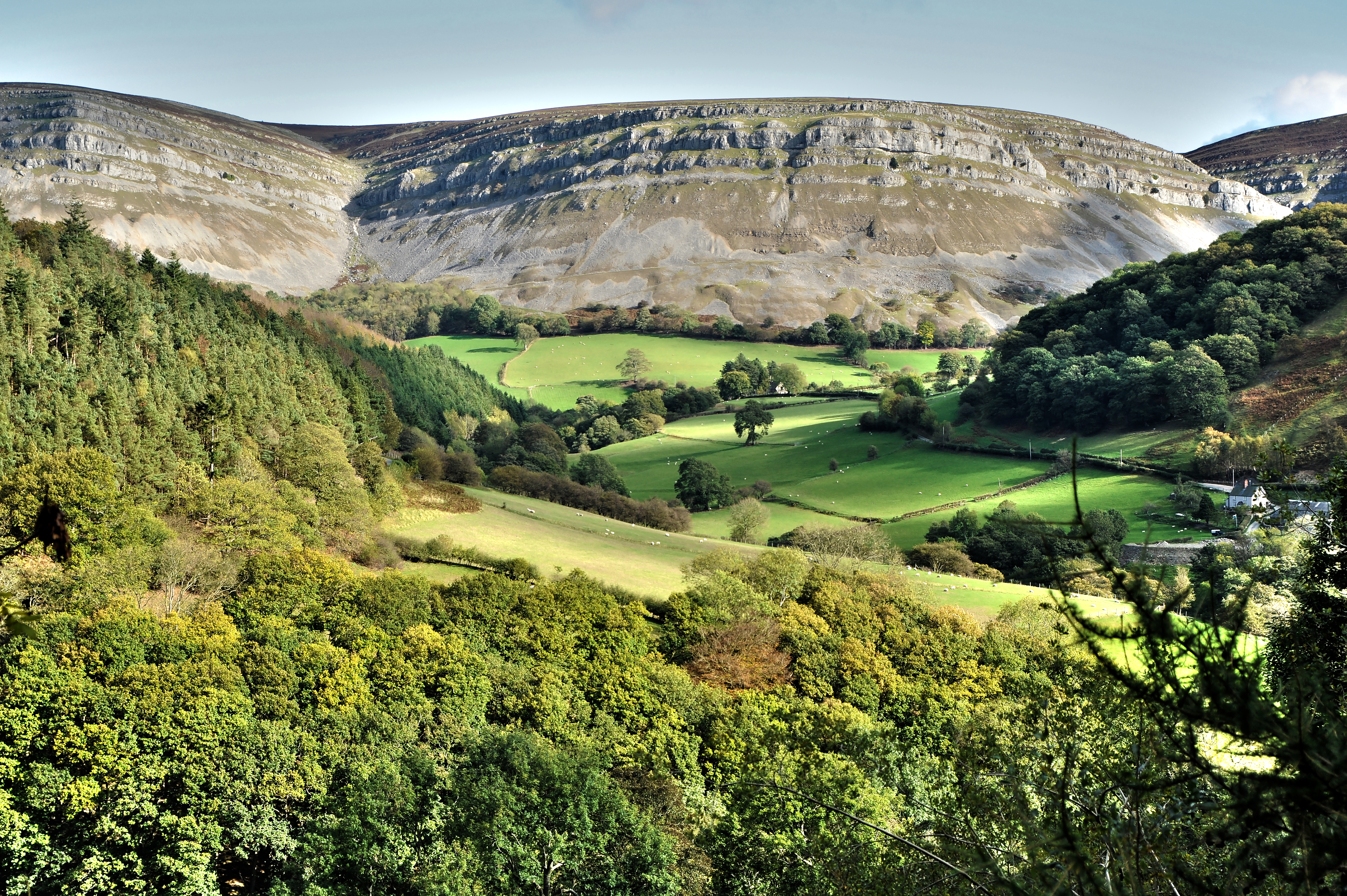
Eglwyseg Valley, in the Clwydian Range and Dee Valley AONB.

Five National Landscapes, or Areas of Outstanding Natural Beauty (AONB), have been designated in Wales, one of which, the Wye Valley National Landscape, straddles the Anglo-Welsh border. The areas are:

- Gower National Landscape (Welsh: Tirwedd Cenedlaethol Gŵyr) – which spans 188 km^{2} (73 square miles) of the Gower peninsula. The AONB covers almost the entire peninsula (excluding some eastern urban areas), and is located within the City and County of Swansea on the south-west coast of Wales, on the north side of the Bristol Channel. Referred to colloquially as "the Gower", it was the first area in the United Kingdom to be designated as an AONB in 1956.
- Llŷn AONB (Welsh: AHNE Llŷn) – which spans 155 km^{2} (60 square miles) or around a quarter of the Llŷn Peninsula, covering much of the coastline and the ex-volcanic hills. The peninsula extends 48 km (30 miles) into the Irish Sea from mainland north-west Wales, and south-west of the Isle of Anglesey. The AONB was created in 1956, and is one of the most scientifically important in both Wales and the United Kingdom. 55 miles (89 km) of the AONB's coastline is Heritage coast.
- Anglesey AONB (Welsh: AHNE Ynys Môn) – which was designated as a AONB in 1966, in order to protect the aesthetic appeal and variety of the island's coastal landscape and habitats from inappropriate development. The AONB covers most of Anglesey's 125 miles (201 km) coastline, as well as inland areas, such as Holyhead Mountain and Mynydd Bodafon. The AONB covers around 221 square kilometres (85 sq mi), about a third of the county, making it Wales' second-largest AONB, and largest until 2011.
- Wye Valley National Landscape (Welsh: Tirwedd Cenedlaethol Dyffryn Gwy) – which was designated in 1971, is an internationally important protected landscape straddling the border between England and Wales, with the Welsh section wholly within Monmouthshire. It is one of the most dramatic and scenic landscape areas in Southern Britain. The River Wye (Welsh: Afon Gwy) is the fifth-longest river in the United Kingdom. The upper part of the river passes through the settlements of Rhayader, Builth Wells and Hay-on-Wye, but the area designated as an AONB surrounds only the 58-mile stretch lower down the river, from just south of the English city of Hereford to Chepstow in Wales.
- Clwydian Range and Dee Valley National Landscape (Welsh: Tirwedd Cenedlaethol Bryniau Clwyd a Dyffryn Dyfrdwy) – is the largest National Landscape (AONB) in Wales, located in the country's north-east, in Denbighshire, Flintshire and Wrexham. First designated in 1985 to cover only the Clwydian Range, a series of hills running from Prestatyn to Llandegla. The AONB was expanded to areas around the River Dee and Vale of Llangollen in 2011, including the Eglwyseg escarpment and Llantysilio Mountain. The highest point in the AONB is Moel Fferna in the Berwyns at 630 m (2,070 ft), but the most popular summit, and prior to 2011 the highest peak, is Moel Famau in the Clwydian Range at 554 m (1,818 ft). The AONB is 389 square kilometres (150 sq mi) in land area, increasing from 158 km^{2} (61 sq mi) before 2011, and it is also a proposed national park.

Table of Areas of Outstanding Natural Beauty in Wales
AONB / AHNE	Photo	Established	Area	Local authorities	Map
Anglesey (Ynys Môn)		1967	221 km^{2} (85 sq mi)	Anglesey	
Clwydian Range and Dee Valley (Note: Proposed to become a national park.) (Bryniau Clwyd a Dyffryn Dyfrdwy)		1985	389 km^{2} (150 sq mi)	Denbighshire, Flintshire, Wrexham	
Gower (Gŵyr)		1956	188 km^{2} (73 sq mi)	Swansea	
Llŷn		1957	155 km^{2} (60 sq mi)	Gwynedd	
Wye Valley (Dyffryn Gwy) (partly in England)		1971	326 km^{2} (126 sq mi)	Monmouthshire, England: Gloucestershire, Herefordshire	

=== Proposed areas ===
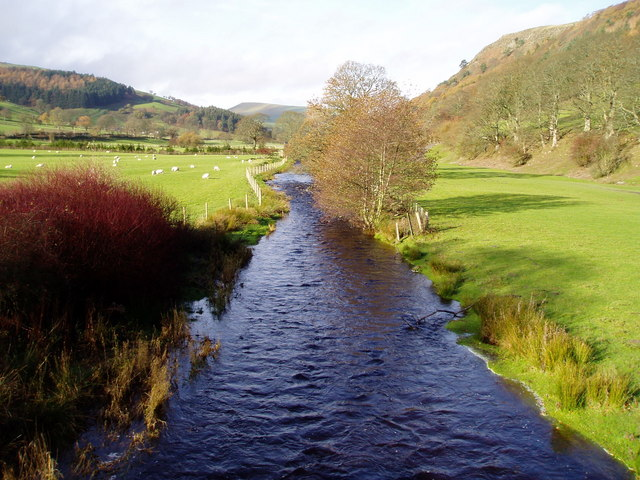
River Ceiriog, in the proposed Ceiriog Valley, from the bridge at Llanarmon Dyffryn Ceiriog.

- Cambrian Mountains — launched in November 2006, the campaign by Cambrian Mountains Society to make the area an AONB, campaign on the basis that AONB status would "boost the local economy, and help agriculture, heritage and culture". The area's bid to become a national park has been in the works since the 1960s, reaching the Welsh Office in 1973, where it was ultimately rejected. The campaign continues to propose that the area should become a national park, advocating for any type of environmental protection for the area. Welsh ministers expressed openness to the idea in 2023, however progress on the bid would be delayed to 2026 as ministers focus on a Clwydian Range and Dee Valley national park.
- Ceiriog Valley and Y Berwyn — The Countryside Council for Wales (CCW) started the consideration of the area into an AONB in February 2011 alongside proposals for the then Clwydian Range AONB. A final report published in March 2012, concluded that AONB status for Y Berwyn (which includes the Ceiriog Valley) is "desirable for the statutory purpose of conserving and enhancing the area’s natural beauty", but further work is to be done by the CCW to investigate alternatives to AONB status before a final decision is to be made.
- Expansion of the Gower AONB — first proposed in 2005, the Gower Society calls for an extension of the Gower AONB, and submitted a proposal to the National Assembly for Wales in March 2012. The Gower Society have also proposed for the AONB to become a national park, however such proposals have not been acted on by the Welsh Assembly Government.
- Gwent Levels — In July 2019, John Griffiths AM for Newport East called for the area to be awarded AONB status following the scrapping of the proposed M4 relief road, which if followed through would've passed through the proposed area. Griffiths states that AONB status would protect the area from similar proposals. The Gwent branch of the Wales Green Party sponsored a petition to make the area an AONB.
- Towy Valley (Tywi Valley) – In April 2023, the Carmarthenshire Residents Action Group launched a campaign for the Towy Valley to become an AONB to protect the area from "harmful developments", with proposed electricity pylons used as an example.
- Mid Wales – In April 2023, a petition was launched for a Mid Wales AONB covering the Upper Wye Valley and the water catchment areas of at least the rivers Irfon, Ithon and Elan.

=== Rating ===
In November 2021, a Which? review listed Gower as the top-rated AONB in Wales (10th in the UK); followed by Wye Valley (15th), Llŷn (20th), Clwydian Range and Dee Valley (21st), and Anglesey (26th).

== See also ==
- National parks in Wales
- Areas of Outstanding Natural Beauty in England
- Areas of Outstanding Natural Beauty in Northern Ireland
- National scenic area (Scotland)
