= Gronant Dunes and Talacre Warren =

Protected area in Clwyd, Wales

- Site of Special Scientific Interest
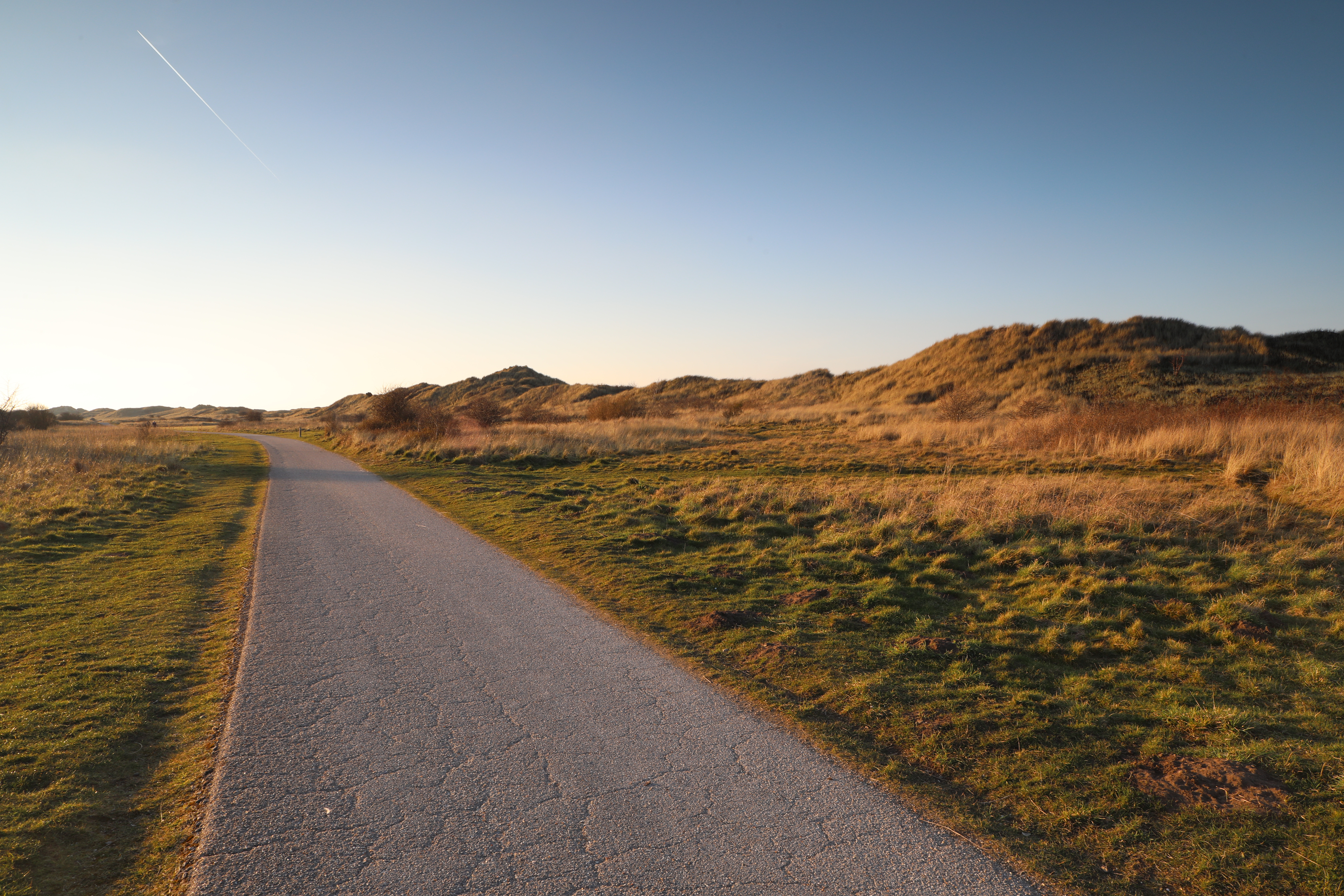
- Track in the Warren

- Location within Wales
- Location of Gronant Dunes and Talacre Warren.
- Area of search: Clwyd
- Coordinates: 53.352°N 3.357°W
- Area: 518.8 hectares (1,282 acres)
- Notification date: 1971, 1983, 1998

Gronant Dunes and Talacre Warren is a Site of Special Scientific Interest, along the north Wales coast.

The Gronant Dunes form an area of sand dunes along the Denbighshire coast, between Prestatyn and Gronant. The dunes continue further eastwards from the Prestatyn Gutter (which cuts the dune system into two) towards the Point of Ayr in Flintshire, as the Talacre Dunes.

Talacre Warren is formed of two dune ridges, with the area along the coast between Talacre and Gronant known as simply "the Warren". While Talacre Beach is the beach along the North Wales Coast.

The Warren, and the adjacent Talacre Beach, were home to holiday chalets in the early 1930s. During World War II, the area housed evacuees that fled Merseyside docks and shipyards due to bombing raids, such as the Blitz during 1941. The influx led to a camp of makeshift huts and various other shelters being created, many lacking basic facilities such as running water and electricity. After the war, some chalets became permanent family homes for those sheltered, while the area received increasing tourism. However, by the late 1950s the camp's condition and lack of facilities, led to media and comedians labelling it a "shanty town", warning holidaymakers of a "slum by the sea" and the sanitary conditions of its beach. The labelling upset locals with a councillor of Llanasa Parish Council objecting to the term in 1964. The Morfa Holiday Camp, later Talacre Beach Resort opened in the 1960s.

The SSSI is located between Prestatyn and Talacre. It has been designated because of its plant life, insects and birds, and its dune system a home for natterjack toads and Wales' only breeding little tern colony. The dunes in the SSSI are also part of the Dee Estuary Special Area of Conservation.

The Gronant Dunes are the last remnants of a wider dune system that spanned across North East Wales, from Rhyl to the Point of Ayr. Most of the other former dunes were replaced with sea walls, as industry, tourism and human settlement increased along the coast, with these remaining sections utilising them for a natural sea defence.

The dunes support plant life, such as the rare sea holly, dune fescue, sea spurge, and pyramidal orchid, as well as marram grass. While its rare animals include the brown hare, mining bee, sandhill rustic moth and the skylark. Natterjack toads, and later sand lizards between 2003 and 2006, have been reintroduced, with the sand lizards formerly indigenous to the coast but were driven out due to past human activity in the area.

== See also ==
- List of Sites of Special Scientific Interest in Clwyd
