= Protected areas of Wales =

Designated area for protection in Wales

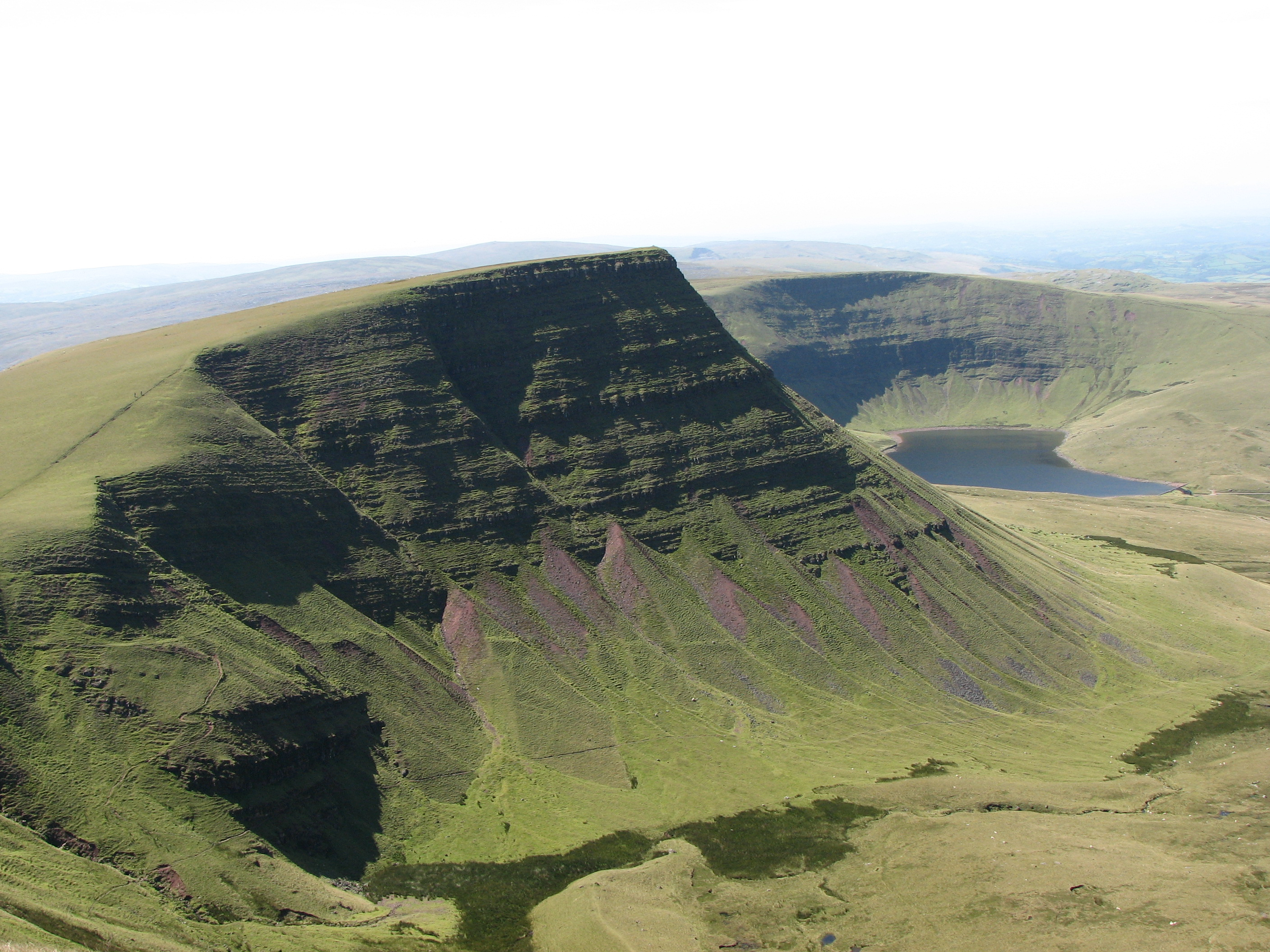
Llyn y Fan Fach in the Brecon Beacons, one of Wales's three national parks

National parks (left) and National Landscapes (right) in Wales, some of the country's protected areas.

Wales, a country that is part of the United Kingdom, contains protected areas under various designations. The largest designation by land area is Wales's three national parks, followed by the five National Landscapes (Area of Outstanding Natural Beauty), with both sometimes collectively described as the "Designated Landscapes of Wales".

Among these protected areas is Snowdonia (Eryri), Wales's first and the UK's third designated national park, and the Gower AONB covering parts of the Gower Peninsula being both Wales's and the UK's first Area of Outstanding Natural Beauty (AONB), as well as smaller designations.

== National parks ==
Wales is home to three national parks.

Snowdonia National Park (officially Eryri National Park, Welsh: Parc Cenedlaethol Eryri) – was established in 1951 as the third national park in the UK, following the Peak District and the Lake District. It covers 827 square miles (2,140 km^{2}), and has 37 miles (60 km) of coastline.

Pembrokeshire Coast National Park (Parc Cenedlaethol Arfordir Penfro) – is a national park along the Pembrokeshire coast in West Wales. It was established as a National Park in 1952, and is the only one in the United Kingdom to have been designated primarily because of its spectacular coastline. It covers an area of 629 square kilometres (243 sq mi).

Brecon Beacons National Park (officially Bannau Brycheiniog National Park, Welsh: Parc Cenedlaethol Bannau Brycheiniog) – founded in 1957, stretching from Llandeilo in the west to Hay-on-Wye in the east, covering 1,344 square kilometres (519 sq mi) and encompassing four main regions – the Black Mountain in the west, Fforest Fawr and the Brecon Beacons in the centre, and the Black Mountains in the east.

== National Landscapes ==
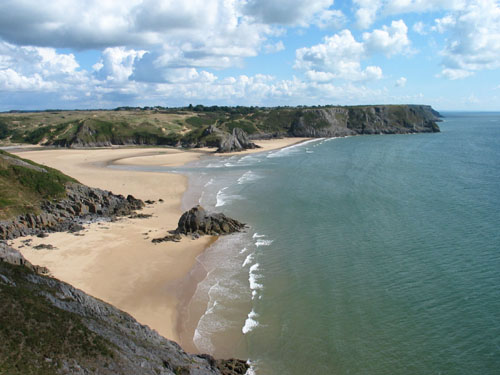
Three Cliffs Bay and Tor Bay on the Gower Peninsula, the first Area of Outstanding Natural Beauty to be designated in the United Kingdom

Five Areas of Outstanding Natural Beauty (AONB), branded as "National Landscapes", have been designated in Wales, one of which, the Wye Valley AONB, straddles the Anglo-Welsh border.

The Gower (Penrhyn Gŵyr) is a peninsula on the south west coast of Wales, on the north side of the Bristol Channel in the southwest of the historic county of Glamorgan. Referred to colloquially as 'the Gower', this was the first area in the United Kingdom to be designated as an AONB, in 1956, and covers 188 square kilometres (73 sq mi).

Llŷn (Penrhyn Llŷn or Pen Llŷn) is a peninsula which extends 30 miles (48 km) into the Irish Sea from north west Wales, south west of the Isle of Anglesey. Much of the coastline and the ex-volcanic hills are part of the Llŷn AONB, confirming the peninsula as one of the most scientifically important in both Wales and Britain. The AONB was created in 1956, and covers 155 square kilometres (60 sq mi).

Anglesey (Ynys Môn) was designated an AONB in 1966, in order to protect the aesthetic appeal and variety of the island's coastal landscape and habitats from inappropriate development. The AONB covers most of Anglesey's 125 miles (201 km) coastline, as well as inland areas, such as Holyhead Mountain and Mynydd Bodafon. The AONB covers around 221 square kilometres (85 sq mi), about a third of the county, making it Wales' largest AONB.

The Wye Valley National Landscape (Tirwedd Cenedlaethol Dyffryn Gwy), designated in 1971, is an internationally important protected landscape straddling the border between England and Wales. It is one of the most dramatic and scenic landscape areas in southern Britain. The River Wye (Afon Gwy) is the fifth-longest river in the United Kingdom. The upper part of the river passes through the settlements of Rhayader, Builth Wells and Hay-on-Wye, but the area designated as an AONB surrounds only the 58-mile stretch lower down the river, from just south of the city of Hereford to Chepstow.

The Clwydian Range and Dee Valley (Bryniau Clwyd a Dyffryn Dyfrdwy) is a series of hills and mountains in north east Wales that runs from Llandegla in the south to Prestatyn in the north, with the highest point of the Clwydian Range being the popular Moel Famau. It was designated as an AONB in 1985. The Clwydian Range AONB was extended in 2011 to include the hills around Llangollen, including the Eglwyseg escarpment and Llantysilio Mountain, and is 389 square kilometres (150 sq mi) in extent.

== Heritage Coast ==
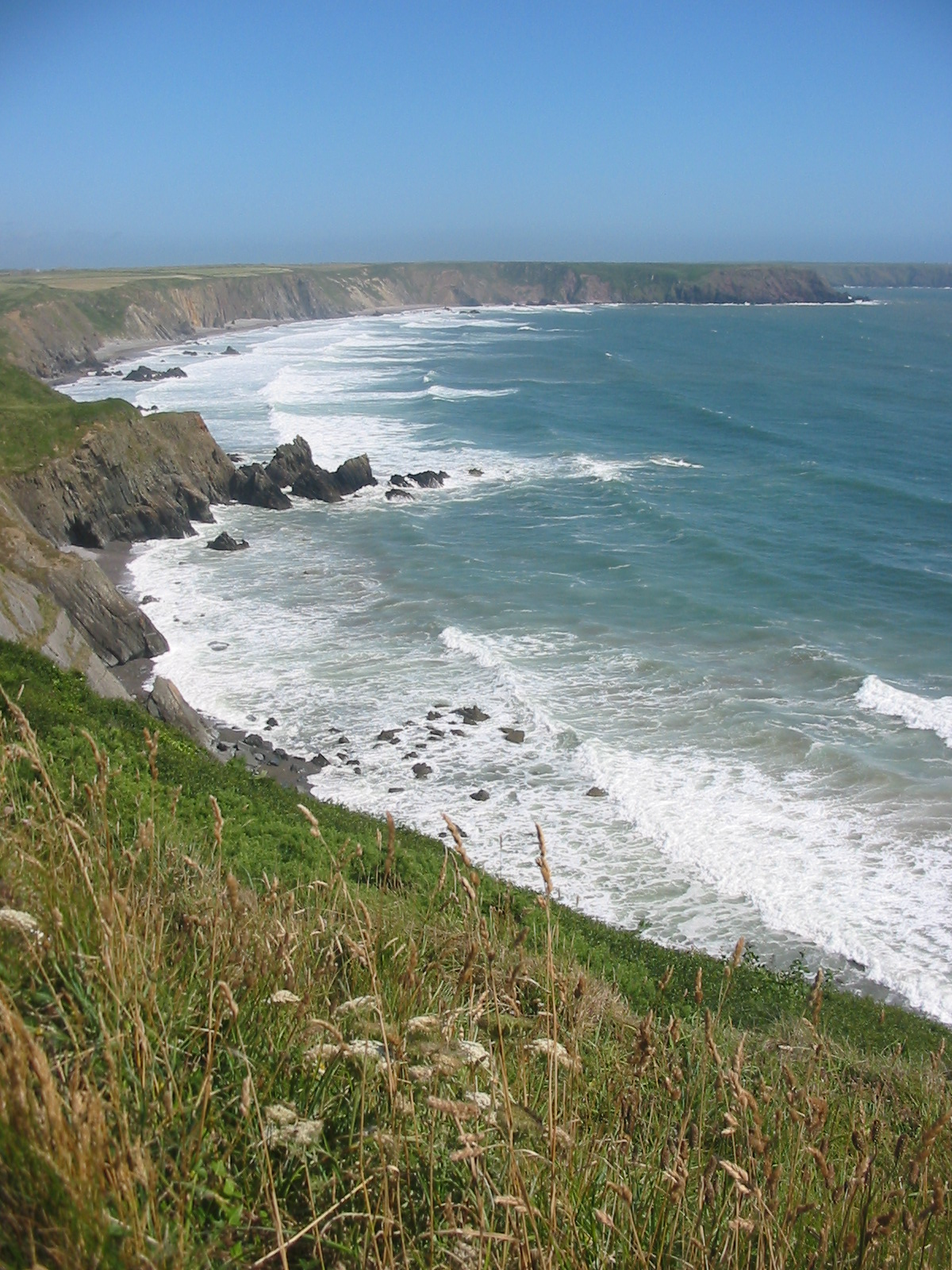
Marloes Peninsula Heritage Coast, seen from the Pembrokeshire Coast Path

There are fourteen heritage coasts in Wales. They are "stretches of outstanding, undeveloped coast in England and Wales", which are not protected by law (except where covered by other protected areas), but are given special consideration by planning authorities. They are:

- Glamorgan Heritage Coast – 22.5 kilometres (14.0 mi)
- Great Orme Heritage Coast
- Gower Heritage Coast
- North Anglesey Heritage Coast – 28.6 kilometres (17.8 mi)
- Holyhead Mountain Anglesey Heritage Coast – 12.9 kilometres (8.0 mi)
- Aberffraw Bay Anglesey Heritage Coast – 7.7 kilometres (4.8 mi)
- Llŷn Heritage Coast
- South Pembrokeshire Heritage Coast
- Marloes and Dale Pembrokeshire Heritage Coast
- St Brides Bay Pembrokeshire Heritage Coast
- St Davids Peninsula Pembrokeshire Heritage Coast
- Dinas Head Pembrokeshire Heritage Coast
- St Dogmaels & Molygrove Pembrokeshire Heritage Coast
- Ceredigion Heritage Coast – 35 kilometres (22 mi)

== Sites of Special Scientific Interest ==
A Site of Special Scientific Interest (SSSI) is a conservation designation denoting a protected area in the United Kingdom. SSSIs are the basic building block of site-based nature conservation legislation and most other legal nature/geological conservation designations in Great Britain are based upon them, including national nature reserves, Ramsar sites, Special Protection Areas, and Special Areas of Conservation. Sites notified for their biological interest are known as Biological SSSIs, and those notified for geological or physiographic interest are Geological SSSIs. Many SSSIs are notified for both biological and geological interest.

Lists of SSSIs

- Brecknock
- Carmarthen & Dinefwr
- Ceredigion
- Clwyd
- East Gwynedd
- Gwent
- Mid & South Glamorgan
- Montgomery
- Preseli & South Pembrokeshire
- Radnor
- West Glamorgan
- West Gwynedd

== Special Areas of Conservation ==
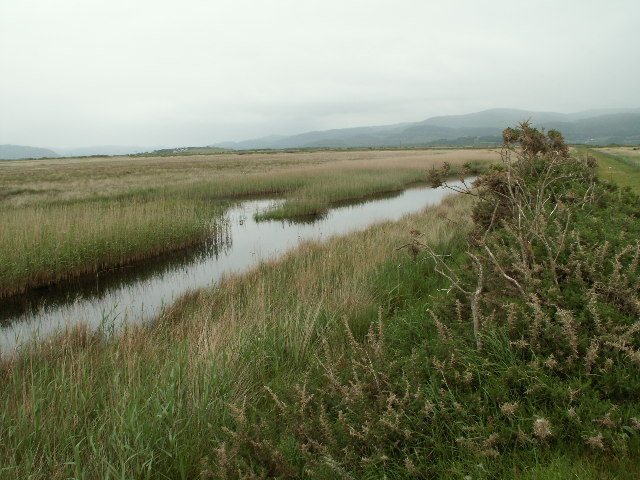
Borth Bog (Cors Fochno) is a Special Area of Conservation near Borth, Ceredigion.

A Special Area of Conservation (SAC) is defined in the European Union's Habitats Directive (92/43/EEC), also known as the Directive on the Conservation of Natural Habitats and of Wild Fauna and Flora. They are to protect the 220 habitats and approximately 1000 species listed in annex I and II of the directive which are considered to be of European interest following criteria given in the directive. They must be chosen from the Sites of Community Importance by the State Members and designated SAC by an act assuring the conservation measures of the natural habitat.

== Special Protection Areas ==
A Special Protection Area (SPA) is a designation under the European Union Directive on the Conservation of Wild Birds. Under the Directive, Member States of the European Union (EU) have a duty to safeguard the habitats of migratory birds and certain particularly threatened birds. Together with Special Areas of Conservation (SACs), the SPAs form a network of protected sites across the EU, called Natura 2000. Each SPA has an EU code – for example the Burry Inlet SPA has the code UK9015011.

== Scheduled ancient monuments ==
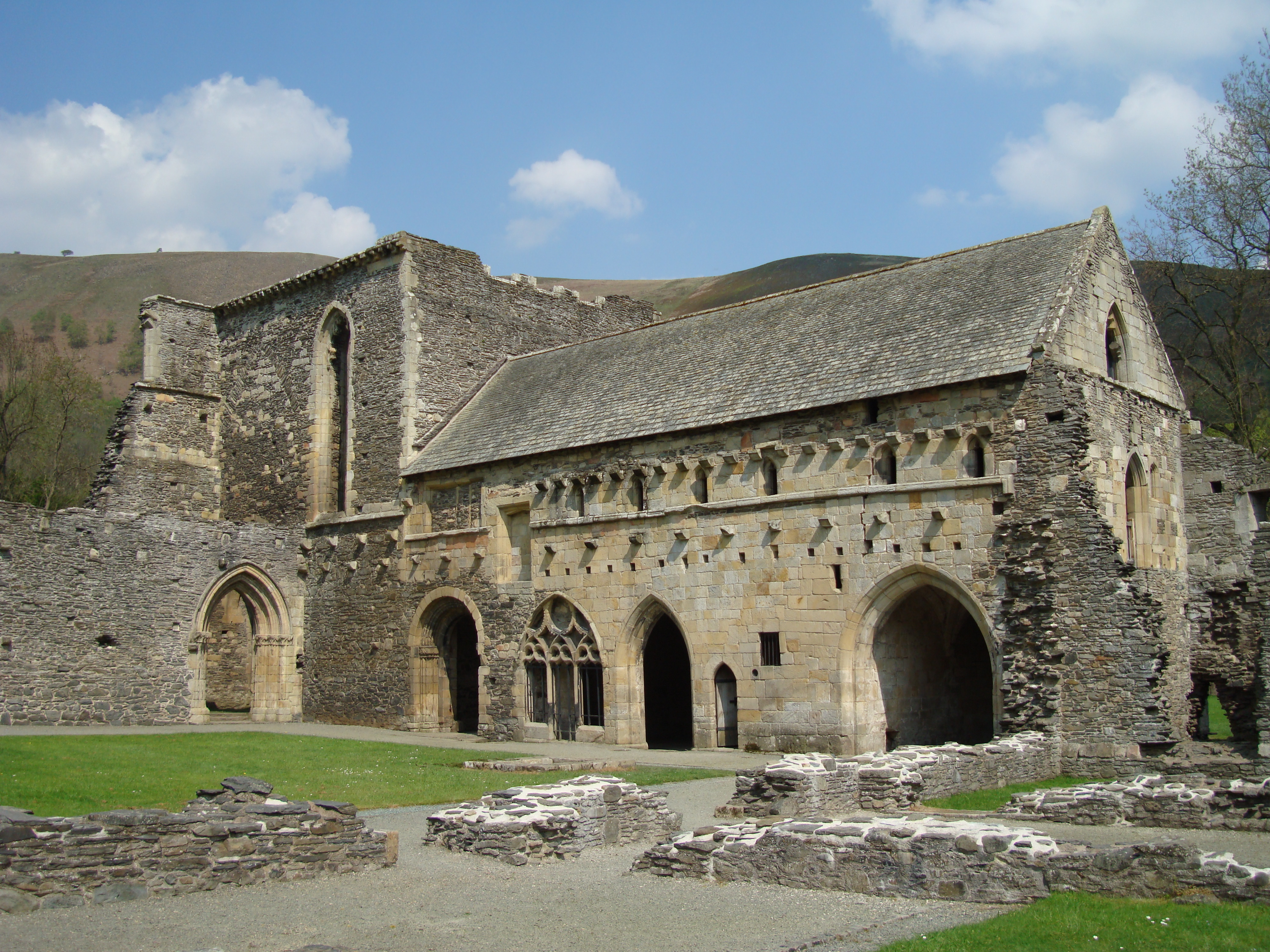
Valle Crucis Abbey is one of a number of Scheduled Monuments maintained by Cadw.

Scheduled monuments in Wales are in the care of Cadw, the historic environment service of the Welsh Government.

== Local nature reserves ==
Local nature reserves (LNR) have their origin in the recommendations of the Wild Life Conservation Special Committee (Conservation of Nature in England and Wales, Command 7122, 1947) which established the framework for nature conservation in the United Kingdom and suggested a national suite of protected areas comprising national nature reserves, conservation areas (which incorporated suggestions for Sites of Special Scientific Interest), national parks, Geological Monuments, local nature reserves and local educational nature reserves. There are now 73 LNRs in Wales, covering 55.6 square kilometres (21.5 sq mi).

== Non-statutory local designations ==
Many areas of nature conservation and geoconservation interest not protected by any of the above designations are notified as SINCs and RIGS respectively.

== Non-statutory international designations ==
Seven areas within Wales are designated by UNESCO including four World Heritage Sites, two UNESCO Global Geoparks and a Biosphere Reserve. There are also two International Dark Sky Reserves.

=== World Heritage Sites ===
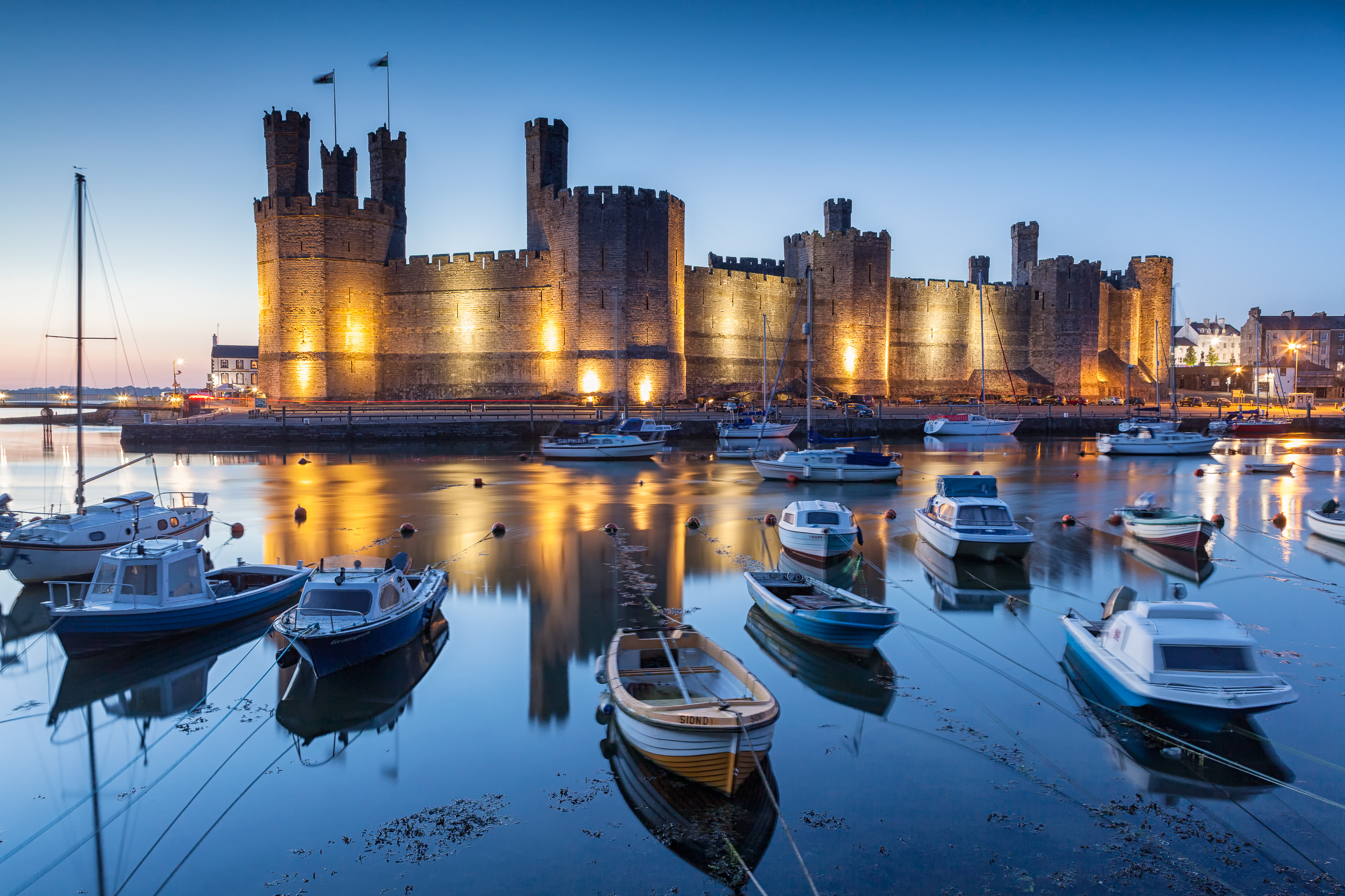
Caernarfon Castle, part of the first World Heritage Site in Wales, in 1986.

The United Nations Educational, Scientific and Cultural Organization (UNESCO) World Heritage Sites are places of importance to cultural or natural heritage as described in the UNESCO World Heritage Convention, established in 1972. With the UK ratifying the constitution of UNESCO in 1946.

There are four UNESCO World Heritage Sites in Wales. The Castles and Town Walls of King Edward in Gwynedd was first designated in 1986. Followed by the Blaenavon Industrial Landscape, Pontcysyllte Aqueduct and Canal, and the newest being the Slate Landscape of Northwest Wales designated in 2021.

All of the World Heritage Sites in Wales are designated as "cultural". The United Kingdom National Commission for UNESCO advises the UK Government, which is overall responsible for maintaining World Heritage Sites across the UK, on policies regarding UNESCO. The UK Government's Department for Culture, Media and Sport (DCMS) is the responsible department representing the UK's general compliance with the convention to UNESCO. Nominating sites and co-ordinating directly to UNESCO is reserved to the UK Government, however the powers to oversee, protect and manage historic sites is devolved to Wales. Cadw, on behalf of the Welsh Government, is responsible to identify, submit and discuss potential World Heritage Site contenders or concerns over existing sites to the DCMS for review, as well as Wales's specific compliance to the convention in regards to local protection policy. Local authorities in Wales, through their spatial planning systems, have the responsibilities to oversee any potentially inappropriate development near World Heritage Sites and to develop local protection plans for the sites, if appropriate.

UNESCO lists sites under ten criteria; each entry must meet at least one of the criteria under either "cultural" or "natural". The first four are "cultural", which applies to all of Wales's sites.

List of World Heritage Sites in Wales
Site	Image	Location	Year listed	UNESCO data	Description
Blaenavon Industrial Landscape		Blaenavon	2000	984; 2000; iii, iv	In the 19th century, Wales was the world's foremost producer of iron and coal. Blaenavon is an example of the landscape created by the industrial processes associated with the production of these materials. The site includes quarries, public buildings, workers' housing, and a railway.
Castles and Town Walls of King Edward in Gwynedd		Conwy, Isle of Anglesey and Gwynedd	1986	374; 1986; i, iii, iv	During the reign of Edward I of England (1272–1307), a series of castles was constructed in Wales with the purpose of subduing the population and establishing English colonies in Wales. The World Heritage Site covers many castles including Beaumaris, Caernarfon, Conwy, and Harlech. The castles of Edward I are considered the pinnacle of military architecture by military historians.
Pontcysyllte Aqueduct and Canal		Trevor, Wrexham and Shropshire, England	2009	1303; 2009; i, ii, iv	The aqueduct was built to carry the Ellesmere Canal over the Dee Valley. Completed during the Industrial Revolution and designed by Scottish Engineer Thomas Telford, the aqueduct made innovative use of cast and wrought iron, influencing civil engineering across the world. The heritage site extends into Shropshire in England.
The Slate Landscape of Northwest Wales		Gwynedd	2021	1633; 2021; ii, v	The six key areas, all located in Gwynedd, are: Penrhyn Slate Quarry and Bethesda, and the Ogwen Valley to Port Penrhyn; Dinorwig Slate Quarry Mountain Landscape; Nantlle Valley Slate Quarry Landscape; Gorseddau and Prince of Wales Slate Quarries, Railways and Mill; Ffestiniog: its Slate Mines and Quarries, 'city of slates' and Railway to Porthmadog; Bryneglwys Slate Quarry, Abergynolwyn Village and the Talyllyn Railway.
