= Area of Outstanding Natural Beauty (Northern Ireland) =

Designated area of countryside in Northern Ireland

Map of the eight Areas of Outstanding Natural Beauty in Northern Ireland

An Area of Outstanding Natural Beauty (AONB) in Northern Ireland, is an area of countryside that has been designated for statutory protection, due to their significant landscape value, by the Northern Ireland Environment Agency. There are eight AONBs in Northern Ireland; Antrim Coast and Glens, Binevenagh, Causeway Coast, Lagan Valley, Mourne, Ring of Gullion, Sperrin, and Strangford and Lecale.

Areas of Outstanding Natural Beauty in Northern Ireland are designated under the Amenity Lands Act (Northern Ireland) 1965 or the Nature Conservation and Amenity Lands (NI) Order 1985. Lagan Valley AONB is the oldest designated AONB in Northern Ireland designated in 1965, it is also the smallest, while Sperrin AONB is the largest AONB. The newest change was in 2010, when Strangford Lough and Lecale Coast AONBs were merged as the Strangford and Lecale AONB.

It shared the name with a similar designation used in England and Wales, until 2023 when those areas adopted the "National Landscape" terminology, although their legal name still remains AONB.

== History ==
The Amenity Lands Act (Northern Ireland) of 1965 was passed. Soon after, in 1965, the Lagan Valley AONB was designated. In 1966, the North Derry AONB and parts of south Armagh were designated. In 1967, the Lecale Coast AONB was designated. In 1968, the Sperrin AONB was designated.

In 1972, the Strangford Lough AONB was designated.

The Nature Conservation and Amenity Lands (NI) Order of 1985 was passed, replacing the 1965 legislation as the main basis for AONB designation.

Under the new legislation, in 1986, the Mourne AONB was designated. In 1988, the Antrim Coast and Glens AONB was designated. In 1989, the Causeway Coast AONB was designated. In 1991, the Ring of Gullion AONB was designated, covering the parts of south Armagh that had already been designated in 1966.

Also in the 1990s, there were two proposed AONBs, both in County Fermanagh, Erne Lakeland and Fermanagh Caveland. The Environment and Heritage Service of the Department of the Environment conducted wide consultations for the proposals in 1996–1997, with the reception being mixed.

In 2003, the Northern Ireland Environment Agency published "Shared Horizons", setting out government policy on Northern Ireland's landscapes, including Areas of Outstanding Natural Beauty. It outlines the value of AONBs for more than just scenery but also their cultural heritage, biodiversity and economic benefits.

In 2006, the Binevenagh AONB was re-designated replacing the North Derry AONB and with larger borders. In 2010, the Strangford AONB and the Lecale Coast AONB were merged into the Strangford and Lecale AONBs. By 2014, seven of the eight AONBs in Northern Ireland, were designated or re-designated under the 1985 order, except the Lagan Valley AONB which remains under the 1965 act.

In November 2023, Areas of Outstanding Natural Beauty in England and Wales adopted the branding of "National Landscapes" following a review by Julian Glover, although the legal designation there still remains as an "Area of Outstanding Natural Beauty". However, such review did not extend to Northern Ireland, therefore AONBs in Northern Ireland were not renamed as "National Landscapes", but occasionally are grouped with the equivalent designation in England and Wales.

== Management ==
Management of an AONB differs for each AONB, but fall into three forms (as of June 2020):

- Local authorities (one or multiple) manage the Ring of Gullion, and Strangford Lough and Lecale AONBs, in line with how AONBs are managed in England and Wales.
- Charitable trusts manage the Mourne, Causeway Coast, Binevenagh and Antrim Coast and Glens.
- There is no formal management body for Sperrin, but a joint statement for planning is provided through the Sperrins Forum.

Lagan Valley Regional Park Ltd oversees the Lagan Valley AONB. It is the sole AONB that remains designated under the previous legislation.

=== Designation ===
Areas of Outstanding Natural Beauty in Northern Ireland are designated under either the Amenity Lands Act (Northern Ireland) 1965 or the later Nature Conservation and Amenity Lands (NI) Order 1985. Landscapes with a distinctive character may be designated as an AONB based on the quality of their landscapes, heritage and wildlife, as well as their recreational value. The Planning Strategy for Rural Northern Ireland 1993 is used to set out planning policies to be applied to development proposals. Of the current eight AONBs in Northern Ireland, all except the Lagan Valley AONB (as of 2014), were designated or re-designated under the 1985 order.

The designation of "Area of outstanding natural beauty" differs between the two pieces of legislation. Those designated under the 1965 act focus on planning controls within their designated areas, while those under the 1985 order focus on the positive management of their designated areas. Areas designated under the 1965 act do not cease to be AONBs following the repeal of the act, unless re-designated under the 1985 order. Following the passing of the 1985 order, the Department of the Environment intended to re-designate all of the AONB from the 1965 act to be under the 1985 order. By 2003, it had re-designated the Mourne, Causeway Coast, Antrim Coast and Glens, and the Ring of Gullion AONBs. The 1985 order also allows the designation for the first national park in Northern Ireland. The Northern Ireland Environment Agency (part of the Department of Agriculture, Environment and Rural Affairs of the Northern Ireland Executive) is responsible for designating AONBs in Northern Ireland, and facilitates their management.

Article 14 of the Nature Conservation and Amenity Lands (Northern Ireland) Order 1985 sets out the objectives for AONB designation, in principle. For an area to be designated as an AONB, the agency may develop proposals that:

- Conserve or enhance the natural beauty or amenities of an area
- Conserve wildlife, historic objects or natural phenomena of an area
- Promote public's enjoyment of the area
- Provide or maintain public access to the area

The agency would utilise an AONB designation to increase awareness for the "outstanding qualities" of the designated area and seek to ensure that the special qualities of the area are recognised and result in tangible achievements for the area's conservation. The Northern Ireland Executive's departments and district councils have a statutory duty to have regard for the conservation needs of the area's natural beauty and the amenity of the countryside. The department will also assess whether particular policies or activities affect the conservation and well-being of an AONB, while also encouraging and assisting where it can under a co-ordinated conservation approach.

AONBs are classed under International Union for Conservation of Nature Category V of protected areas, a "Protected Landscape/Seascape". They are the largest and most well-known landscape designation in Northern Ireland.

== List of areas ==
Areas of Outstanding Natural Beauty cover 20–24% of Northern Ireland's land area, and about 70% of its coastline. The eight areas are:

- Antrim Coast and Glens AONB – Designated in 1988, covering the coastline of County Antrim, from Ballycastle to Larne. It also includes Rathlin Island, and is dominated by the Antrim Plateau.
- Binevenagh AONB – Designated in 2006, but a re-designation, replacing the North Derry AONB which was designated in 1966. It covers an area between the Roe estuary and Magilligan, covering Binevenagh mountain, the Bann estuary, and the sand dunes of Portstewart.
- Causeway Coast AONB – Designated in 1989, and covers the Giant's Causeway, Northern Ireland's sole World Heritage Site. It covers 18 miles (30 km) of coastline.
- Lagan Valley AONB – Designated in 1965, and mainly lies within the Lagan Valley Regional Park (the park itself designated in 1967). It centres on the River Lagan and close to the Belfast metropolitan area.
- Mourne AONB – Designated in 1986, it covers the Mourne Mountains. Within it are the twelve peaks of the range, including Slieve Donard, Northern Ireland's highest mountain standing at 850 metres (2,790 ft), as well as Slieve Croob. It also covers 25 miles (40 km) of coastline.
- Ring of Gullion AONB – Designated in 1991, it surrounds the mountain of Slieve Gullion which sits at the centre of the AONB. Circling the mountain is a ring of lower rugged hills known as the Ring of Gullion, which give the AONB its name and is one of the most known ring dykes in the British Isles, and the first one in the world to be geologically mapped.
- Sperrin AONB – Designated in 1968, covering mountainous areas, from the Strule valley in the west towards the Lough Neagh lowlands in the east. It is the largest AONB in Northern Ireland. It was redesignated in 2008, increasing its size from 101,000 hectares (390 sq mi; 1,010 km^{2}) to 118,206 hectares (456.40 sq mi; 1,182.06 km^{2}) to cover foothills in the north of the AONB. It is named after and covers the Sperrins mountain range of Northern Ireland, and the range's various valleys and uplands.
- Strangford and Lecale AONB – Designated in 2010, the follows the shores of Strangford Lough and up the River Quoile, the town of Downpatrick and towards the Irish Sea coast. It was formed from the merger of the Strangford Lough AONB (designated in 1972) and the Lecale Coast AONB (designated in 1967).

AONB	Photo	Established	Area	Local authorities	Map
Antrim Coast and Glens		1988	724 km^{2} (280 sq mi)	Causeway Coast and Glens; Mid and East Antrim	
Binevenagh		2006 (re-designation) 1966 (as North Derry AONB)	138 km^{2} (53 sq mi)	Causeway Coast and Glens	
Causeway Coast		1989	42 km^{2} (16 sq mi)	Causeway Coast and Glens	
Lagan Valley		1965	39 km^{2} (15 sq mi)	Belfast; Lisburn and Castlereagh	
Mourne		1986	570 km^{2} (220 sq mi)	Armagh City, Banbridge and Craigavon; Newry, Mourne and Down	
Ring of Gullion		1991 (Parts were designated in 1966)	154 km^{2} (59 sq mi)	Newry, Mourne and Down	
Sperrin		1968	1,181 km^{2} (456 sq mi)	Causeway Coast and Glens; Derry City and Strabane; Fermanagh and Omagh; Mid Ulster	
Strangford and Lecale		2010 (merger) Previously 1967 (Lecale Coast) and 1972 (Strangford Lough).	525 km^{2} (203 sq mi)	Ards and North Down; Newry, Mourne and Down	

=== Former areas ===
- North Derry AONB – Designated in 1966. Replaced by the Binevenagh AONB, with slightly bigger borders, in 2006.
- Lecale Coast AONB – Designated in 1967. Merged with the Strangford Lough AONB in 2010, to form the Strangford and Lecale AONB.
- Strangford Lough AONB – Designated in 1972. Merged with the Lecale Coast AONB in 2010, to form the Strangford and Lecale AONB.

=== Proposed areas ===
- Erne Lakeland – First proposed in the 1990s. The Environment and Heritage Service of the Department of the Environment conducted wide consultations for the proposal in 1996–1997, for both of the AONBs proposals in County Fermanagh. The reception was mixed. By 2018, there were no plans to designate the area as an AONB.
- Fermanagh Caveland – First proposed in the 1990s, to extend from the Cliffs of Magho southwards towards Cuilcagh. The Environment and Heritage Service of the Department of the Environment conducted wide consultations for the proposal in 1996–1997, for both of the AONBs proposals in County Fermanagh. The reception was mixed. Part of Fermanagh itself was proposed to be Northern Ireland's first National Park. By 2018, there were no plans to designate the area as an AONB.

== See also ==
- National Landscapes in England
- National Landscapes in Wales
- National scenic area (Scotland)
- List of national parks of the Republic of Ireland
