= Thomas Davis GFC, Corrinshego =

Armagh-based Gaelic games club

- CLG Tomás Dáibhis , Cor Fhuinseoige
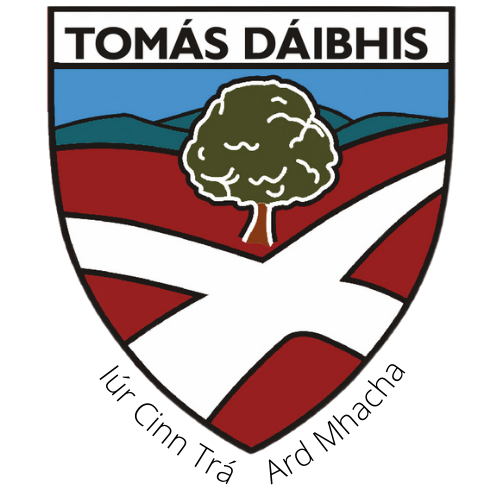
- Founded: 1905
- County: Armagh
- Colours: Maroon & White
- Grounds: Doran's Hill

Playing kits
Standard colours

Thomas Davis Gaelic Football Club, Corrinshego (Irish: Cumann Pheil Gaelach Tomás Dáibhis, Cor Fhuinseoige), also known as Corrinshego GFC, is a Gaelic football club in County Armagh, Northern Ireland. It is part of the Armagh GAA and plays in its Division 3A Football League and the Armagh Junior Football Championship. The club is named in honour of Thomas Davis, an Irish writer, poet and nationalist.

== History ==
The Thomas Davis Club was established in Corrinshego, County Armagh in 1905. The club's foundation coincided with the Gaelic Revival and alongside the GAA club, a branch of the Gaelic League, the Irish-Ireland movement and Sinn Féin was established.

The club participated in a range of cultural activities including Gaelic games in their first decade of existence but there is no record of them having participated in structured league or championship competitions.

During the War of Independence, four members of the club were murdered, suspected by members of the RIC or British Army.

The club's first foray into organised competition came when they won the 1930 Camlough and District Football League and continued to participate in competitions throughout the 1930s.

By the 1940s, the club was fielding multiple teams in both junior and senior grades, as well as hosting a camogie club, known as St Ethna's. During this period, Thomas Davis defeated Crossmaglen Rangers in the Armagh Senior Football Championship and won the South Armagh Junior Football Championship. The club was also the host venue for the 1946 Ulster Senior Camogie Final between Armagh and Antrim.

The club briefly went on hiatus and was reformed in 1954, competing until 1960, when it folded again.

It was revived in 1982, winning that year's Armagh Junior Football Championship. Camogie was also restarted, with Thomas Davis reaching the 1984 Armagh Intermediate Camogie Final.

The revived club first played its games at Corrinshego crossroads, then at Carnagat Road until a school was built on the land. In the late 1990s, the club opened new clubrooms and a junior pitch at Corrinshego, but the senior team was required to use a council facility in the nearby village of Meigh.

In 2013, Thomas Davis moved from its former home near Corrinshego crossroads to a purpose-built facility at Doran's Hill in the neighbouring townland of Altnaveigh. which includes a full sized pitch and community hub with conference and changing facilities. It hosted the Armagh County Convention in 2024.

== Facilities ==
The club opened a purpose-built hall in 1947 near Corrinshego cross roads. Built in the form of a Nissen hut, this clubhouse was in use until the 1990s when a new clubroom and bar was built next to it.

Since 1982, the club played at a variety of locations. From 1982 until the late 1990s, the majority of home games were played at Carnagat Road, until the land was handed back to the church and Rathore School was built. Throughout much of the next decade, home games were played on a council facility in Meigh, a few miles away.

At underage level, the club acquired some land in the Corrinshigo townland next to the clubhouse. This pitch was primarily used for Under 12 and below and for senior training.

In 2013, the club moved to a purpose-built facility on Doran's Hill with full sized pitch and clubrooms. The previous site in Corrinshego is now used for housing.

Future plans include the discussed second pitch, the possibility of a spectator stand and associated works.

== Honours ==
- Armagh Junior Football Championship (1)
  - 1982
- Green Cross Cup
  - 1995
- Armagh Junior 3B Football League
  - Junior 3B 2013, 2024
  - Division 3 1983
- Camlough District Junior Football league
  - 1930
- Malocca Camogie Cup
  - 1946 (St Ethna's CC)
- South Armagh Junior Football Championship
  - 1944
- South Armagh Junior Football League
  - 1944
