= Ring of Gullion =

Geological area in Northern Ireland

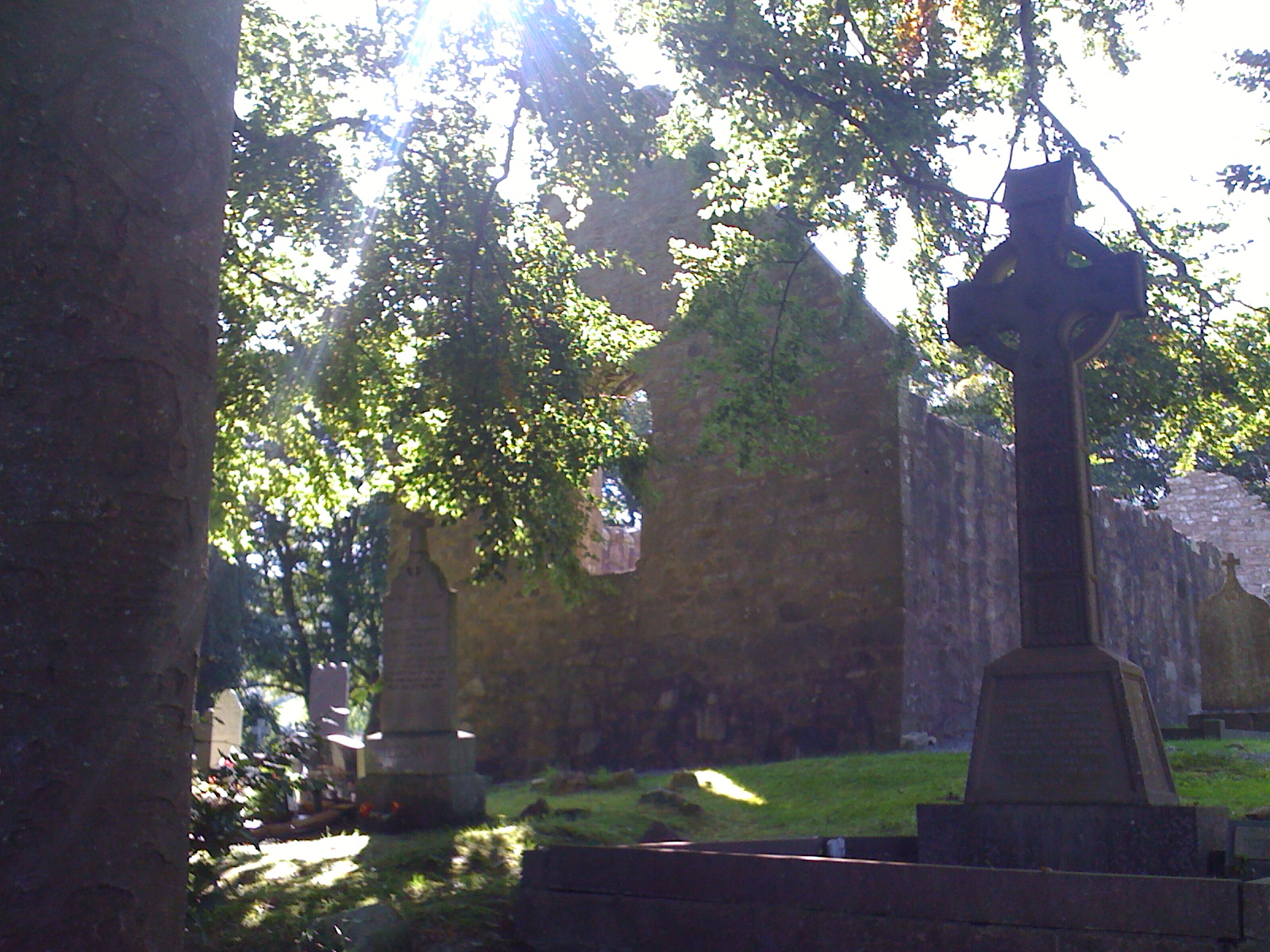
- Ruins of the early Christian Killeavy old Church

- Location within Northern Ireland
- Location: County Armagh, Northern Ireland
- Coordinates: 54.129°N 6.434°W
- Area: 152.39 km^{2} (58.84 sq mi)
- Established: 1991
- Governing body: Department of Environment
- Website: www.ringofgullion.org
- AONB map: Map of the AONB in Northern Ireland

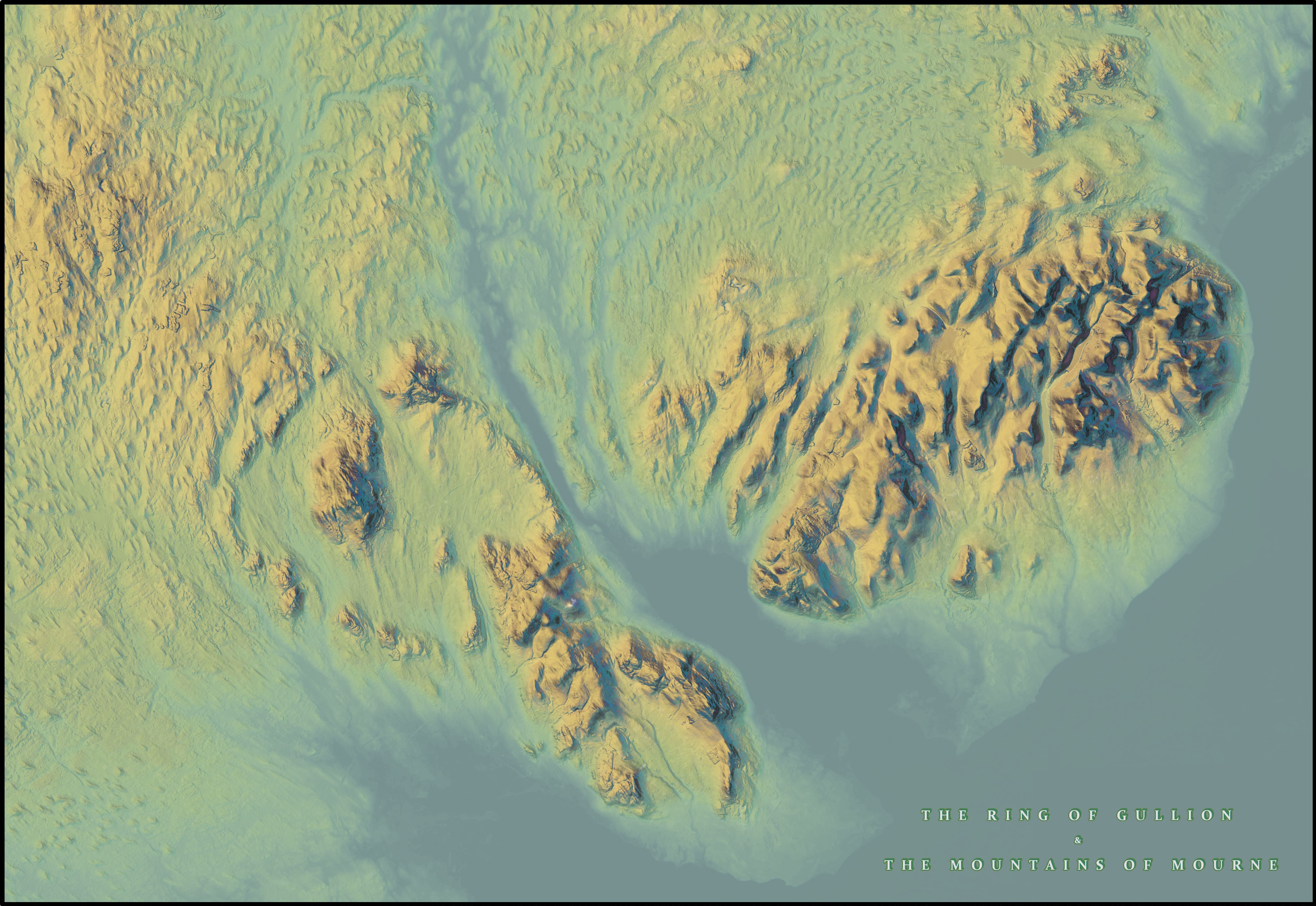
Topographic Elevation map of the Ring of Gullion and the Mourne Mountains.

The Ring of Gullion (Irish: Fáinne Cnoc Shliabh gCuillinn, meaning 'the ring of Slieve Gullion') is a geological formation and area, officially designated as an Area of Outstanding Natural Beauty, (AONB) located in County Armagh, Northern Ireland. The area centres on Slieve Gullion, the highest peak in County Armagh, measures roughly 42 by 18 kilometres (26 by 11 mi) and comprises some 150 km^{2} defined topographically by the hills of an ancient ring dyke. Parts of the area have also been officially listed as Areas of Special Scientific Interest.

The geological formation was the first ring dyke to be mapped, although its significance was not understood until similar structures had been described from Scotland. It was emplaced during the Paleogene opening of the Atlantic Ocean during the formation of the North Atlantic Igneous Province.

== Geological history and features ==
The structure of the ring dyke was produced when the active volcano's caldera underwent collapse producing a concentric suite of faults providing space into which magma was able to intrude. The ring dyke is composite with both porphyritic granophyre and porphyritic felsite components. The composition of the remainder of the volcano today is dominated by gabbro and granophyre and is also the site of a noted occurrence of platinum group elements.

The rocks of the area are complex and have featured in international geological debate since the 1950s. The site has attracted geologists from all over the world and featured in a number of theories that have been put forward to explain the unusual rock relationships. Some of these theories have now become an accepted part of geological science.

Chief amongst the source of debate is the interaction of disparate forces in shaping the modern geology of the area: rock from the Silurian period, shaped and interspersed by more than one period of volcanic activity and later glacial forces which have led to the highly unusual nature of the area today.

In terms of the development of this geology, some of the areas rocks date from the Silurian period when and formed part of an ancient ocean more than 400 million years ago Added to this landscape, the volcano added masses of molten granitic rock or magma, which forms the bedrock that underlies Newry town and much of the Slieve Gullion area. These igneous rocks are some 390 million years old. Further volcanic activity took place during the Tertiary period, some 66 million years ago. The complex nature of the formation of the area has led to the debates as to origin but it is speculated that much of the modern geology of the area began with the development of a very large volcano of which little now remains. Volcanoes also erupted in the south of the area and as a result, remains of volcanic necks can be found in the hills around Forkhill. Along the contact zone between the Silurian rocks and the Newry granite a roughly circular fracture developed into which was intruded a series of acidic lavas. These cooled to form very hard granophyre and felsite rocks – in fact two 'ring dykes' or the "outer" and "inner" rings.

Slieve Gullion itself is in fact a more recent addition than the ring dykes which surround it and is made up of layers of igneous rock. As with the ring itself, there has been some debate as to their origins. One suggestion is that a huge explosive eruption of the volcano created a vast crater, or caldera, into which lavas were excluded in layers. Another more plausible explanation is that the lavas were extruded in layers. There is evidence of many highly unusual features developed by the interaction of basic and acidic magmas.

Added to this complex interaction of pre-volcanic and volcanic activity, the area was subject to the action of glaciers during successive Ice Ages. Deep valleys were formed as glaciers exploited weaknesses in the rocks (faults and softer rocks) while hills were scoured leaving craggy outcrops, boulder strewn slopes and rocky ridges and hollows and rounded drumlins were formed in valley floors. The 'tail' of Slieve Gullion, which itself forms the 'crag', is seen at Dromintee, and is a ridge of boulder clay deposited in the wake of Slieve Gullion as it was overrun by ice moving from the north.

Bar the main feature of Slieve Gullion and its rocky ring, their area includes a number of lakes and parks in the area, including the following:

=== Slieve Gullion Forest Park ===
Slieve Gullion Forest Park, owned and managed by the Forest Service, includes many acres of natural and planted forest, and eight mile scenic drive, and a way-marked trail which brings the traveller almost halfway up the height of the mountain, to the summit. The scenic drive overlooks the Ring of Gullion, Mourne Mountains, Cooley Peninsula and Armagh Drumlins. The path offers access to both the cairns on top of the mountain and the lake, while the Courtyard Centre has a garden, refreshments and toilet facilities.

=== Camlough Lake ===
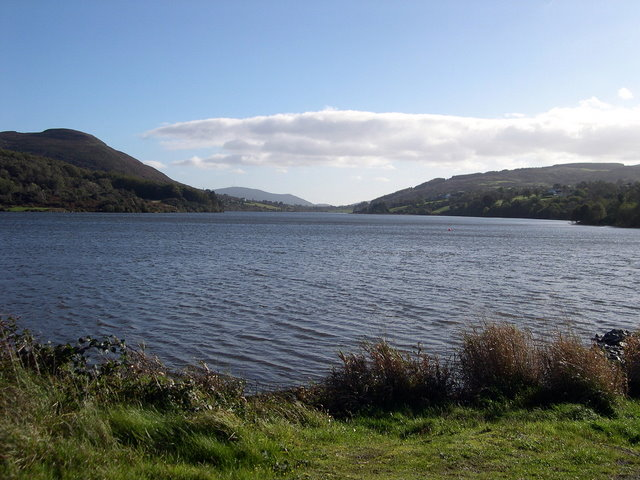
Camlough Lake, October 2006

Camlough Lake or Camloch (from the Irish for Crooked Lake) was formed as a glacial ribbon lake, and takes its name from its irregular shape; although its modern form does not appear particularly crooked, its shape was much less regular in the past before its level was raised by the embankment built in the late 19th century. The glacial left-over sits in a valley carved between Slieve Gullion and Camlough Mountain and is today the largest lake in the Ring of Gullion.

Close to the shore of the lake is an approximately one kilometre long tunnel, wide enough to drive an articulated truck into, which was excavated in the 1960s as part of a planned development intended to create a man-made cavern within Slieve Gullion mountain which was to have been used to store and release water to generate electricity. It was planned that the pumped hydro storage scheme, when operational, would generate more than 200 megawatts of electricity had it been completed; however, plans were shelved with the onset of the troubles.

=== Cashel Lakes ===
Upper and lower Cashel Lakes (or Cashel Loughs), together with Carrigans Lough are attractive upland lakes with clean unpolluted water, home to a recorded 30 species of water beetle, 15 species of spider and 10 species of ground beetle.

== Cultural heritage ==
The Ring of Gullion has numerous associations with Irish legends and myths, and several remains from the pre-Norman, and indeed pre-Christian era. In the Táin Bó Cuailgne (the Cattle raid of Cooley) Cú Chulainn is reputed to have defended Ulster, single-handed, against the armies of Queen Maeve of Connacht at the Gap of the North, which lies at the south of the area. In another tale, Fionn Mac Cumhaill was bewitched by the Sorceress Miluchra on the summit of Slieve Gullion at the Lough of calliagh Bhirra and turned into an old, decrepit man. Although he managed to have the spell undone, his hair remained white thereafter. To this day the superstition survives that if you bathe in the lough your hair will turn white.

Human habitation in the Ring of Gullion is said to have occurred for at least 6000 years and a rich inheritance of historic monuments survives to mark the duration of that settlement. The area contains the remains of 20 or so large stone tombs and the King's Ring at Clontygora, and the Ballymacdermot tomb are two of the best examples of Court Tombs in the Northern Ireland. The monument at Ballykeel is also an outstanding example of a Portal Tomb while the South Cairn on the summit of Slieve Gullion has the distinction of being the highest surviving Passage Tomb in Britain or Ireland.

During the eighteenth Century, the last great age of Irish language literature, the Ring of Gullion was known as the District of Poets or District of Songs. Well-known poets associated with the area included Séamus Mór Mac Mhurchaidh, Art Mac Cumhaigh, and Peadar Ó Doirnín.

Among the cultural and architectural heritage of the area are the following sites:

=== The Dorsey ===
From the Irish Doirse, which means 'Doors' or 'gates', this Iron Age earthwork is located at Dorsey on the western edge of the Ring of Gullion. The structure consists of two roughly parallel massive earth bank and ditch ramparts over a mile long lie astride an old routeway to Eamhain Macha (Navan Fort, near Armagh – the ancient capital of Ulster). Recent evidence dates part of the monument to around 100BC, contemporary with a major phase of activity at Navan and lending support to the tradition that the Dorsey was once the 'gateway' to Ulster.

The function of the Dorsey is a matter of debate. It has been suggested that it was a defensive enclosure related to the Black Pig's Dyke whilst others suggest that it was simply to serve as two lines of linear embankment and was not an enclosure at all. Otherwise, it has been speculated that the site had a ritual function, however, its true purpose has yet to be determined.

=== Kilnasaggart Stone ===
From the Irish Cill na Sagart for Church of the Priests, this 2.8-metre pillar stone is held to be possibly the oldest dateable stone monument in Ireland. An inscription on the stone reads "In loc so Taninmarni Ternoc mac Cernan Bic er cul Peter Apstel", or that Ternoc the son of Cernan Bic put the place under the protection of Peter the Apostle. As Ternoc's death is recorded in the annals of 714 or 716, the stone can reasonably be dated to around AD700.

The stone marks the site of an early Christian cemetery and a church was probably located close by. The original church was a 5th-century Patrician foundation originally called Domnach Culind (Gullion Church). The poet Eóchaid Rígéices is buried here according to the 11th century Laud Genealogies- Mac dond Óengus-sin Eocho Rígéices, qui hospitatus apud Daimíne & qui sepultus est in Domnuch Cuilind ("Aengus had a son Eochaid, the royal poet, who visited Daimine Daim Argat and who is buried in the church at Slieve Gullion"). He was the first cousin and nephew of the Ulaid kings Muiredach Muinderg and Forga mac Dallán mheic Dubthach. Excavations at the site in 1966 and 1968 revealed an early Christian graveyard with graves oriented radially around the pillar and facing towards the rising sun. The stone stands on the ancient road which ran from [Tara] in County Meath and through the Moyry Pass to Dunseverick Head on the North Antrim Coast (Sighe Midhlachra), and close to the modern border between Northern Ireland and the Republic of Ireland.

=== Killevy Churches ===
From the Irish Cill Shléibhe for Mountain Church, this site held one of early Christian Ireland's most important early monastic sites. Founded by St Monnina in the 5th century, the site at the foot of Slieve Gullion is largely restricted to two adjacent churches, a graveyard, the reputed grave of St Monnina's grave, and a small holy well still visited by pilgrims on her feast day, 6 July. The West Church dates from the 11th century. It is the smaller and more ancient of the two with an impressive lintel doorway. The East Church dates from the 15th century and has an impressive arched window with angel carvings still visible.

Following plundering by the Vikings in 923, monastic life continued and the site was occupied by the Augustinian Nuns until 1542 with the dissolution of the Monasteries.

=== Moyry Castle ===
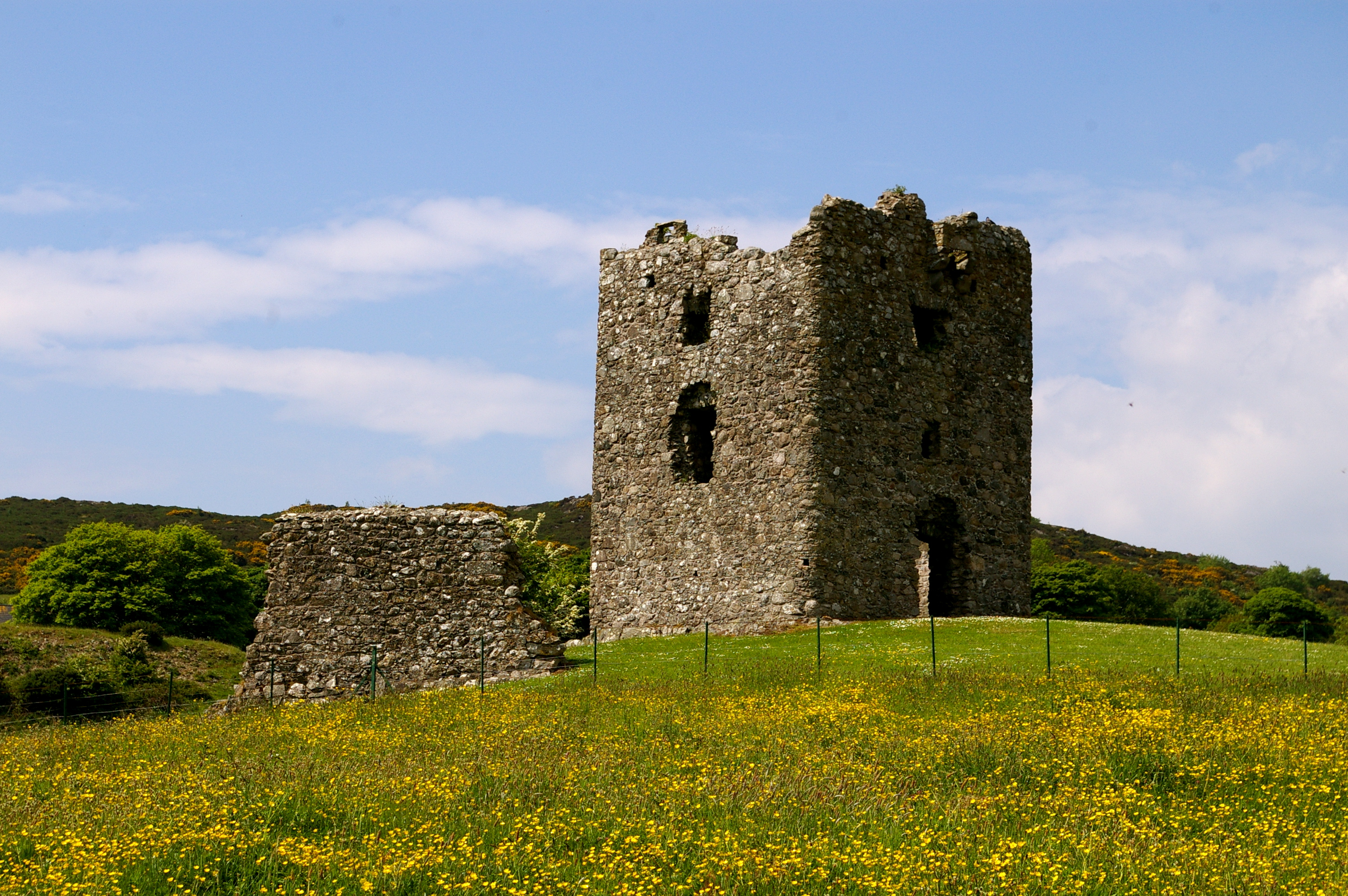
Moyry Castle, May 2008

Just to the south of Jonesborough lies a strategic mountain pass known as Moyry Pass or the 'Gap of the North', above which Lord Mountjoy built Moyry Castle on a rocky outcrop in 1601, a year after his capturing the area for the crown. The pass itself market the most favoured ancient route between the provinces of Ulster and Leinster as it was said to be the widest route through which an army could pass while under attack. Now ruined, the castle was built as a three-storey tower with rounded corners and gun loops and can be clearly seen from the modern railroad line (laid in 1852).

The area in which the castle is located remains mountainous and boggy although no longer heavily wooded and little remains of the stone bawn wall which once surrounded the castle bar one stretch to the south east.

== Settlement ==
Most of the Ring of Gullion sits within the old Barony of Orior Upper within County Armagh, and lies within the boundaries of Newry and Mourne District Council.

=== List of places in the Ring of Gullion area ===
- Altnaveigh
- Aughanduff
- Belleeks
- Bessbrook
- Camlough
- Corrinshego
- Dorsy
- Dromintee
- Fathom
- Forkill
- Jonesborough
- Killeen
- Lislea
- Meigh
- Mullaghbawn
- Newtowncloghoge
- Silverbridge

== AONB and official status ==
Map of the AONB in Northern Ireland

The Ring of Gullion was designated an Area of Outstanding Natural Beauty by order of the Department of Environment in December 1991.

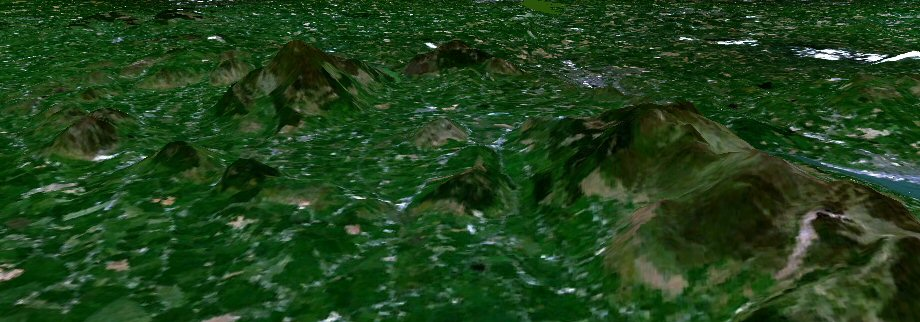
Composite 3-D satellite view of the Ring of Gullion from NASA World Wind

The AONB area of the Ring of Gullion includes the Mountain Ring and its various slopes, but also there is a deviation to the west to include the famous Dorsey Enclosure. In the west it also includes the valley of the Cully Water and the Umeracam River which separate the hills of the ring dyke from the rolling drumlin landscape extending towards Crossmaglen and Cullyhanna. In the north-west the ring dyke runs through the higher ground of the Fews where it is picked out by sharp rocky hills with distinctive heath vegetation (which is the derivation of The Fews name). To the east its boundary is the Newry Canal and the Newry River flowing towards Carlingford Lough under the brow of Anglesey and Flagstaff Mountains.

The countryside of the Ring of Gullion area was designated the Slieve Gullion Environmentally Sensitive Area (ESA) in June 1994 and is run by the Department of Agriculture and Rural Development. ESA designation is a voluntary scheme which provides financial encouragement for farmers to adopt farming practices which maintain and enhance the landscape, wildlife and heritage of their land holding.

In 2023, the Ring of Gullion was awarded Global Geopark status by UNESCO.

== Management ==
The Ring of Gullion is managed by Ring of Gullion Partnership. There is one paid staff member who implements the Management Plan 2010–2016 and four who implement the Landscape Conservation Action Plan. Staff are administered by Newry, Mourne and Down District Council (NMDDC). This management is funded through NIEA, NMDDC and the Heritage Lottery Fund. There are also several other smaller project funders.

== Transport ==
The M1 / A1 motorway passes through the east of the area with a number of exits between (and at) Newry and Dundalk providing access to the area.

Rail transport may also be used to reach the area with both NI Railways and Iarnród Éireann serving Newry and Dundalk respectively and the Enterprise calling at both Dundalk Clarke railway station and Newry railway station.
