= Bill Eagles =

British film and television director

- Occupation(s): Film director, television director
- Years active: 1993–present

Bill Eagles is a British film and television director. He is best known for directing the 2000 film Beautiful Creatures starring Susan Lynch and Rachel Weisz.

As a television director, he moved to Los Angeles in 2003 and worked for 10 years directing TV movies, mini series and episodic TV. Some his credits include CSI: Crime Scene Investigation, Gotham, Invasion, Cold Case, Numb3rs, Battlestar Galactica, Terminator: The Sarah Connor Chronicles, Threshold, Crash, Persons Unknown, Fringe and Pennyworth. He has also directed a number of television films in his native United Kingdom.
