= Ballard, County Armagh =

Townland in Northern Ireland

Coordinates: 54.146°N 6.445°W

Ballard (from Irish Baile Ard 'High Town, townland on the mountain') is a townland on the upper slopes of Slieve Gullion in County Armagh, Northern Ireland. It is within the parish of Killevy, Barony of Orior Upper and the Newry, Mourne and Down District Council area.

It is bordered by the townlands of Lislea, Aghmakane, Ballintemple, Levallymore and Slieve Gullion.
