= National Landscape =

Designated area of countryside in England and Wales

National Landscapes in England and Wales

A National Landscape (Welsh: Tirwedd Cenedlaethol), formally and formerly an Area of Outstanding Natural Beauty (AONB; Welsh: Ardal o Harddwch Naturiol Eithriadol, AHNE), is one of 38 areas of countryside in England and Wales that has been designated for conservation due to its significant landscape value. The current name was adopted in 2023.

Areas are designated in recognition of their national importance by the relevant public body: Natural England or Natural Resources Wales, respectively. On 22 November 2023, following a review, the AONBs in England and Wales adopted the National Landscapes name, and are in the process of rebranding. The name "area of outstanding natural beauty" is still the designated legal term.

Northern Ireland has eight areas that maintain the name "Area of Outstanding Natural Beauty", as the renaming did not apply to Northern Ireland which is under different legislation. Scotland uses the similar national scenic area (NSA) designation.

National Landscapes enjoy levels of protection from development similar to those of UK national parks, but unlike national parks the responsible bodies do not have their own planning powers. They also differ from national parks in their more limited opportunities for extensive outdoor recreation.

There are 38 National Landscapes, 33 wholly in England, four wholly in Wales and one on the England–Wales border, as well as a further eight AONBs in Northern Ireland.

== History ==
The idea for what would eventually become the AONB designation was first put forward by John Dower in his 1945 Report to the Government on National Parks in England and Wales. Dower suggested there was need for protection of certain naturally beautiful landscapes that were unsuitable as national parks owing to their small size and lack of wildness. Dower's recommendation for the designation of these "other amenity areas" was eventually embodied in the National Parks and Access to the Countryside Act 1949 as the AONB designation.

== Purpose ==
The purpose of an AONB designation in England and Wales is to conserve and enhance the natural beauty of the designated landscape.

There are two secondary aims: meeting the need for quiet enjoyment of the countryside and having regard for the interests of those who live and work there. To achieve these aims, AONBs rely on planning controls and practical countryside management. As they have the same landscape quality, AONBs may be compared to the national parks of England and Wales. National parks are well known in the UK; by contrast, there is evidence to indicate many residents in AONBs may be unaware of the status. However, the National Association of AONBs launched initiatives to increase awareness of AONBs in local communities, and, in 2014, successfully negotiated to have the boundaries of AONBs in England shown on Google Maps.

== Statistical overview ==
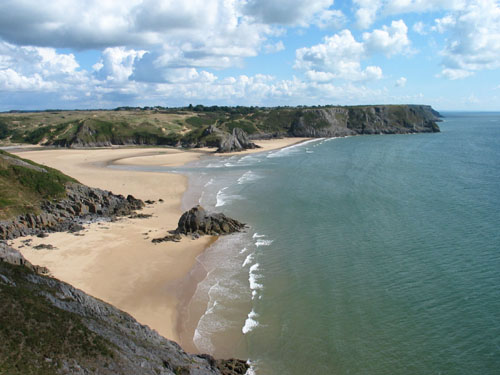
View over Three Cliffs Bay in the Gower Peninsula, the first designated Area of Outstanding Natural Beauty

There are 46 "Areas of Outstanding Natural Beauty" in the United Kingdom in total, 33 in England, four in Wales, one on the England–Wales border, and a further eight AONBs in Northern Ireland. Those in England and Wales are branded as "National Landscapes".

The first AONB was established in 1956 on the Gower Peninsula in South Wales, and the most recent to be designated is the Tamar Valley AONB, established in 1995. More recent changes include the Clwydian Range AONB being extended in 2012 to form the Clwydian Range and Dee Valley AONB, and in Northern Ireland, the Strangford Lough and Lecale Coast AONBs were merged to form a single AONB in 2010.

AONBs vary greatly in terms of size, type and use of land, and whether they are partly or wholly open to the public. The smallest AONB is the Isles of Scilly, 16 km^{2} (6.2 sq mi), and the largest is the Cotswolds, 2,038 km^{2} (787 sq mi). AONBs cover around 15% of England and 4% of Wales.

== Legal status and organisation ==
Areas of Outstanding Natural Beauty in England and Wales (now also National Landscapes) were originally created under the same legislation as the national parks, the National Parks and Access to the Countryside Act 1949. Unlike AONBs, national parks have special legal powers to prevent unsympathetic development. AONBs in general remain the responsibility of their local authorities by means of special committees that include members appointed by a minister and by parishes, and only very limited statutory duties were imposed on local authorities within an AONB by the original 1949 Act. However, further regulation and protection of AONBs in England and Wales was added by the Countryside and Rights of Way (CRoW) Act 2000, under which new designations are now made,

In the National Planning Policy Framework (March 2012), the government stated that AONBs and national parks have equal status when it comes to planning decisions on landscape issues. Two of the AONBs (the Cotswolds and the Chilterns), which extend into a large number of local authority areas, have their own statutory bodies, known as conservation boards. In 2019, the Glover Report made various recommendations regarding the future of AONBs – the report's 'central proposal' being to bring National Parks and AONBs together as part of one 'family of national landscapes'. Following the report the Cotswolds Conservation Board announced in September 2020 that they were re-styling the area name and it is now known as the Cotswolds National Landscape. The UK Government later accepted the report's recommendation for the AONBs in England to use "National Landscape".

All English and Welsh AONBs have a dedicated AONB officer and other staff. As required by the CRoW Act, each AONB has a management plan that sets out the characteristics and special qualities of the landscape and how they will be conserved and enhanced. The AONBs are collectively represented by the "National Landscapes Association", previously the "National Association for Areas of Outstanding Natural Beauty" (NAAONB), an independent registered charity in England and Wales acting on behalf of AONBs and their partners, which had used the slogan "Landscapes for Life".

AONBs in Northern Ireland are designated under separate legislation, originally under the Amenity Lands (NI) Act 1965; later replaced by the Nature Conservation and Amenity Lands (NI) Order 1985. The Northern Ireland Environment Agency (part of the Department of Agriculture, Environment and Rural Affairs of the Northern Ireland Executive) is responsible for designating AONBs in Northern Ireland, and facilitates their management.

On 22 November 2023, following a 2022 Landscapes Review policy paper by Julian Glover, the AONBs in England and Wales adopted the National Landscapes name, and subsequently rebranded. The name "area of outstanding natural beauty" is still the designated legal term. The review did not extend to Northern Ireland, and its AONBs did not adopt the new name.

== Threats ==
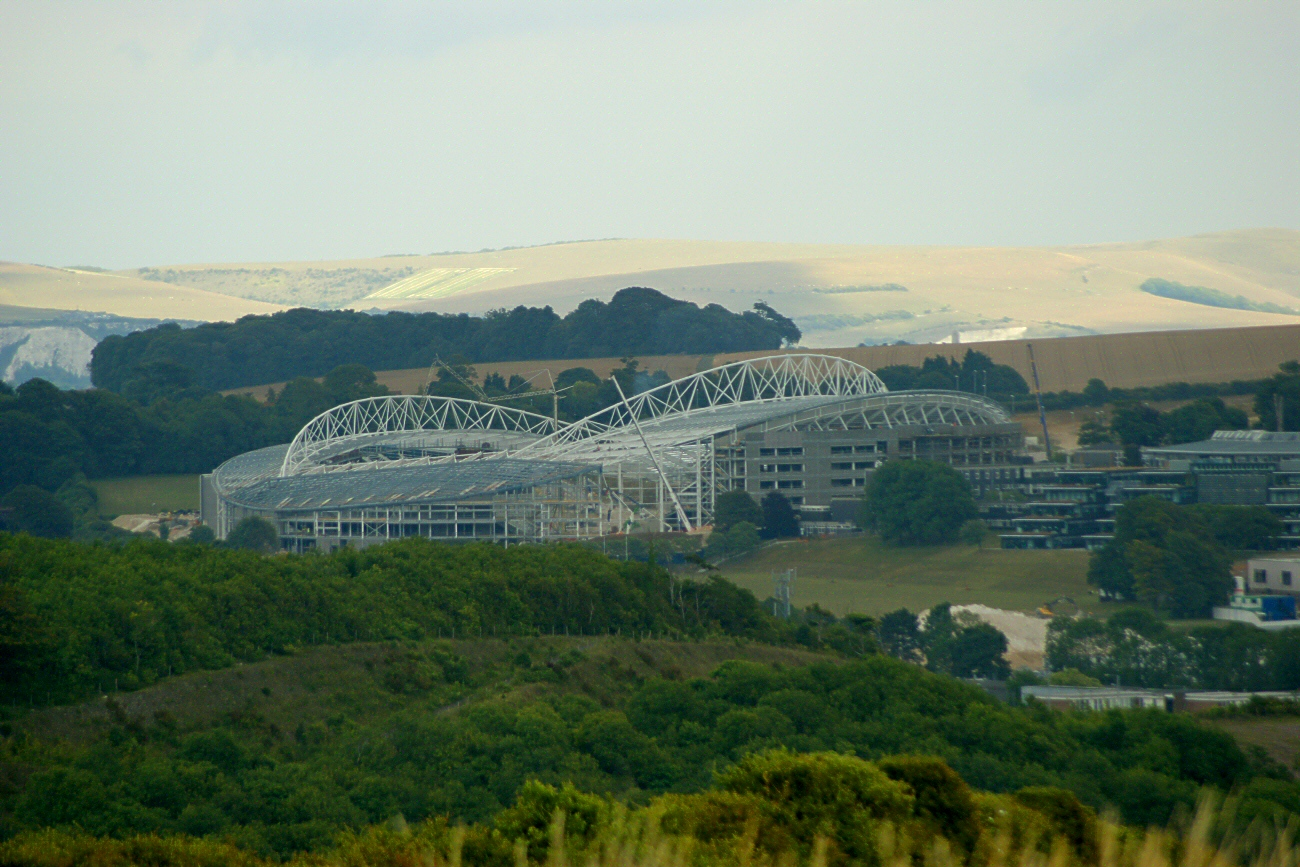
Falmer Stadium under construction in 2010 in the former Sussex Downs AONB

There are growing concerns among environmental and countryside groups that AONB status is increasingly under threat from development. The Campaign to Protect Rural England said in July 2006 that many AONBs were under greater threat than ever before. Three particular AONBs were cited: the Dorset AONB threatened by a road plan, the threat of a football stadium in the Sussex Downs AONB, and, larger than any other, a £1 billion plan by Imperial College London to build thousands of houses and offices on hundreds of acres of AONB land on the Kent Downs at Wye. The plan was eventually abandoned in 2006 after sustained local opposition. However, in September 2007 government approval was finally given for the development of a new football ground for Brighton and Hove Albion within the boundaries of the Sussex Downs AONB, after a fierce fight by conservationists. The subsequent development, known as Falmer Stadium, was officially opened in July 2011. The Weymouth Relief Road in Dorset was constructed between 2008 and 2011, after environmental groups lost a High Court challenge to prevent its construction.

Writing in 2006, Professor Adrian Phillips listed threats facing AONBs, which he says include uncertainty over future support for land management, increasing development pressures, the impacts of globalization, and climate change. More subtle threats include creeping suburbanization and horsiculture.

== Celebration ==
Poet Laureate Simon Armitage wrote a poem "Fugitives", commissioned by the National Association of AONBs, which he read on Arnside Knott on 21 September 2019 to launch the celebration of the 70th anniversary of the National Parks and Access to the Countryside Act.

== List of Areas of Outstanding Natural Beauty ==
=== National Landscapes ===
==== England ====
AONB	Photo	Established	Area	Local authorities
Arnside and Silverdale		1972	75 km^{2} (29 sq mi)	Lancashire (Lancaster); Westmorland and Furness
Blackdown Hills		1991	370 km^{2} (140 sq mi)	Devon (East Devon, Mid Devon); Somerset
Cannock Chase		1958	68 km^{2} (26 sq mi)	Staffordshire (Cannock Chase, Lichfield)
Chichester Harbour		1964	37 km^{2} (14 sq mi)	Hampshire (Havant); West Sussex (Chichester)
Chilterns		1965	833 km^{2} (322 sq mi)	Buckinghamshire; Central Bedfordshire; Hertfordshire (Dacorum, North Hertfordshire, Three Rivers); Luton; Oxfordshire (South Oxfordshire)
Cornwall		1959	958 km^{2} (370 sq mi)	Cornwall
Cotswolds		1966	2,038 km^{2} (787 sq mi)	Bath and North East Somerset; Gloucestershire (Cheltenham, Cotswold, Stroud, Tewkesbury); Oxfordshire (Cherwell, West Oxfordshire); South Gloucestershire; Warwickshire (Stratford-on-Avon); Wiltshire; Worcestershire (Wychavon)
Cranborne Chase and West Wiltshire Downs		1981	983 km^{2} (380 sq mi)	Dorset; Hampshire (New Forest); Somerset; Wiltshire
Dedham Vale		1970	90 km^{2} (35 sq mi)	Essex (Colchester, Tendring); Suffolk (Babergh)
Dorset		1959	1,129 km^{2} (436 sq mi)	Dorset
East Devon		1963	268 km^{2} (103 sq mi)	Devon (East Devon)
Forest of Bowland		1964	803 km^{2} (310 sq mi)	Lancashire (Lancaster, Pendle, Ribble Valley, Wyre); North Yorkshire
High Weald		1983	1,460 km^{2} (560 sq mi)	East Sussex (Hastings, Rother, Wealden); Kent (Ashford, Sevenoaks, Tonbridge and Malling, Tunbridge Wells); Surrey (Tandridge); West Sussex (Crawley, Horsham, Mid Sussex)
Howardian Hills		1987	204 km^{2} (79 sq mi)	North Yorkshire
Isle of Wight		1963	189 km^{2} (73 sq mi)	Isle of Wight
Isles of Scilly		1975	16 km^{2} (6.2 sq mi)	Isles of Scilly
Kent Downs		1968	878 km^{2} (339 sq mi)	Greater London (Bromley); Kent (Ashford, Canterbury, Dover, Folkestone & Hythe, Gravesham, Maidstone, Sevenoaks, Swale, Tonbridge and Malling); Medway
Lincolnshire Wolds		1973	560 km^{2} (220 sq mi)	Lincolnshire (East Lindsey, West Lindsey); North East Lincolnshire
Malvern Hills		1959	105 km^{2} (41 sq mi)	Gloucestershire (Forest of Dean); Herefordshire; Worcestershire (Malvern Hills)
Mendip Hills		1972	200 km^{2} (77 sq mi)	Bath and North East Somerset; North Somerset; Somerset
Nidderdale		1994	603 km^{2} (233 sq mi)	North Yorkshire
Norfolk Coast		1968	453 km^{2} (175 sq mi)	Norfolk (Great Yarmouth, King's Lynn and West Norfolk, North Norfolk)
North Devon Coast		1959	171 km^{2} (66 sq mi)	Devon (North Devon, Torridge)
North Pennines		1988	1,983 km^{2} (766 sq mi)	County Durham; Cumberland; Northumberland; North Yorkshire; Westmorland and Furness
Northumberland Coast		1958	138 km^{2} (53 sq mi)	Northumberland
North Wessex Downs		1972	1,730 km^{2} (670 sq mi)	Hampshire (Basingstoke and Deane, Test Valley); Oxfordshire (South Oxfordshire, Vale of White Horse); Swindon; West Berkshire; Wiltshire
Quantock Hills		1956	98 km^{2} (38 sq mi)	Somerset
Shropshire Hills		1958	802 km^{2} (310 sq mi)	Shropshire; Telford and Wrekin
Solway Coast		1964	115 km^{2} (44 sq mi)	Cumberland
South Devon		1960	337 km^{2} (130 sq mi)	Devon (South Hams); Plymouth; Torbay
Suffolk & Essex Coast & Heaths		1970	403 km^{2} (156 sq mi)	Suffolk (Babergh, East Suffolk); Essex (Tendring)
Surrey Hills		1958	422 km^{2} (163 sq mi)	Surrey (Guildford, Mole Valley, Reigate and Banstead, Tandridge, Waverley)
Tamar Valley		1995	190 km^{2} (73 sq mi)	Cornwall; Devon (South Hams, West Devon)
Wye Valley (partly in Wales)		1971	326 km^{2} (126 sq mi)	Gloucestershire (Forest of Dean); Herefordshire; Wales: Monmouthshire
Total			19,035 km^{2} (7,349 sq mi)	

===== Former Areas =====
South Hampshire Coast AONB

The establishment of the New Forest National Park in 2005 meant the subsumption of South Hampshire Coast AONB into it.

East Hampshire AONB and Sussex Downs AONB

East Hampshire and Sussex Downs AONBs were replaced in 2010 by the South Downs National Park.

==== Wales ====
AONB / AHNE	Photo	Established	Area	Local authorities
Anglesey (Ynys Môn)		1967	221 km^{2} (85 sq mi)	Anglesey
Clwydian Range and Dee Valley (Bryniau Clwyd a Dyffryn Dyfrdwy)		1985	389 km^{2} (150 sq mi)	Denbighshire; Flintshire; Wrexham
Gower (Gŵyr)		1956	188 km^{2} (73 sq mi)	Swansea
Llŷn		1956	155 km^{2} (60 sq mi)	Gwynedd
Wye Valley (Dyffryn Gwy) (partly in England)		1971	326 km^{2} (126 sq mi)	Monmouthshire; England: Gloucestershire, Herefordshire

=== Northern Ireland ===
The eight Areas of Outstanding Natural Beauty in Northern Ireland.

AONB	Photo	Established	Area	Local authorities
Antrim Coast and Glens		1988	724 km^{2} (280 sq mi)	Causeway Coast and Glens; Mid and East Antrim
Binevenagh		1966 (as North Derry) (Note: as North Derry AONB, extended and redesignated as Binevenagh AONB in 2006)	138 km^{2} (53 sq mi)	Causeway Coast and Glens
Causeway Coast		1989	42 km^{2} (16 sq mi)	Causeway Coast and Glens
Lagan Valley		1965	39 km^{2} (15 sq mi)	Belfast; Lisburn and Castlereagh
Mourne		1986	570 km^{2} (220 sq mi)	Armagh City, Banbridge and Craigavon; Newry, Mourne and Down
Ring of Gullion		1966 (partially) (Note: redesignated as Ring of Gullion in 1991)	154 km^{2} (59 sq mi)	Newry, Mourne and Down
Sperrin		1968	1,181 km^{2} (456 sq mi)	Causeway Coast and Glens; Derry City and Strabane; Fermanagh and Omagh; Mid Ulster
Strangford and Lecale		2010 (Note: Redesignated in 2010, as a merger of the Lecale Coast AONB, designated in 1967, and the Strangford Lough AONB designated in 1972.)	525 km^{2} (203 sq mi)	Ards and North Down; Newry, Mourne and Down

=== Proposed areas in England ===
The following are formal proposals for new AONBs submitted to Natural England:

- Cambs Ouse Valley
- Churnet Valley
- Forest of Dean
- Herefordshire Marches
- Northants Ironstone Uplands
- Yorkshire Wolds

The 2019 Landscape Review Report additionally favourably mentions proposals not listed in Natural England's list: from Sandstone Ridge and the Vale of Belvoir. The Cheshire Sandstone Ridge was subsequently shortlisted for AONB designation in 2021.

On 8 October 2024, Natural England launched a statutory and public consultation for proposed plans to designate part of the Yorkshire Wolds as an Area of Outstanding Natural Beauty (AONB).

== See also ==
- Conservation in the United Kingdom
- European Landscape Convention
- Landscape-scale conservation
- National parks of England and Wales
- National parks of Northern Ireland
- Areas of Outstanding Natural Beauty in Wales
