= List of shipwrecks in May 1888 =

The list of shipwrecks in May 1888 includes ships sunk, foundered, grounded, or otherwise lost during May 1888.

== 1 May ==
List of shipwrecks: 1 May 1888
Ship	State	Description
Lucinda	United Kingdom	The steamship collided with the steamship Garonne (United Kingdom) and sank in the Red Sea (18°35′N 39°45′E) with the loss of two of her crew. Lucinda was on a voyage from Akyab, Burma to Port Said, Egypt.
Margaret	United Kingdom	The clipper-schooner carrying straw, sank not far from Dover.

== 3 May ==
List of shipwrecks: 3 May 1888
Ship	State	Description
Isabel	United States	The schooner sank in the Shumagin Islands, District of Alaska during a storm. All nineteen members of her crew abandoned ship in eight dories, but twelve of them perished in the boats. Over the month following the sinking, the seven survivors were rescued, the last two from a dory on 4 June by the schooner Kodiak (United States).

== 4 May ==
List of shipwrecks: 4 May 1888
Ship	State	Description
Exmoor	United Kingdom	The steamship foundered in the North Sea off Texel, North Holland, Netherlands. Her crew were rescued by the barque King's County (United Kingdom). Exmoor was on a voyage from Ipswich, Suffolk to Libava, Courland Governorate.

== 5 May ==
List of shipwrecks: 5 May 1888
Ship	State	Description
Penyghent, and Tsar	United Kingdom; Russia	The steamship Penyghent collided with the steamship Tsar and sank in the Black Sea 185 nautical miles (343 km) north of the entrance to the Bosphorus. Her crew were rescued by Tsar. Tsar was severely damaged at the bow. She put back to Odesa.
No. 8	Belgium	The pilot boat, a sloop, collided with the steamship Amethyst (United Kingdom) and sank in the English Channel 4 nautical miles (7.4 km) off Beachy Head, Sussex, United Kingdom. Her six crew survived.

== 6 May ==
List of shipwrecks: 6 May 1888
Ship	State	Description
Benizon, and Eureka	United Kingdom; United States	The steamships collided in the Atlantic Ocean. Eureka sank. Her crew were rescued by Benizon. Benizon was on a voyage from Matanzas, Cuba to Philadelphia, Pennsylvania. She was towed in to Philadelphia severely damaged at the bow.

== 7 May ==
List of shipwrecks: 7 May 1888
Ship	State	Description
Catalonia	United Kingdom	The steamship struck a rock off Mizen Head, County Cork and was damaged. Subsequently repaired and returned to service.
Egyptian Monarch	United Kingdom	The steamship struck a rock in the Isles of Scilly and was damaged. She was on a voyage from New York, United States to London. She put in to Falmouth, Cornwall waterlogged at the bow.

== 8 May ==
List of shipwrecks: 8 May 1888
Ship	State	Description
Electric	United Kingdom	The tug ran aground on Lundy Island, Devon and sank. Her crew were rescued.
Henry Edmunds	United Kingdom	The brigantine was wrecked at Overton, Glamorgan. Her crew survived.
Kirklees	United Kingdom	The steamship ran aground at Breaksea Point, Glamorgan and was damaged. She was on a voyage from Cork to Newport, Monmouthshire. She completed her voyage.

== 9 May ==
List of shipwrecks: 9 May 1888
Ship	State	Description
Boucau	France	The steamship ran aground on Lundy Island, Devon, United Kingdom. She was on a voyage from Cardiff, Glamorgan, United Kingdom to Bayonne, Basses-Pyrénées. She was refloated.
Gerhardine	Germany	The ship was driven ashore and wrecked at the mouth of the Corga, Cape Colony with the loss of two of her crew.
Radnor	United Kingdom	The steamship ran aground on Lundy Island and sank. Her crew survived. She was on a voyage from Cardiff to Galaţi, Romania.

== 10 May ==
List of shipwrecks: 10 May 1888
Ship	State	Description
Amana	United Kingdom	The steamship ran aground at Suez, Egypt. She was on a voyage from Liverpool, Lancashire to Rangoon, Burma.

== 11 May ==
List of shipwrecks: 11 May 1888
Ship	State	Description
Protector	United Kingdom	The ship struck a floating object and foundered in the North Channel between Torr Head, County Antrim and the Mull of Kintyre, Argyllshire. Her crew survived.

== 13 May ==
List of shipwrecks: 13 May 1888
Ship	State	Description
No. 5	United Kingdom	The pilot boat was run down and sunk by the barque Governor (United Kingdom) 2 1/2 nautical miles (4.6 km) south of the Bar Lightship ( Trinity House) with the loss of a pilot.

== 16 May ==
List of shipwrecks: 16 May 1888
Ship	State	Description
Arklow	Canada	The ship was damaged by fire at Cardiff, Glamorgan, United Kingdom.
Christina	Canada	The barque was destroyed by fire in the Atlantic Ocean (45°00′N 8°50′W). Her crew were rescued by a steamship. Christina was on a voyage from Cardiff to Cape Town, Cape Colony.
Melanesia	United Kingdom	The ship was sighted in the Atlantic Ocean (5°48′N 21°44′W) whilst on a voyage from the River Tyne to Valparaíso, Chile. No further trace, reported missing.

== 17 May ==
List of shipwrecks: 17 May 1888
Ship	State	Description
City of Para	Flag unknown	The ship ran aground at Old Providence Island, Colombia. She was on a voyage from Colón, Colombia to New York, United States.
Jeune Hortense	France	The schooner was driven ashore and wrecked at Long Rock, Cornwall. The Penzance Lifeboat, having been brought by carriage to the beach near Marazion, rescued four of her crew.
Otto	Flag unknown	The ship was driven ashore in Mount's Bay, Cornwall. She was salvaged and later was renamed Providence and operated out of Penzance.
Nulli Secundus	Germany	The brigantine was driven ashore in Mount's Bay.

== 18 May ==
List of shipwrecks: 18 May 1888
Ship	State	Description
Emilie	Norway	The barque collided with another vessel off the Wolf Rock, Cornwall, United Kingdom and was severely damaged. She was on a voyage from Jamaica to Goole, Yorkshire, United Kingdom. She put in to Plymouth Soud.

== 21 May ==
List of shipwrecks: 21 May 1888
Ship	State	Description
Albion	United Kingdom	The pilot boat, a lugger, was run down and sunk by a steamship 4 nautical miles (7.4 km) off the Bolt Tail, Devon.

== 23 May ==
List of shipwrecks: 23 May 1888
Ship	State	Description
Paparisetta	Italy	The barque was abandoned in the Indian Ocean 50 nautical miles (93 km) east of East London, Cape Colony. Her crew were rescued by the barquentine Myvanwy (United Kingdom). Paparisetta was on a voyage from Java, Netherlands East Indies to Falmouth, Cornwall, United Kingdom.

== 25 May ==
List of shipwrecks: 25 May 1888
Ship	State	Description
Pactolus	United Kingdom	The ship was driven ashore at Dungeness, Kent. She was on a voyage from Trinidad to London. She was refloated with assistance and resumed her voyage in a leakyn condition.
Zouave	United Kingdom	The full-rigged ship was abandoned at sea. Her thirteen crew were rescued by the full-rigged ship Larnica (United Kingdom). Zouave was on a voyage from Mobile, Alabama to Queenborough, Kent.

== 26 May ==
List of shipwrecks: 26 May 1888
Ship	State	Description
Granit	Norway	The barque sprang a leak and foundered in the South Atlantic. Her crew were rescued by the barque Askoy (Norway). Granit was on a voyage from Marseille, Bouches-du-Rhône, France to Buenos Aires, Argentina.

== 27 May ==
List of shipwrecks: 27 May 1888
Ship	State	Description
Glenorchy	United Kingdom	The ship caught fire at sea. She was on a voyage from Dundee, Forfarshire to Calcutta, India. The fire was extinguished and she completed her voyage.

== 29 May ==
List of shipwrecks: 29 May 1888
Ship	State	Description
Active	United Kingdom	The ketch was run down and sunk off Berry Head, Devon by the full-rigged ship Airlie (United Kingdom). Her crew were rescued by the fishing trawler Latona (United Kingdom). Active was on a voyage from Deptford, Kent to Plymouth, Devon.

== 30 May ==
List of shipwrecks: 30 May 1888
Ship	State	Description
Atlas	Sweden	The steamship was driven ashore in the Great Belt. She was on a voyage from a German port to Horsens.
Long Ditton	United Kingdom	The steamship collided with the steamship Saltwick (United Kingdom) in the Bute Channel and was beached at Cardiff, Glamorgan.
Soleria	United Kingdom	The barque was abandoned at sea. Her crew were rescued by Rewa (United Kingdom).
Teal	United Kingdom	The steamship ran aground in the River Thames at East Greenwich, Middlesex. She was on a voyage from Amsterdam, North Holland, Netherlands to London.

== 31 May ==
List of shipwrecks: 31 May 1888
Ship	State	Description
Chilton	United Kingdom	The steamship ran aground at Marseille, Bouches-du-Rhône, France. She was refloated the next day but consequently foundered.
Maggie McRae	Canada	The schooner foundered in Lake Superior 6 nautical miles (11 km) east of Thunder Cape, Ontarion.
Sailor Prince	United Kingdom	The steamship ran aground at Cardiff, Glamorgan. She was then run into by the steamship Rosslyn (United Kingdom).

== Unknown date ==
List of shipwrecks: Unknown date in May 1888
Ship	State	Description
Aeriel	Denmark	The schooner was driven ashore on Saltholmen. She was on a voyage from Danzig to Hayle, Cornwall, United Kingdom. She was refloated.
Ananda	Sweden	The ship ran aground at Arkö. She was on a voyage from Newcastle upon Tyne, Northumberland, United Kingdom to Norrköping. She was refloated and beached on Gränsö in a waterlogged condition.
City of Bristol	United Kingdom	The steamship caught fire. She was on a voyage from Rotterdam, South Holland, Netherlands to Belfast, County Antrim. The fire was extinguished and she was towed in to Swansea, Glamorgan.
City of Rotterdam	United Kingdom	The steamship ran aground on the Krautzand, in the North Sea.
Dordogne, Dunmail, and Gloamin	Flag unknown United Kingdom; United Kingdom	The steamship Dordogne collided with the steamship Dunmail at Penarth, Glamorgan. She attempted to put in to Penarth, but was run into by the steamship Gloamin and was severely damaged She put in to Cardiff, Glamorgan. Dunmail was severely damaged. Gloamin put in to Penarth.
Dunleary	United Kingdom	The barquentine ran aground and was wrecked in the River Mersey.
Fay	United Kingdom	The schooner caught fire and sank in the North Sea. Her crew were rescued. She was on a voyage from Harburg, Germany to Brest, Finistère, France.
Fratellanza	Italy	The ship was lost in Netherlands East Indies waters. At least some of her crew survived. She was on a voyage from Surabaya, Netherlands East Indies to an English port.
Ganges	United Kingdom	The ship was driven ashore at False Point, India.
Hinricke	Germany	The brig foundered at sea. Her crew were rescued. She was on a voyage from Paysandú, Uruguay to Falmouth, Cornwall.
Jeune St. Vincent	France	The ship was run into by the steamship Springbok (United Kingdom) at Swansea and was severely damaged. Jeune St. Vincent put in to Swansea.
Marie Riebeck	Germany	The barque was destroyed by fire in the Atlantic Ocean. Her crew were rescued by the barque Riga (Norway). Marie Riebeck was on a voyage from Genoa, Italy to a port in California, United States.
Marquis de Mudela	Spain	The steamship was driven ashore. She was refloated and taken in to Ferrol in a leaky condition.
Minstrel King	United Kingdom	The barque was abandoned in the Atlantic Ocean. Her crew were rescued by the steamship Teutonia (Germany).
Normandy	United Kingdom	The steamship ran aground at Las Palmas, Canary Islands. She was on a voyage from London to Madagascar. She was refloated and found to be leaky.
Prins Frederick	Netherlands	The steamship was driven ashore. She was later refloated and towed in to Gibraltar.
Raffaele Ligure	Italy	The barque ran aground on the Longsand, in the North Sea off the coast of Essex, United Kingdom. She was abandoned the next day and became a wreck.
Regulus	United Kingdom	The steamship was driven ashore at Poti, Austria-Hungary.
Robilant	Italy	The steamship was damaged by fire at Norfolk, Virginia, United States.
Stockholm	Sweden	The steamship ran aground in the Elbe at Schulauw, Germany. She was on a voyage from Stockholm to Hamburg, Germany.
Tiger	United Kingdom	The steamship ran aground in the Elbe at Schulauw. She was on a voyage from Hull, Yorkshire to Hamburg.
W. H. White	United States	The ship was abandoned in the Atlantic Ocean before 20 May.
Many unnamed vessels	France	Between 30 and 35 fishing vessels were wrecked on the coast of Iceland with the loss of about 400 lives.
