= Tí Chulainn =

Cultural, events and accommodation center

Coordinates: 54.11339°N 6.46387°W

Tí Chulainn is a cultural, events and accommodation centre located in Mullaghbawn (Mullaghbann, Mullaghbane, An Mullach Bán) in South Armagh, in Northern Ireland. The centre is maintained by a not-for-profit local community group, Tí Chulainn Limited. The centre opened in 1999.

Tí Chulainn has 16 en-suite bedrooms, conference facilities, a 70-seater audio visual theatre, and a large performance area. It has hosted several exhibitions. In 2006, Evelyn Glenholmes, who had been the subject of an unsuccessful extradition proceeding, was scheduled to speak at the centre.

The centre has facilities to cater for disabled patrons in the main centre and accommodation block. The building was designed by Mackel & Doherty Architects.

The South Armagh Genealogy Project is housed within Tí Chulainn, with microfiche record and census details, as is the Cuimhneamh project which aims to provide an extensive and ongoing archive of people's memories and experiences during recent history from the early 20th century to the present day, through audio/visual interviews, combined with documents and photographs.
