= Tom Mannion =

Scottish actor

Tom Mannion is a Scottish actor. He was trained at the Royal Scottish Academy of Music and Drama in Glasgow.

His television credits include Brookside, Up the Garden Path, The Bill, Boon, Cadfael, Doctor Finlay, Doctors, Eleventh Hour, Holby City, Roman Mysteries, Hustle, Life on Mars, Midsomer Murders, New Tricks, Red Cap, Secret Diary of a Call Girl, Spatz, Taggart, The Agatha Christie Hour, The Chief, The Royal, and Wycliffe. He has recently been in the BBC TV series Lip Service, Moving On and Inside Men. In 2016, he starred in Mr Selfridge.

His film credits include Brothers, Beyond the Sea, Iris, Beautiful Creatures and Croupier as Detective Inspector Ross.

In 2011–12, he went on tour throughout the UK, playing Inspector Goole, in Stephen Daldry's production of An Inspector Calls.

In December 2012 he joined the cast of Emmerdale as horse trainer Steve Harland. He made his final appearance in the soap on 11 September 2013.

== Filmography ==
- That Sinking Feeling (1979) – The Doctor
- The Agatha Christie Hour (1982) – Herbert
- Return of the Jedi (1983) – Star Destroyer Captain #2
- Croupier (1998) – Ross
- Beautiful Creatures (2000) – Brian McMinn
- Iris (2001) – Neurologist
- Brothers (2004) – Miles
- Beyond the Sea (2004) – Movie Set Reporter
- Centurion (2010) – General Tesio
- F (2010) – Gary
- Waterboys (2016) – James The Victim 2019

== Selected theatre ==
Year	Title	Role	Company	Director |	Notes
1988	American Bagpipes	Patrick Nauldie	Royal Exchange, Manchester	Casper Wrede	World premiere of a play by Iain Heggie
1996	The Philadelphia Story	Dexter Haven	Royal Exchange, Manchester	Josephine Abady	play by Philip Barry
1996	Cyrano de Bergerac	Cyrano de Bergerac	Communicado, with Lyceum Theatre, Edinburgh	Gerry Mulgrew and Andy Farrell	translation by Edwin Morgan
1998	An Experiment with an Air Pump	Thomas Armstrong	Royal Exchange, Manchester	Matthew Lloyd	World premiere of a play by Shelagh Stephenson
2005	Antony and Cleopatra	Antony	Royal Exchange, Manchester	Braham Murray	
