= Meigh =

Village in County Armagh, Northern Ireland

Coordinates: 54°07′N 6°23′W

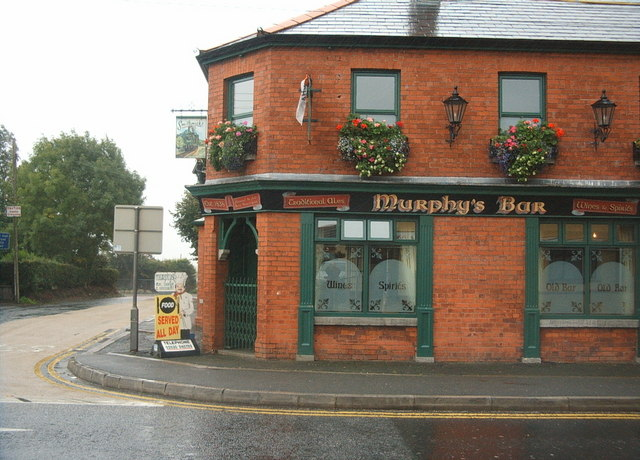
Murphy's Bar in the middle of Meigh

Meigh (from Irish Máigh/an Mhaigh, meaning 'the plain') is a small village and townland near Slieve Gullion in County Armagh, Northern Ireland. It had a population of 444 people in the 2001 Census. It lies within the Newry, Mourne and Down District Council area.

== Geography ==
Meigh lies within the Ring of Gullion area of natural beauty, about 7 km southwest of Newry. Nearby villages include Camlough, Dromintee and Jonesborough. Meigh is close to the border between Northern Ireland and the Republic of Ireland.

== History ==
Meigh began as a cluster of buildings around the crossroads formed by Drumintee Road, Newry Road, Chapel Road and Railway Road.

Meigh, along with the rest of South Armagh, would have been transferred to the Irish Free State had the recommendations of the Irish Boundary Commission been enacted in 1925.

In the 2000s, many new houses and businesses were built.

== Places of interest ==
Slieve Gullion Forest Park

Slieve Gullion Forest Park comprises a courtyard with a large garden and galleries. A mountain trail, suitable for cars and other transport, winds for eight miles throughout the park. The peak of the trail, at 3880 ft, contains megalithic cairns and a lake, with views of the Ring of Gullion, Mourne Mountains and Cooley Mountains.

Teach Mallon Creative Arts

The Slieve Gullion Creative Arts Centre, Teach Mallon, is an attempt to relive and recapture the historic lore of this part of South Armagh. It hosts music events, serious sessions, storytellings and other concerts.

Bell's Castle

Built in the 19th century from stones taken from the Clonlum Court Tomb, the castle is surrounded by both arable land and mountainous terrain. The castle's lore includes stories of ghosts and other paranormal manifestations.
