= Beautiful Creatures (2000 film) =

2000 film by Bill Eagles

- Theatrical release poster
- Directed by: Bill Eagles
- Written by: Simon Donald
- Produced by: Simon Donald
- Starring: Rachel Weisz; Susan Lynch; Iain Glen; Maurice Roëves; Tom Mannion; Alex Norton
- Cinematography: James Welland
- Edited by: Jon Gregory; David Head
- Music by: Murray Gold
- Production company: DNA Films
- Distributed by: Universal Pictures International (through United International Pictures)
- Release date: 23 August 2000 (EIFF)
- Running time: 86 min
- Country: United Kingdom
- Languages: English; German

Beautiful Creatures is a 2000 British crime film directed by Bill Eagles and starring Susan Lynch and Rachel Weisz. Lynch received a British Independent Film Award nomination for her role.

== Plot ==
Two women are thrown together when one accidentally kills the other's boyfriend while attempting to stop a public beating. They attempt to rob the dead man's wealthy brother with a ransom scam, but when a corrupt detective gets involved things go awry.

== Cast ==
- Rachel Weisz as Petula
- Susan Lynch as Dorothy
- Iain Glen as Tony
- Tom Mannion as Brian McMinn
- Maurice Roëves as Ronnie McMinn
- Alex Norton as Detective Inspector Hepburn
- Jake D'Arcy as Train Guard
- Juliet Cadzow as Mother on Beach

== Reception ==
On Rotten Tomatoes the film has an approval rating of 38% based on reviews from 60 critics. The website's critics consensus reads, "Implausible, uneven, and gratuitously violent, this esotrogen-powered crime caper lacks the finesse of Thelma and Louise or Guy Ritchie's work." On Metacritic it has a score of 40% based on reviews from 22 critics, indicating "mixed or average reviews".

Roger Ebert of the Chicago Sun-Times gave the film 1.5 out of 4 and wrote: "There is some dark humor in the movie, of the kind where you laugh that you may not gag."
