= Corrinshego =

Townland in County Armagh, Northern Ireland

Corrinshego Cor fhuinnseoige
- Townland
- Etymology: Ash-tree hill
- Location within island of Ireland
- Coordinates: 54°10′19″N 6°22′44″W
- Irish Grid Reference: J059260
- Country: Northern Ireland
- Province: Ulster
- County: Armagh
- Barony: Orior Lower

Area
  - Total: 160 km^{2} (62 sq mi)
- Highest elevation: 333 m (1,093 ft)
- Lowest elevation: 91 m (300 ft)
- Time zone: UTC+0 (WET)
  - Summer (DST): UTC+1 (IST)
- Postcode: BT35 7LU & BT35 8PR

Corrinshego (from Irish Cor-fhuinnseoige 'ash-tree hill') is a townland in the Parish of Middle Killeavy, County Armagh, Northern Ireland. It lies 1.6 km (1 mile) to the west of Newry in the Newry, Mourne and Down District Council area.

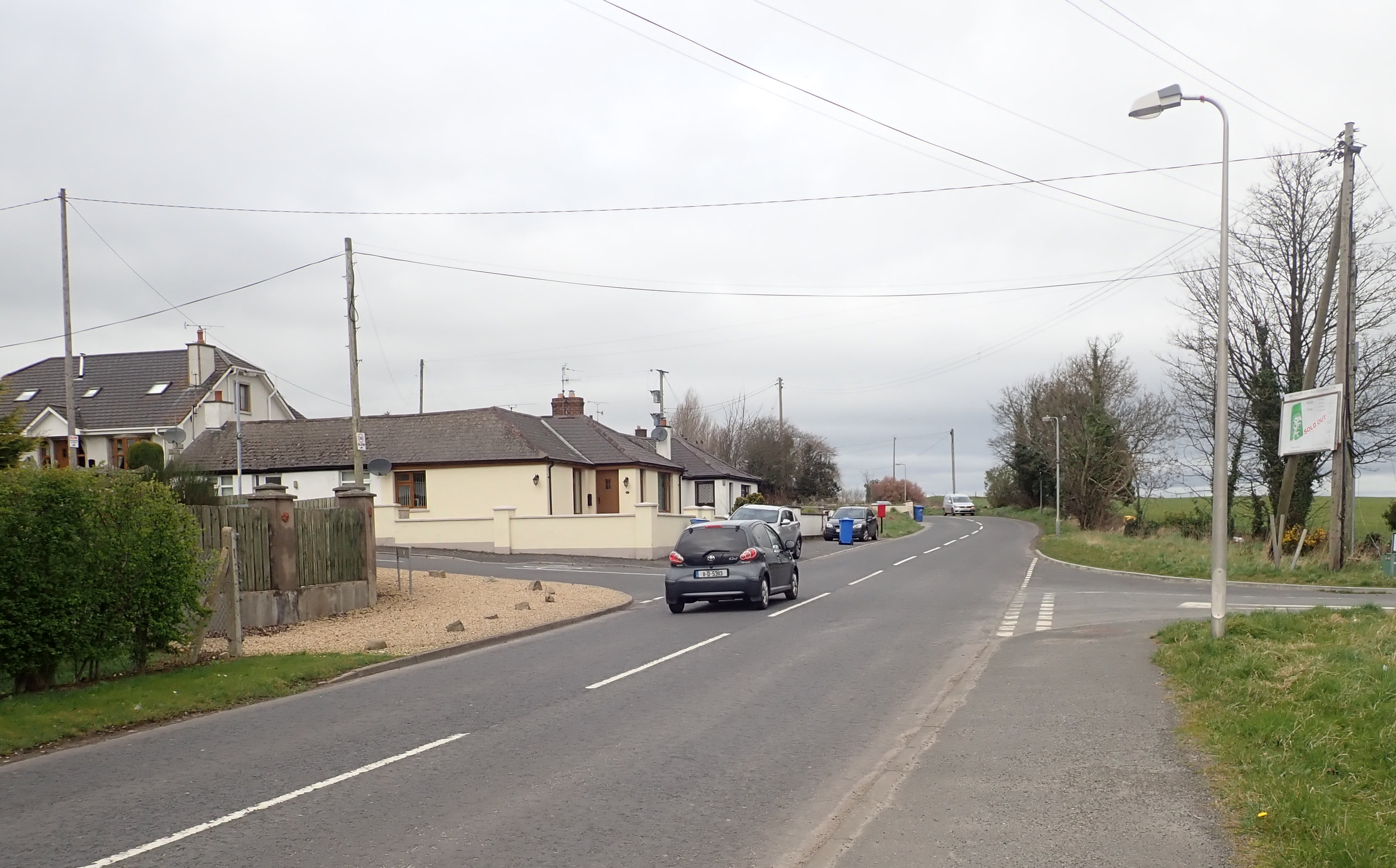
Corrinshego crossroads

Corrinshego stretches steeply up Camlough Mountain almost to the summit, with all of the area south of the Carrivekeeney Road inside the Ring of Gullion Area of Outstanding Natural Beauty.

== History ==
Following the suppression of Cahir O'Doherty's Rebellion in 1608, the lands around Corrinshego were granted to Sir Oliver St John. The area remained in the possession of the St John family until it passed to Robert Sparrow, an English Member of Parliament and barrister. Through marriage, the land later came into the ownership of the Dukes of Manchester.

The Chancellors Road, which runs through Corrinshego to Carrivemaclone, was constructed in the early 19th century by Isaac Corry, reportedly to avoid passing through Newry.

On 23 June 1808, a detachment of yeomanry attacked attendees at a St John's Eve bonfire in Corrinshego, killing one man and injuring several others. The incident caused outrage among the magistrates of Newry. Although one arrest was made, the detainee was freed when a crowd attacked the house in which he was being held.

In September 1881, a number of evictions in the area led to the establishment of a local branch of the Irish National Land League. The branch was formed just a week prior to the organisation's national suppression.

In the early 20th century, land in Corrinshego was sold by the 9th Duke of Manchester to the tenants, with negotiations concluding in 1904 and the sale completed in 1909.

A Sinn Féin club named after Thomas Davis was established in Corrinshego in 1905 and was among the earliest such clubs in Ireland.

During the late 1900s and early 1910s, Corrinshego was frequently mentioned in the local press as a location where cock-fights were held.

The Corrinshego Company of the Irish Republican Army was part of the Newry Brigade of the Fourth Northern Division. In November 1920, volunteers from the company took part in the attacks on Camlough Royal Irish Constabulary barracks and the Egyptian Arch Ambush.

== Sports ==
The local GAA club is Thomas Davis GFC, Corrinshego.

== Notable people ==
- John Lynch – Actor, novelist
- Susan Lynch – Actress
- Leah O'Rourke – Actress
