= Torr Head =

Headland in Northern Ireland

- Cionn an Tor
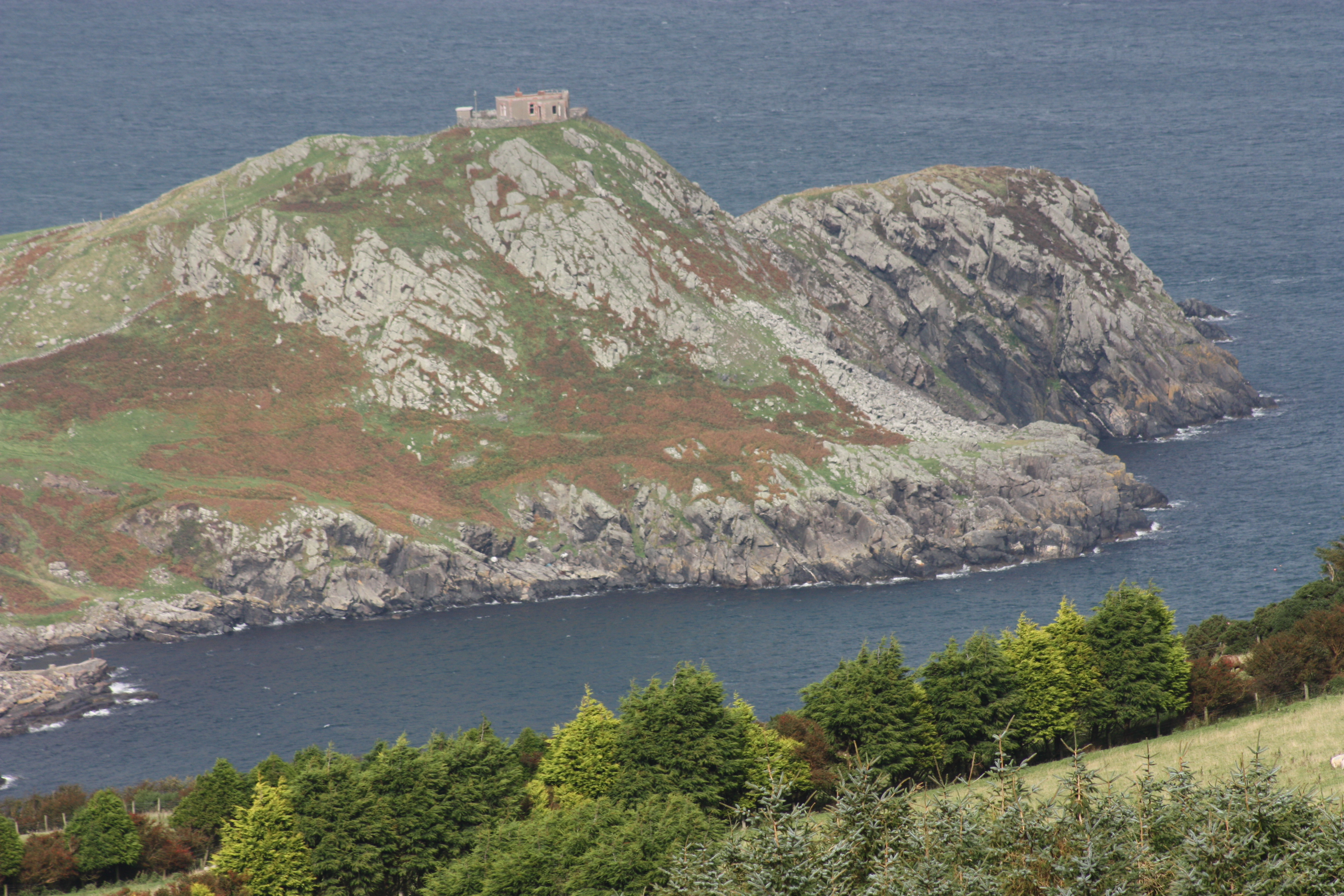
- View from the southwest

Highest point
- Elevation: 67 metres (220 ft)
- Coordinates: 55.1974°N 6.0627°W

Geography
- Location within Northern Ireland
- Country: Northern Ireland
- County: Antrim
- Civil parish: Culfeightrin
- OSI/OSNI grid: D234 406

Climbing
- Easiest route: hike

Torr Head, also known as Tor(r) Point (Irish: Cionn an Toir, ‘headland of the tor/pinnacle’), is a headland on the coast of the Straits of Moyle, in the civil parish of Culfeightrin, County Antrim, Northern Ireland. The Irish Grid reference is D 234 406.

== Geography ==
Torr Head lies about 8 miles (12 km) east of Ballycastle and 5 miles (8 km) north of Cushendun on the coast of the North Channel, opposite the Mull of Kintyre and within the Antrim Coast and Glens AONB. A link section of the Ulster Way passes about 0.6 miles (1 km) southwest. Torr Head is Northern Ireland's closest point to Scotland. A rocky hill rises to a height of about 67 m. The boundary between the townlands of Torr West and Torr East bisects the headland; its northern part is made up by the peninsula of Cargismore.

Torr Head Harbour, also called Portaleen Harbour, is located immediately south of Torr Head in Portaleen Bay. It is home to a fishery station which is in use during salmon migration time. A migratory route of cod also passes close by Torr Head.

A ridge of Dalradian rocks stretches from Torr Head to the southwest and is overlain by limestone from the Argyll group.

== History ==
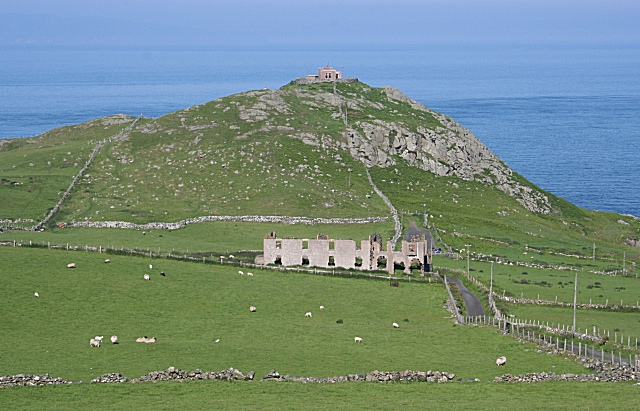
Ruins of the coast guard quarters and the signal station at Torr Head

The name of the headland is probably derived from the Celtic word "tor" for a rocky height.

Torr Head was the site of the hill fort (cashel) of Dún Bharraigh, which according to legend was the residence of Barach the Great, known from the legend of Deirdre of the Sorrows. The fort was destroyed after 1818 when the coastguard station was built.

A signal station was erected in 1822 on top of Torr Head by Lloyd's. On behalf of the latter, and as there had been no means of exchanging information on passing ships between here and Rathlin East lighthouse, George Kemp and Guglielmo Marconi performed experiments in radio communication between Ballycastle and Rathlin in summer 1898.

The nearby coastguard quarters were raided on 11 September 1920 and destroyed on 6 November 1920 during the Irish War of Independence. The signalling station was abandoned in the 1920s. Both buildings are in ruins now.
