= Mullaghbawn =

Village in County Armagh, Northern Ireland

Mullaghbawn: Irish: an Mullach Bán
- Mullaghbawn Folk Museum

- Location within Northern Ireland
- Population: 642 (2021)
- Irish grid reference: H995191
- District: Newry & Mourne
- County: County Armagh
- Country: Northern Ireland
- Sovereign state: United Kingdom
- Post town: NEWRY
- Postcode district: BT35
- Dialling code: 028, +44 28
- UK Parliament: Newry & Armagh
- NI Assembly: Newry & Armagh

Mullaghbawn (/mʌləˈbɔːn/ mul-ə-BAWN or /mʌləˈbɑːn/ mul-ə-BAHN; from Irish an Mullach Bán, meaning 'the white hilltop'), or Mullaghbane, is a small village and townland near Slieve Gullion in County Armagh, Northern Ireland. In the 2011 Census it had a population of 596. At the 2021 Census this had risen to 642.

== History ==
A barracks was built near Mullaghbawn in 1689 and was known as Shanroe Barracks. The building was a small outpost build to help to suppress the activities of the rapparees and eventually abandoned in 1750. Forkill rectory was built in 1775 in the townland of Shanroe nearer the village of Mullaghbane. This meant that the rector had to travel almost two miles from his home to his church in Forkhill on foot or on horseback. The outbreak of sectarian violence between the Peep o' Day Boys and the Catholic Defenders in the Mulllaghbane and Forkill areas in the 1780s and early 1790s meant that a new barracks was required to house a company of foot soldiers. Belmont Barracks was later built overlooking the site of the rectory in 1795. The Forkhill Yeomanry was formed when the barracks was opened. By 1821 Belmont Barracks had become obsolete and was sold. The main barracks building remains is currently two private homes. The rectory ceased to be occupied by 1920 and was burned by the local IRA in 1922 before it was to be taken over by British forces. The remains of the Rectory's ruined gatehouse is still standing along a laneway to the right on the road from the village to Belmont.

Mullaghbawn, along with the rest of South Armagh, would have been transferred to the Irish Free State had the recommendations of the Irish Boundary Commission been enacted in 1925.

== Places of interest ==
- The community centre
- Near Mullaghbawn, in Killeavy there is a ruined church with the grave of Saint Moninne (a local saint) in its churchyard.
- Ballykeel Dolmen is near Mullaghbawn at the western foot of Slieve Gullion. It is an outstanding example of a portal tomb. It is made up of two portal stones with a sill between and a lower backstone supporting a huge capstone.
- Cashel Lake, a group of lakes on the outskirts of Mullaghbawn.
- The South Armagh Memorial Garden in Mullaghbawn, created in 2010, commemorates 24 Provisional IRA volunteers who died during the Troubles.

== Culture and sport ==
Mullaghbawn Folk Museum is a traditional two-roomed thatched farmhouse and outbuildings, restored by the Mullaghbawn Historical Group during the 1970s and filled with artefacts depicting the lifestyles of the people of the Ring of Gullion in the last century.

Tí Chulainn is a cultural heritage centre, with accommodation and function rooms, set at the bottom of Slieve Gullion.

The local GAA club is Mullaghbawn Cúchullain's GFC (Cumann Chú Chullain, An Mullach Bán).

== People ==
- Len Graham, Irish traditional singer and song collector, lives in the village with his wife Pádraigín Ní Uallacháin, also a singer.
- Paddy O'Hanlon (1944–2009), Northern Ireland Civil Rights Association (NICRA) activist and nationalist politician; born in Drogheda to parents from Mullaghbawn, he lived most of his life in Mullaghbawn.
- Dr Rory O'Hanlon (1934–2026), medical doctor who is a former Fianna Fáil politician and a former minister in the Irish Government. He was born in Dublin to Mick O'Hanlon from Mullaghbawn; Rory later attended Mullaghbawn Primary School, before going on to board at Blackrock College. He was a first-cousin of Paddy O'Hanlon. Rory was a long-serving Carrickmacross-based TD for the Cavan-Monaghan constituency. His son is Ardal O'Hanlon.

== Neighbouring townlands ==
- Aughanduff
- Carrickaldreen
- Carrive
- Lathbirget
- Lislea
- Shanroe
- Tullymacrieve

== Links ==
- Mullaghbawn Folk Museum

54°06′N 6°29′W
