= Antrim Coast and Glens =

Area of County Antrim, Northern Ireland

- IUCN category V (protected landscape/seascape)
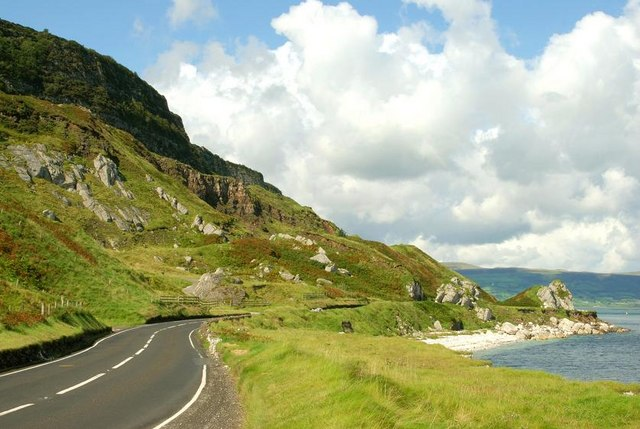
- The Antrim coast road near Glenarm

- Map of the AONB in Northern Ireland
- Interactive map of Antrim Coast and Glens
- Location: County Antrim, Northern Ireland
- Nearest town: Ballycastle, Ballymena, Larne
- Coordinates: 55.0°N 6.1°W
- Area: 72,489 ha (279.88 sq mi)
- Designation: Area of Outstanding Natural Beauty
- Established: 1988
- Named for: County Antrim coastline and Glens of Antrim
- Governing body: Causeway Coast & Glens Heritage Trust
- Website: antrimcoastandglensaonb.ccght.org

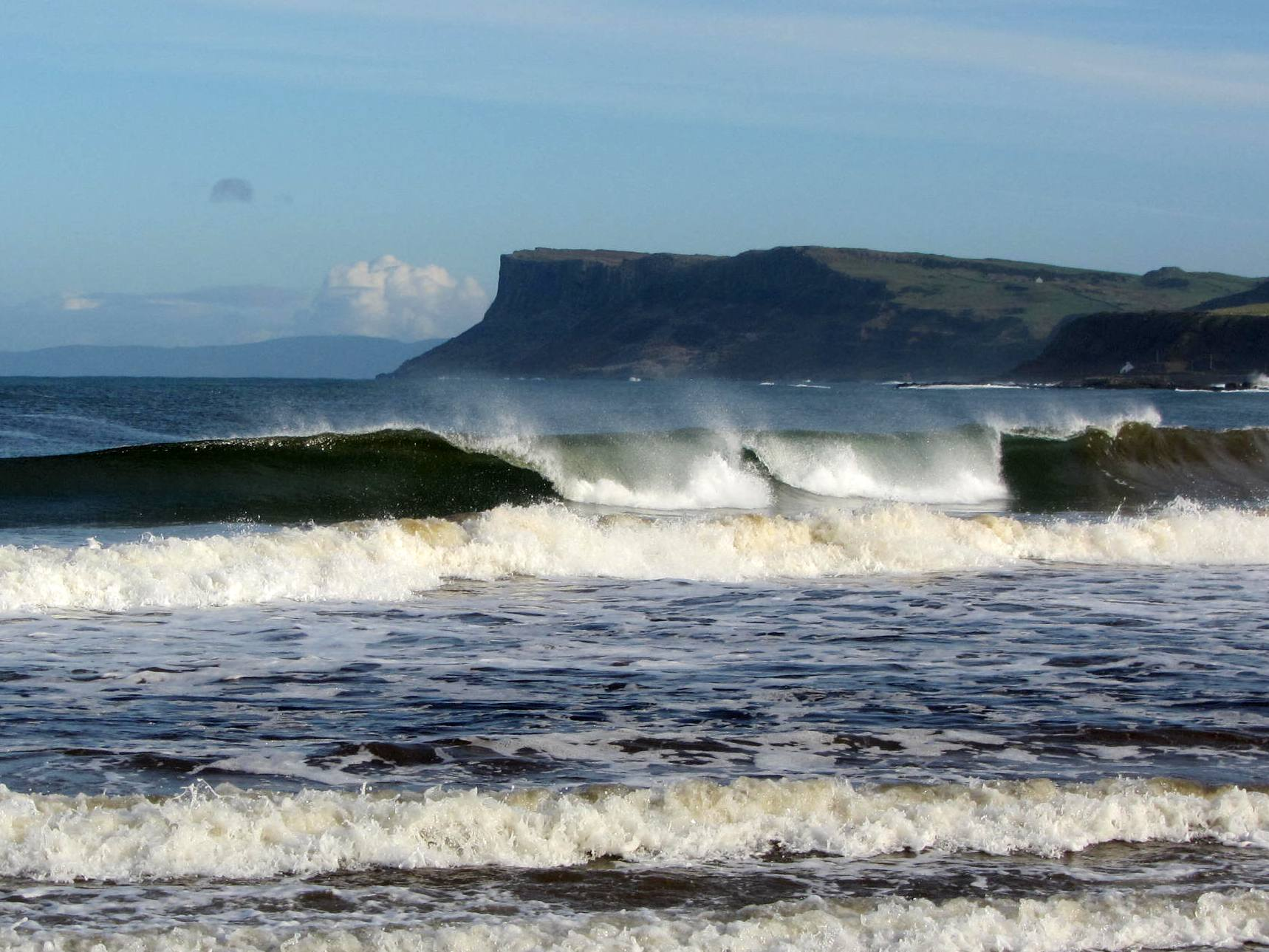
Breakers on Antrim Coast near Ballycastle, Northern Ireland, with cliffs of Fair Head. Scotland appears in the distance on clear days.

The Antrim Coast and Glens is an area of County Antrim in Northern Ireland, designated as an Area of Outstanding Natural Beauty in 1988.

== Description ==
The Antrim Coasts and Glens AONB extends to include Rathlin Island, the Glens of Antrim and the coastal area between Larne and Ballycastle, and is dominated by the Antrim Plateau which is 500 metres (1,600 ft) at its highest point. This plateau is incised by rapidly flowing rivers into a series of glens which run eastwards and north-eastwards into the sea. The coastline within the AONB includes the only inhabited offshore island in Ireland, dramatic headlands and bays, farmland and, in the uplands, open expanses of moorland. There is a long history of human activity in the areas and has many important archaeological sites, listed buildings, historic monuments and conservation areas. It has a rich culture with close links to Scotland, the Mull of Kintyre is only 20 kilometres (12 miles) from Torr Head. The AONB covers an area of 70,600 hectares (174,000 acres).

== Geology ==
The oldest rocks in the AONB are the schists exposed in its northwest which are 300 million years old. Elsewhere these are overlain by a varied geology which includes both igneous and sedimentary rocks and the colours and features these rocks give to the landscape are reflected in many local place names such as red Bay, Blackcave and Whitebay. The most recent force to shape the landscape were the glaciations, the last of which ended around 17,000 years before the present. The ice has moulded the landscape in the AONB, leaving scars in the rocks and scouring out hollows which have filled with water to create small loughs and bogs.

== Natural history ==
There are a number of habitats within the AONB, the largest area is the open landscape of the Antrim Plateau. This is partially covered with blanket bog and is home to ground nesting birds of open country like red grouse and hen harrier. It also provides habitat for a number of rare plants, for example the insectivorous butterwort. The varied coastline is important to wildlife too, including aquatic mammals such as cetaceans, seals and the odd otter. Rathlin Island is an important site for breeding seabirds and in the breeding season 250,000 of them come to the island, these include species such as razorbill, kittiwake and puffin. The coastline is also important for its invertebrate fauna, including rare sponges. The woodlands and fields provide homes to a variety of species and these include mammals, insects and wild flowers.

== Cultural heritage ==
The area's links with Scotland are reflected in the culture and the ancient kingdom of Dalriada covered north eastern Ireland and parts of western Scotland, its kings eventually becoming the kings of the Kingdom of Scotland. Later the area was fought over by a number of Irish clans while Glenarm Castle has been the seat of the McDonnell Clan for 400 years. It is home to a rich mythology and, especially in the middle part to traditional Irish pursuits such as hurling. Today the area has a working landscape of farms and fishing villages.

== See also ==
- A2 road (Northern Ireland)
- Belfast-Larne railway line
- Belfast-Derry railway line
- Coleraine-Portrush railway line
