= Susan Lynch =

Northern Irish actress (born 1971)

- Born: 1971 (age 54–55); Corrinshego, County Armagh, Northern Ireland
- Education: Royal Central School of Speech and Drama
- Occupation: Actress
- Years active: 1991–present
- Spouse(s): Craig Parkinson (m. 20??; sep. 2019)
- Relatives: John Lynch (brother); Leah O'Rourke (niece)

Susan Lynch (born 1971) is an actress from Northern Ireland. She is known for her role in the 2003 film 16 Years of Alcohol. Her other film appearances include Waking Ned Devine (1998), Nora (2000), Beautiful Creatures (2000), and From Hell (2001). In 2020, she was listed as number 42 on The Irish Times list of Ireland's greatest film actors.

== Early life and education ==
Lynch was born in 1971 in Corrinshego, County Armagh, Northern Ireland to an Italian mother (from Trivento) and an Irish father. She has four siblings; her eldest brother is actor John Lynch.

She trained at the Central School of Speech and Drama.

== Career ==
In August 2004, she starred in The Night Season at the Royal National Theatre in London. In 2008, she was one of the leads in The Last Days of Judas Iscariot at the Almeida Theatre.

Her film roles include Beautiful Creatures (2000), Waking Ned (1998), Ready Player One (2018), and the title role in Nora (2000), about Nora Barnacle the wife of James Joyce.

Lynch played Alison Garrs in Happy Valley. The programme's creator and writer, Sally Wainwright, wrote the part of Alison Garrs with Lynch in mind.

== Personal life ==
Lynch and her husband, actor Craig Parkinson, lived in Painswick, Gloucestershire in 2016. The couple separated in 2019.

== Awards and recognition ==
Lynch has won three Irish Film and Television Academy Awards, including Best Leading Actress for her work in the film Nora, about Nora Barnacle and her husband, Irish author James Joyce.

She also won the British Independent Film Award for Best Supporting Actress for the 2003 film 16 Years of Alcohol.

In 2020, she was listed as number 42 on The Irish Times list of Ireland's greatest film actors.

== Filmography ==
=== Film ===
Key
†	Denotes films that have not yet been released

Year	Title	Role	Notes
1994	The Secret of Roan Inish	Selkie	
1994	Interview with the Vampire	Paris Vampire	
1997	Downtime	Chrissy	
1998	Waking Ned	Maggie O'Toole	Titled: Waking Ned Devine in North America; Nominated — Screen Actors Guild Award for Outstanding Performance by a Cast in a Motion Picture
1999	Deceit	Corinna	Original Italian title: Il gloco
2000	Nora	Nora Barnacle	IFTA Award for Best Actress
2000	Beautiful Creatures	Dorothy	Nominated — British Independent Film Award for Best Actress
2001	Happy Now?	Tina Trent	
2001	From Hell	Liz Stride	
2001	Morlang	Ann Morlang	
2001	Dumping Elaine	Beth	Short film
2001	Mapmaker	Jane Bates	Nominated — IFTA Award for Best Actress in a Feature Film
2002	Jedermanns Fest	Maria	
2003	16 Years of Alcohol	Mary	British Independent Film Award for Best Supporting Actress; IFTA Award for Best Supporting Actress
2003	Casa de los babys	Eileen	
2003	Bye-Child	Woman	Short film
2003	Red Roses and Petrol	Catherine Doyle	
2003	School of Life	Teacher (Miss Given)	Short film British Independent Film Award for Best British Short Film (2004)
2004	Mickybo and Me	Torch Woman	
2004	Enduring Love	Rachel	
2005	Duane Hopwood	Gina	
2006	A Woman in Winter	Marianne	
2006	Someone Else	Lisa	
2007	Elizabeth: The Golden Age	Annette Fleming	
2009	City Rats	Gina	
2009	Holy Water	Geraldine Gaffney	Also known as Hard Times
2009	The Race	Katey Kensay	
2009	The Scouting Book for Boys	Sharon	
2010	Capture Anthologies: Love, Lust and Tragedy	Woman	Direct-to-video. Segment: Bye-Child (2003)
2011	Hideaways	Mrs. O'Mara	
2011	Stop the World	Susan	Short film
2014	Here and Now	Lucy	
2015	Cleaned	Helen (Nurse)	Short film
2016	Away	Angie	
2016	The Secret Scripture	Nurse Caitlin	
2017	Bad Day for the Cut	Frankie Pierce	
2018	Ready Player One	Aunt Alice	
2018	Dead to the World	Emily Tennison	Short film
2019	Downton Abbey	Miss Lawton	
2019	The Bookshop	–	Short film. Writer and director
2020	Here Are the Young Men	Lynn Connolly	
2020	Cold Blow Lane	Mademoiselle	
2023	A Woman's Face	–	Short film. Writer and director
2024	Bring Them Down	Peggy	
TBA	The Big Fix †		Filming

=== Television ===
Year	Title	Role	Notes
1991	The Bill	Trainee Investigator	Series 7; episode 68: "Six of One"
1992	Screen One	Receptionist 2	Series 4; episode 6: "Running Late"
1993	Cracker	Tina Brien	Series 1; episodes 3–5: "To Say I Love You: Parts 1–3"
1995	Dangerous Lady	Maura Ryan	Mini-series; episodes 1–4
1995	The Perfect Match	Erica	Television film
1996	A Royal Scandal	Caroline of Brunswick	Television film
1996	Screen One	Mel	Series 8; episode 2: "Truth or Dare"
1997	Ivanhoe	Rebecca	Mini-series; episodes 1–6: "Parts One to Six"
1998	Amongst Women	Maggie	Mini-series; episodes 1–4
1998	Kings in Grass Castles	Sarah	Mini-series; episodes 1 & 2
2001	Sweet Revenge	Madeleine	Mini-series; episodes 1 & 2
2002	Any Time Now	Stevie McCutcheon	Episodes 1, 3, 4 & 6 IFTA Award for Best Actress in a Television Drama
2004	Bodies	Maria Orton	Series 1; episodes 1–6; Nominated – IFTA Award for Best Supporting Actress in Film/TV
2005	Dalziel and Pascoe	Dr. Janet Rix	Series 9; episodes 5 & 6: "The Dig: Parts 1 & 2"
2006	The Ten Commandments	Miriam	Mini-series; episodes 1 & 2: "Parts 1 & 2"
2006	Soundproof	Penny	Television film Nominated – RTS Television Award for Best Actress
2007	The Robber Bride	Charis White	Television film
2009	The Unloved	Lucy's Mother	Television film
2010	The Secret Diaries of Miss Anne Lister	Isabella 'Tib' Norcliffe	Television film
2010	Agatha Christie's Marple	Sybil Stamfordis	Series 5; episode 1: "The Pale Horse"
2010	Moving On	Tina	Series 2; episode 4: "Malaise"
2011	New Tricks	Claudia Scott	Series 8; episode 5: "Moving Target"
2011	Great Expectations	Molly	Mini-series; episodes 2 & 3
2011–2012	Monroe	Anna Monroe	Series 1 & 2; 12 episodes
2012	The Secret of Crickley Hall	Lili Peel	Mini-series; episodes 2 & 3
2013	Ambassadors	Caitlin	Mini-series; episodes 1–3
2014	Common	Margaret Ward	Television film
2014	Chasing Shadows	Dr. Ellesmere	Mini-series; episodes 3 & 4: "Off Radar: Parts 1 & 2"
2016	National Treasure	Christina Farnborough	Mini-series; episodes 2 & 4
2016, 2023	Happy Valley	Alison Garrs	Series 2 & 3; 7 episodes
2017	Apple Tree Yard	Susannah	Mini-series; episodes 1–4
2018	Killing Eve	Anna	Series 1; episodes 7 & 8: "I Don't Want to Be Free" & "God, I'm Tired"
2018	Doctor Who	Angstrom	Series 11; episode 2: "The Ghost Monument"
2018–2020	Save Me	Stace	Series 1 & 2; 11 episodes
2019	Ups and Downs	Fionnula	Television film
2019	Wild Bill	Angie	Mini-series; episode 1: "Welcome to Boston"
2020	Sex Education	Tara Gibbs	Series 2; episode 3
2021	Bloodlands	DCI Heather Pentland	Series 1; episode 4: "Goliath"
2021	Unforgotten	DCC Liz Baildon	Series 4; episodes 1–6
2021	Close to Me	Cathy	Mini-series; episodes 1, 2, 4 & 5
2022	Pistol	John's Mum	Mini-series; episode 5: "Track 5: Nancy and Sid"
2023	Northern Lights	Pauline	Episodes 1–6
2023–2025	The Change	Agnes	Series 1 & 2; 12 episodes
2024	Daddy Issues	Davina	Episodes 1 & 6: "Happy Tears" & "Sadie"
2025	A Thousand Blows	Jane Carr	Series 1; episodes 3, 5 & 6
2025	Small Town, Big Story	Jemima Rowland	Episodes 4 & 6: "An Dobhar Who?" & "The Turd Man"
2026	The Marlow Murder Club	Isla De Souza	2 episodes
