= Julian Glover (journalist) =

English journalist and speechwriter

Julian Glover OBE is an English journalist and speechwriter who is Associate Editor of the London Evening Standard. He previously served as a special adviser in the Department for Transport. Before this, as was announced on 7 October 2011, he became the chief speechwriter to the Conservative prime minister, David Cameron. Glover wrote for The Guardian from 2001 to 2011 as a leader-writer and columnist.

Glover has written a biography of Thomas Telford: Man of Iron: Thomas Telford and the Building of Britain (2017, Bloomsbury, ISBN 978-1408837467).

Glover has been the civil partner of Times columnist and former Conservative MP Matthew Parris since 2006.

Glover chaired a review of English National Parks and Areas of Outstanding Natural Beauty which produced a report in September 2019, titled Landscapes Review and also known as the Designated Landscapes Review and the Glover Review. The Guardian summarised the report as "National parks and areas of outstanding natural beauty have not done enough to protect nature or welcome diverse visitors, and extra government funding must help drive radical change". The Conservative manifesto for the 2019 United Kingdom general election included the words "We welcome the Glover Review and will create new National Parks and Areas of Outstanding Natural Beauty, as well as making our most loved landscapes greener, happier, healthier and open to all."
