= Lecale Coast AONB =

Former protected area in Northern Ireland

Coordinates: 54.273°N 5.576°W

The Lecale Coast AONB was an Area of Outstanding Natural Beauty (AONB) on the Lecale peninsula in County Down, Northern Ireland.

== Geographic location ==
It is located between Strangford Lough and the Mourne Mountains and has a low, sometimes sandy, rocky or grassy shoreline. Its southern tip lies along an extensive sand dune system at Dundrum Bay. Stretching from Dundrum Bay to Strangford village, the coastline is a place of delightful coves, dramatic headlands and secluded sandy beaches.

== AONB designation ==
It was originally designated an AONB in 1967, covering an area of 31.08 km^{2}. It was merged with the Strangford Lough AONB in 2010 to form the new Strangford and Lecale AONB.
