= Lagan Valley =

Valley in Northern Ireland

Coordinates: 54°32′08″N 5°58′44″W

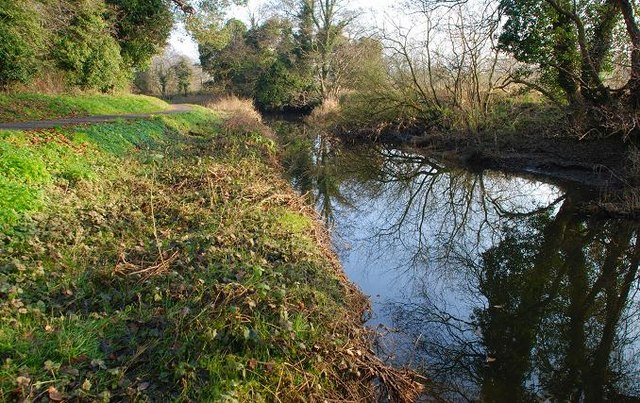
River Lagan near Drumbeg

The Lagan Valley (Irish: Gleann an Lagáin, Ulster Scots: Glen Lagan) is an area of Northern Ireland between Belfast and Lisburn. The River Lagan rises on Slieve Croob in County Down and flows generally northward discharging into Belfast Lough. For a section, the river forms part of the border between the counties of Antrim and Down.

The towpath which runs alongside the River between Lisburn and Belfast is popular with walkers, runners, cyclists, dog owners etc. It is a very scenic and peaceful area and is ideal for walking, cycling etc. As a cycle route the towpath forms part of National Cycle Route 9. There are a number of "off route" mountain bike trails along the route.

Lagan Valley AONB in Northern Ireland

The Lagan Valley is an Area of Outstanding Natural Beauty (AONB). The AONB was established in 1965 and the greater part of it lies within the Greater Belfast area.

== Political constituency ==
The Lagan Valley is also the name of a constituency in the House of Commons covering Lisburn and surrounding areas, as well as the Assembly constituency in the same area. There are approximately 242 townlands in the constituency area.

The UK parliamentary constituency has been a Unionist stronghold in the past, until 2024 when Alliance gained the seat from the Democratic Unionist Party (DUP). The current MP for the constituency is Sorcha Eastwood of Alliance who was elected in the 2024 United Kingdom general election.

== See also ==
- List of tourist attractions in Ireland
