= Lislea =

Village in County Armagh, Northern Ireland

Lislea Lios Liath
- Village / Townland
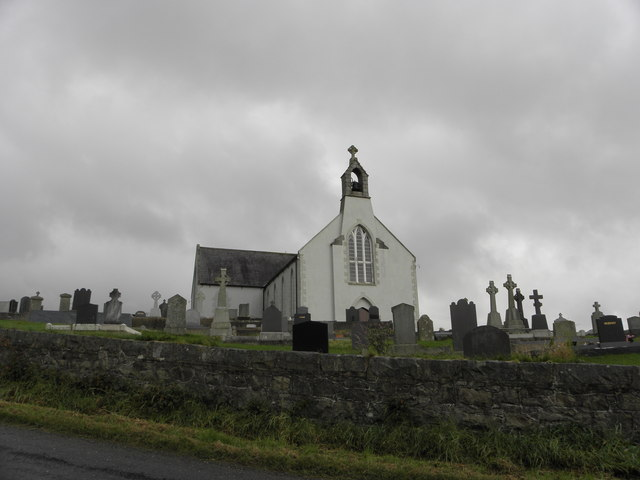
- Lislea Chapel
- Interactive map of Lislea
- Coordinates: 54.159°N 6.458°W

Lislea (/lɪsˈleɪ/ liss-LAY, from Irish Lios Liath, meaning 'Grey Ringfort') is a small village and townland near Slieve Gullion in County Armagh, Northern Ireland. It is within the civil parish of Killevy and the historic barony of Orior Upper. Today it is within the Newry, Mourne and Down District Council area. It borders the townlands of Ballard, Carricnagalliagh, Aghmakane, Duburren and Drumilly. In the 2001 Census it had a population of 84 people.

== History ==
Lislea, along with the rest of South Armagh, would have been transferred to the Irish Free State had the recommendations of the Irish Boundary Commission been enacted in 1925.

On 18 May 1984, two members of the Royal Ulster Constabulary were killed in a Provisional Irish Republican Army land mine attack.

== Places of interest ==
At the centre of the village is the Catholic Church of the Sacred Heart.

Ballykeel Dolmen, an ancient dolmen on the Ballykeel Road, lies just outside the village.

The Callan Valley river also flows through the heart of Lislea and is popular for its viewing points.

There is also the premises of the former Lislea School and Post Office, as well as the site of the former Lislea linen mill which was built by Thomas Wynne.

== Arts ==
A Drama Festival is held in the Old School House Theatre each year. It was founded in 1981 by Eugene Hannaway and has been held every year since. The Lislea Dramatic Players have won awards at many competitions.

Every two years, Lislea hosts a three-week concert called the Townland Concerts. Every concert is hosted by a specific townland/s. The townlands are grouped as so: (1) Clarkill, Levelamore, Carricknagallian, Doctor's Quarters and Longfield. (2) the Townland of Lislea (3) Annacloughmullion

== See also ==
- The Troubles in Lislea
