= Dromintee =

Village in County Armagh, Northern Ireland

Coordinates: 54°05′N 6°26′W

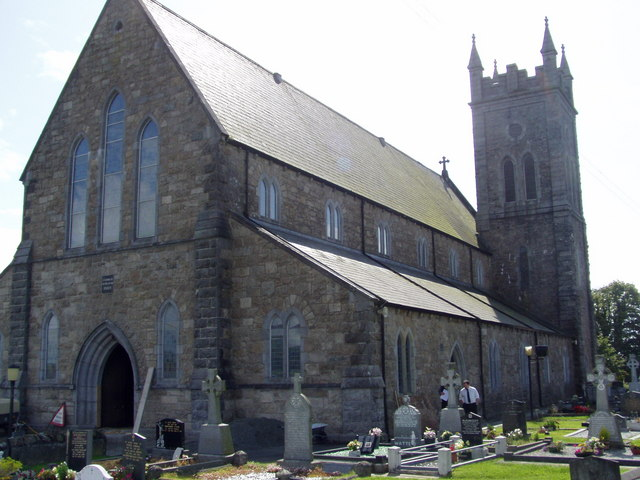
Drumintee Chapel

Dromintee or Drumintee (from Irish Druim an Tighe, meaning 'ridge of the house', or Dromainn Tí in modern Irish) is a small village and townland in County Armagh, Northern Ireland. In the 2001 Census it had a population of 364 people. It lies within the Newry and Mourne District Council area. It sits within the Ring of Gullion AONB.

== History ==
Dromintee, along with the rest of South Armagh, would have been transferred to the Irish Free State had the recommendations of the Irish Boundary Commission been enacted in 1925.

== People ==
- Writer and folklorist Michael J. Murphy (1913–1996) was born in Liverpool, but his parents were from Dromintee and he lived there from the age of eight. He contributed much to the BBC and RTÉ coverage of folklore and country life. He also published several books about Irish life, folklore and sayings, such as At Slieve Gullion's Foot.
- Captain Robert Nairac was a British Army officer who was discovered and killed by the Provisional Irish Republican Army and posthumously awarded the George Cross. Nairac was linked to several atrocities during the conflict. He visited The Three Steps Inn in Dromintee on 14 May 1977 and was approached outside the pub, abducted and killed. His body was never found. During "The Troubles" Dromintee was in a heavily militarised zone as the British security forces used hilltops of the Ring of Gullion for observation posts.

== Sport ==
Dromintee was home to the first Gaelic Athletic Association club in the county, briefly active in 1887. Jonesboro Border Rangers GFC was active from the 1920s to 1946, and the present club, Dromintee St Patrick's GAC (Cumann Naomh Pádraig), was formed in 1952 and represents the Dromintee and Jonesborough parish. Gaelic football and camogie are played.

Dromintee was the home of a former GAA president, Pádraig MacNamee. He served as president from 1938 to 1943 as a representative of Antrim.

== Church ==
Church of St Patrick, Dromintee, is the parish church of Dromintree.
