= National scenic area (Scotland) =

Conservation designation used in Scotland

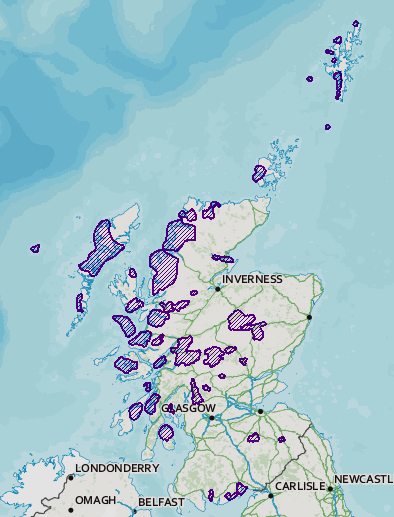
A map of the National Scenic Areas of Scotland

National scenic area (NSA) is a conservation designation used in Scotland, and administered by NatureScot on behalf of the Scottish Government. The designation's purpose is to identify areas of exceptional scenery and to protect them from inappropriate development. There are currently 40 national scenic areas (NSAs) in Scotland, covering 13% of the land area of Scotland. The areas protected by the designation are considered to represent the type of scenic beauty "popularly associated with Scotland and for which it is renowned". As such they tend to be mainly found in remote and mountainous areas, with a review in 1997 noting a potential weakness of national scenic areas was that the original selection placed undue emphasis on mountainous parts of the country. National scenic areas do however also cover seascapes, with approximately 26% of the total area protected by the designation being marine. The designation is primarily concerned with scenic qualities, although designated national scenic areas may well have other special qualities, for example related to culture, history, archaeology, geology or wildlife. Areas with such qualities may be protected by other designations (e.g. national nature reserve) that overlap with the NSA designation.

National scenic areas are designated by the IUCN as Category V Protected Landscapes, the same international category as Scotland's two national parks. Within the United Kingdom the NSA designation is regarded as equivalent to the Areas of Outstanding Natural Beauty (AONBs) of England, Wales and Northern Ireland.

The national scenic area designation does not have a high profile when compared to other conservation designations used in Scotland: in 2018 a survey by the National Trust for Scotland found that only 20% of Scots were "definitely aware" of national scenic areas, compared to 80% for National Parks.

== History ==
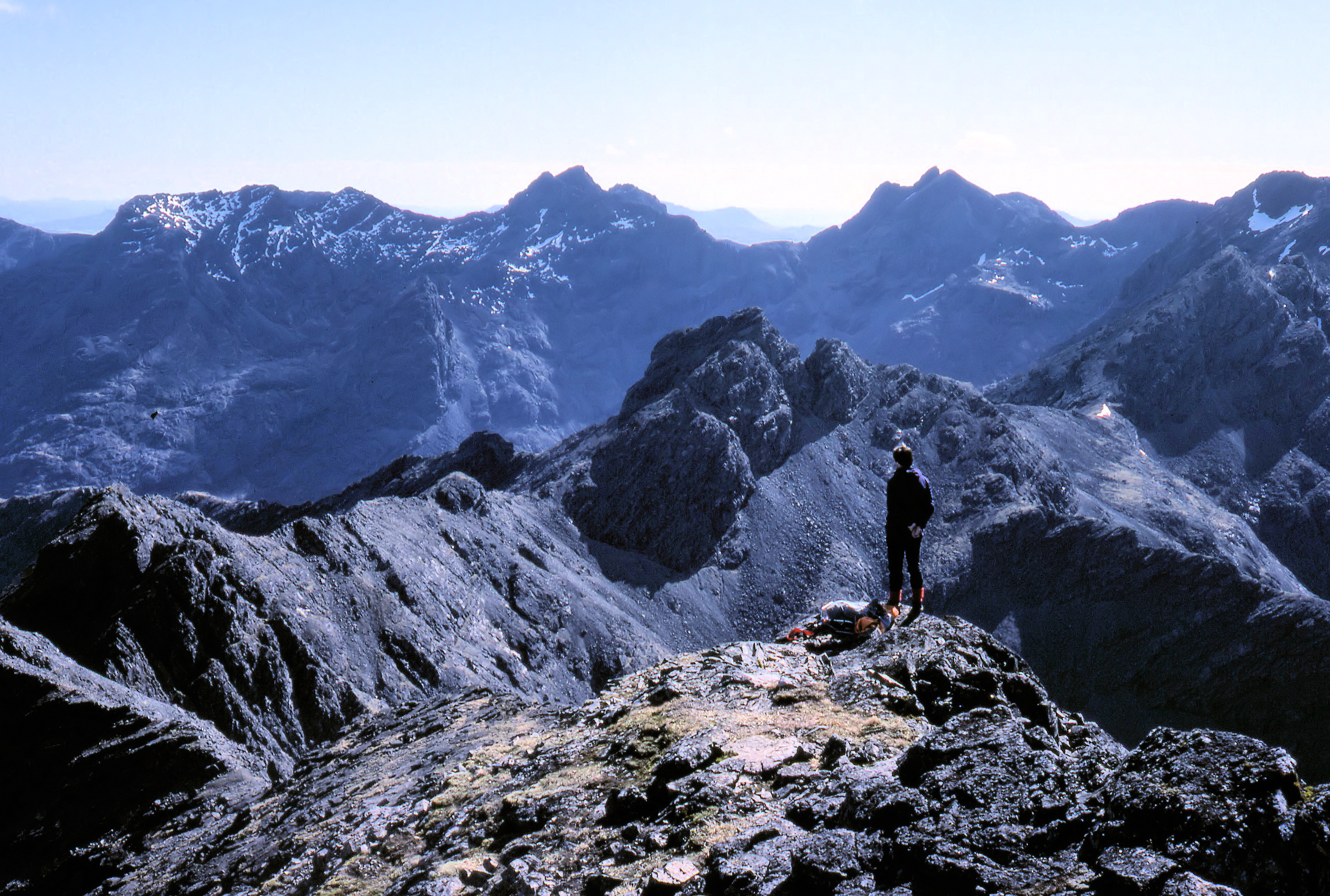
The Cuillin Hills national scenic area.

After the Second World War, the Labour government passed the National Parks and Access to the Countryside Act 1949, which led to the creation of ten national parks in England and Wales between 1951 and 1957, although no parks were created in Scotland. A committee, chaired by Sir Douglas Ramsay, was however established to consider preservation of the landscape in Scotland. The report, published in 1945, proposed that five areas (Loch Lomond & the Trossachs, the Cairngorms, Glen Coe-Ben Nevis-Black Mount, Wester Ross and Glen Strathfarrar-Glen Affric-Glen Cannich) should receive a level of protection. Accordingly, the government designated these areas as "national park direction areas", giving powers for planning decisions taken by local authorities to be reviewed by central government. After a further review of landscape protection in 1978, additional areas were identified for protection, and in 1981 the direction areas were replaced by national scenic areas, which were based on the 1978 recommendations.

Following the passage of the National Parks (Scotland) Act 2000, two national parks were established: Loch Lomond and The Trossachs National Park and the Cairngorms National Park. Both of these parks included areas that were already designated as national scenic areas, and the NSA designation remains in place alongside national park status for the areas in question.

Scottish Natural Heritage reviewed the national scenic areas between November 2007 and March 2009 to try to identify what makes the scenery of each NSA special; however no formal review into the number and extent has been undertaken since the original report. The current national scenic areas, which therefore remain as originally mapped in 1978, were legally redesignated in 2010. Despite calls from bodies such as the John Muir Trust for the protection to be extended to other areas to protect landscape and support tourism, the Scottish Government has stated that it has no plans to designate further areas. In September 2017 the Scottish Parliament's Public Petitions Committee asked the government to explain why it is not reviewing the NSAs.

== Operation ==
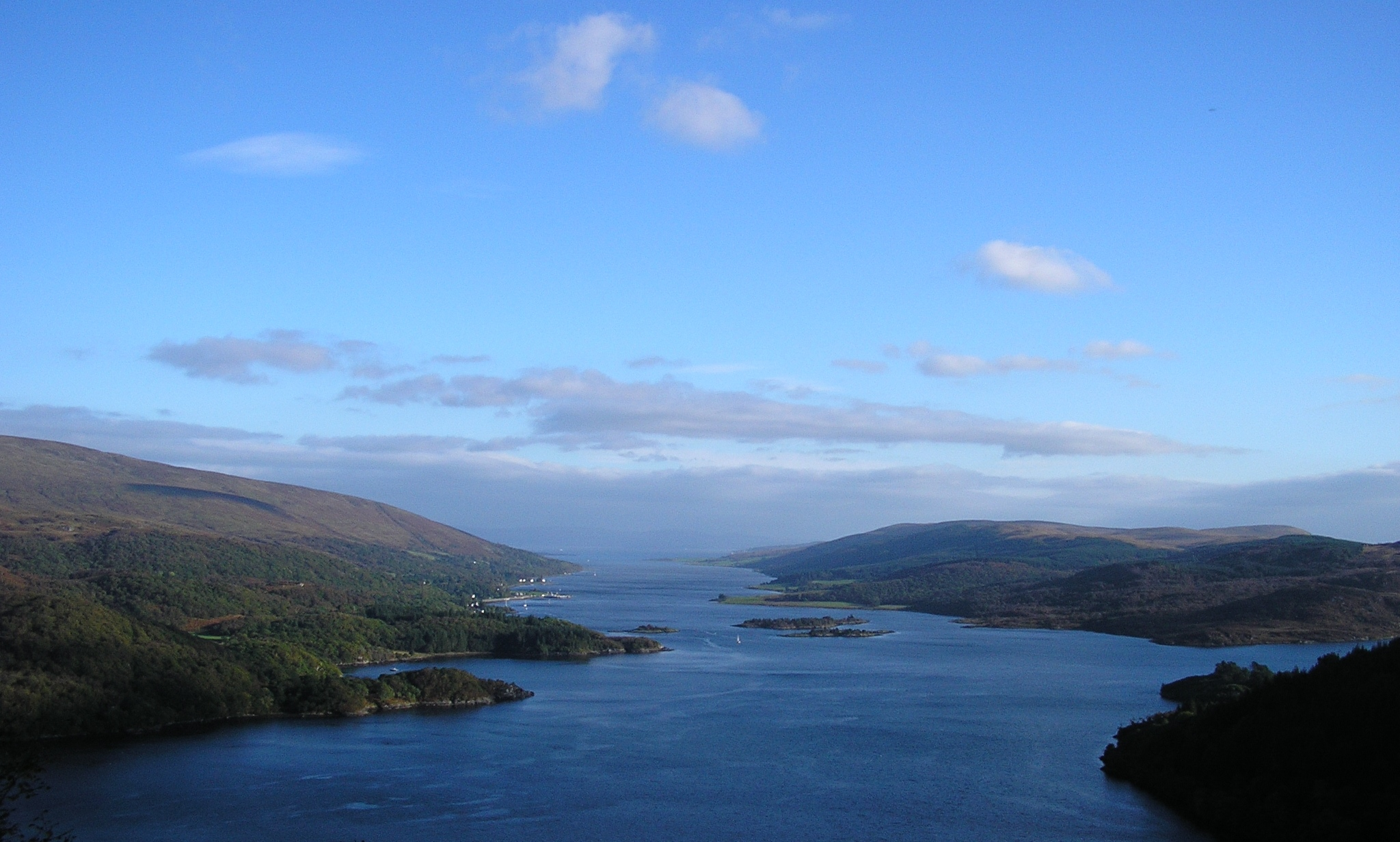
The Kyles of Bute national scenic area in Argyll and Bute.

NSAs are currently designated under the Planning etc. (Scotland) Act 2006: all 40 current NSAs were redesignated under this act via a single order in 2010. Designation provides an additional level of protection to specified areas. For developments that would ordinarily require only local authority planning permission the Scottish Government must be informed if advice from NatureScot is ignored. Additionally, there are some classes of development that would not normally require planning permission to proceed when located outwith a national scenic area, but which are subject to controls within them. These developments include the erection of agricultural and forestry buildings over 12 m high, the construction of vehicle tracks for agriculture or forestry purposes (unless forming part of an approved scheme), and local authority roadworks outside present road boundaries costing more than £100,000. The NSA designation has thus served to prevent major intrusive developments such as wind farms occurring within the designated areas.

There is no equivalent to a national park authority for national scenic areas, as controls on development are exercised through the planning system. Local authorities can produce a management strategy for each of the NSA within its territory. This strategy defines the area's special qualities and identifies the actions needed to safeguard them. As of 2018, only the three national scenic areas within Dumfries and Galloway have current management strategies .

Public access to all land in Scotland is governed by the Land Reform (Scotland) Act 2003, which grants the public a right of responsible access to most land (and water) for activities such as walking, camping, cycling, canoeing, swimming and climbing; this right applies to land regardless of ownership or whether or not it is in a designated or protected area such as an NSA, providing it is exercised responsibly (as defined by the Scottish Outdoor Access Code).

== List of national scenic areas ==
As of 2020 there were 40 national scenic areas:

Name	Photo	Land area (ha)	Marine area (ha)	Total area (ha)	Local Authorities with areas inside NSA
Assynt-Coigach		86,539	43,285	129,824	Highland
Ben Nevis and Glen Coe		90,334	1,944	92,278	Highland/Argyll and Bute/Perth and Kinross
Cairngorm Mountains		65,541	0	65,541	Highland/Aberdeenshire/Moray (also within Cairngorms National Park)
Cuillin Hills		22,726	4,594	27,320	Highland
Deeside and Lochnagar		39,787	0	39,787	Aberdeenshire/Angus (also within Cairngorms National Park)
Dornoch Firth		11,542	4,240	15,782	Highland
East Stewartry Coast		8,447	1,173	9,620	Dumfries and Galloway
Eildon and Leaderfoot		3,877	0	3,877	Scottish Borders
Fleet Valley		5,373	481	5,854	Dumfries and Galloway
Glen Affric		18,837	0	18,837	Highland
Glen Strathfarrar		4,027	0	4,027	Highland
Hoy and West Mainland		16,479	7,928	24,407	Orkney Islands
Jura		21,072	9,245	30,317	Argyll and Bute
Kintail		16,070	1,079	17,149	Highland
Knapdale		20,821	12,011	32,832	Argyll and Bute
Knoydart		40,201	10,495	50,696	Highland
Kyle of Tongue		21,093	3,396	24,488	Highland
Kyles of Bute		4,723	1,016	5,739	Argyll and Bute
Loch Lomond		28,077	0	28,077	Argyll and Bute/Stirling/West Dunbartonshire (also within Loch Lomond and the Trossachs National Park)
Loch na Keal, Isle of Mull		13,507	30,742	44,250	Argyll and Bute
Loch Rannoch and Glen Lyon		48,625	0	48,625	Perth and Kinross/Stirling
Loch Shiel		13,045	0	13,045	Highland
Loch Tummel		9,013	0	9,013	Perth and Kinross
Lynn of Lorn		5,638	10,088	15,726	Argyll and Bute
Morar, Moidart and Ardnamurchan		17,220	19,736	36,956	Highland
North Arran		20,360	6,943	27,304	North Ayrshire
Nith Estuary		14,310	28	14,337	Dumfries and Galloway
North West Sutherland		23,415	3,151	26,565	Highland
River Earn (Comrie to St. Fillans)		3,108	0	3,108	Perth and Kinross
River Tay (Dunkeld)		5,708	0	5,708	Perth and Kinross
Scarba, Lunga and the Garvellachs		2,139	4,402	6,542	Argyll and Bute
Shetland		15,486	26,347	41,833	Shetland Islands
Small Isles		16,271	30,964	47,235	Highland
South Lewis, Harris and North Uist		112,301	90,087	202,388	Western Isles
South Uist Machair		6,289	7,025	13,314	Western Isles
St Kilda		865	6,101	6,966	Western Isles
The Trossachs		4,850	0	4,850	Stirling (also within Loch Lomond and the Trossachs National Park)
Trotternish		6,128	1,789	7,916	Highland
Upper Tweeddale		12,770	0	12,770	Scottish Borders
Wester Ross		143,881	19,574	163,456	Highland

== See also ==
- Area of Outstanding Natural Beauty
- Protected areas of Scotland
- National parks of Scotland
- European Landscape Convention
