= National parks of Scotland =

Area of landscape in Scotland

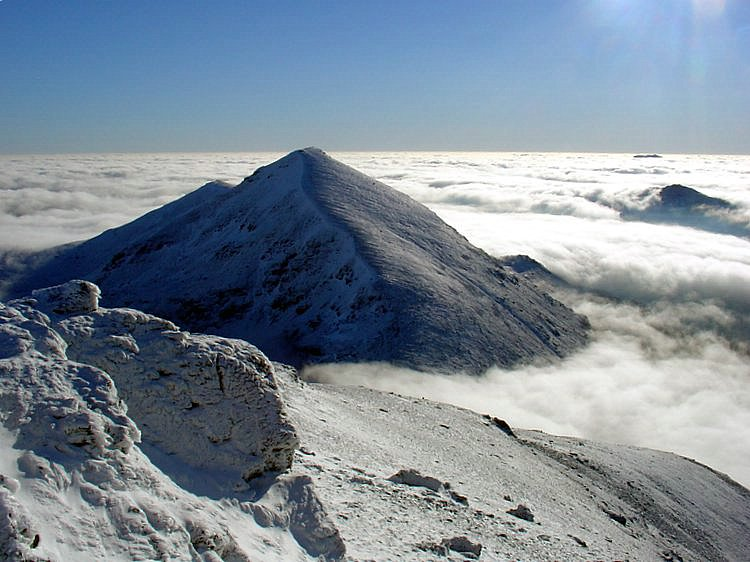
Stob Binnein in the Loch Lomond and The Trossachs National Park

The national parks of Scotland (Scottish Gaelic: Pàirc Nàiseanta) are managed areas of outstanding landscape where some forms of development are restricted to preserve the landscape and natural environment. At present, Scotland has two national parks: Loch Lomond and The Trossachs National Park, created in 2002, and the Cairngorms National Park, created in 2003.

Unlike the national parks of many other countries, the national parks of Scotland are not areas of uninhabited land owned by the state. The majority of the land is in the ownership of private landowners (including conservation bodies such as the National Trust for Scotland), and people continue to live and work in the parks. Although the landscapes often appear "wild" in character, the land is not wilderness, as it has been worked by humans for thousands of years. Like their English and Welsh counterparts, the national parks of Scotland are effectively "managed landscapes", and are classified as IUCN Category V Protected Landscapes because of this. National parks are only one of a number of designations used to protect and conserve the landscape and natural environment of Scotland. Public access to all land in Scotland is governed by the Land Reform (Scotland) Act 2003, which grants the public the freedom to roam on most land (and water) for activities such as walking, camping, cycling, canoeing, swimming and climbing; this right applies to land regardless of ownership or whether or not it is in a national park, providing it is exercised responsibly (as defined by the Scottish Outdoor Access Code).

== History ==
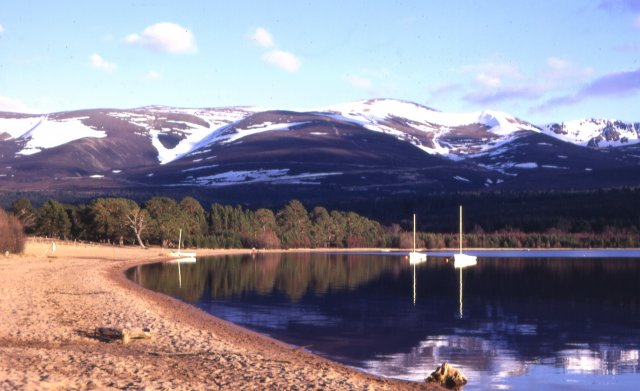
Loch Morlich in the Cairngorms National Park.

The concept of national parks was first proposed in the United States in the 1860s, where national parks were established to protect wilderness areas such as Yosemite. Scottish-born John Muir was early advocate for the preservation of wilderness in the United States, and is acknowledged as a leading figure in the formation of national parks in the US, as well as the conservation movement at large. Many other countries have since gone on to form national parks on the basis of setting aside areas of wilderness. Scotland however, lacks any such areas, as thousands of years of human activity have altered the landscape. Human settlement and activity, including agriculture, historical deforestation, overgrazing by sheep and deer, and extensive 20th century afforestation with introduced tree species (particularly conifers) have resulted in landscapes which are semi-natural.

Nonetheless, the idea that areas of wild or remote character should be designated to protect the environment and encourage public access grew in popularity throughout the nineteenth and early twentieth centuries. In 1931 a commission headed by Christopher Addison proposed the creation of a national park in the Cairngorms, alongside proposals for parks in England and Wales. Following the Second World War, the Labour government passed the National Parks and Access to the Countryside Act 1949, which led to the creation of 10 national parks in England and Wales between 1951 and 1957. No parks were created in Scotland, however a committee, chaired by Sir Douglas Ramsay, was established to consider the issue of national parks in Scotland. The report, published in 1945, proposed national parks in five areas: Loch Lomond & the Trossachs, the Cairngorms, Glen Coe-Ben Nevis-Black Mount, Wester Ross and Glen Strathfarrar-Glen Affric-Glen Cannich. The government designated these areas as "National Park Direction Areas", giving powers for planning decisions taken by local authorities to be reviewed by central government, however the areas were not given full national park status. In 1981 the direction areas were replaced by national scenic areas, of which there are now 40. Although the national scenic area designation provided a degree of additional protection via the planning process, there are no bodies equivalent to a national park authority, and whilst local authorities can produce a management strategy for each one, only the three national scenic areas within Dumfries and Galloway have current management strategies.

A 1974 report by the Countryside Commission for Scotland (CCS) entitled A Park System for Scotland did not explicitly recommend that national parks be established in Scotland, noting only that the issue would “no doubt continue to be debated”. A further CCS report into protection of the landscape of Scotland, The Mountain Areas of Scotland - Conservation and Management, was published in 1990. It recommended that four areas were under such pressure that they ought to be designated as national parks, each with an independent planning board, in order to retain their heritage value. The four areas identified were similar to those proposed by the Ramsay Committee: Loch Lomond & the Trossachs, the Cairngorms, Glen Coe-Ben Nevis-Black Mount and Wester Ross, although Wester Ross was not considered to require a dedicated planning body.

Despite this long history of recommendations that national parks be established in Scotland, no action was taken until the establishment of the Scottish Parliament in 1999. The two current parks were designated as such under the National Parks (Scotland) Act 2000, which was one of the first pieces of legislation to be passed by the Parliament. Since the original creation of the first two national parks, no further parks have been created, although the Cairngorms National Park was extended in 2010 to include the highland portion of Perthshire.

The Natural Environment (Scotland) Act 2026, which received royal assent on 12 March 2026, empowers the National Park authorities to restore and regenerate biodiversity within their boundaries.

== Proposals for additional parks ==
In June 2005, the Scottish Executive announced their intention to create Scotland's first coastal and marine national park. Five possible locations for this were considered, however no marine park has been established as of 2023.

- Solway Firth
- Argyll Islands and Coast
- Ardnamurchan, Small Isles and South Skye Coast
- North Skye Coast and Wester Ross
- North Uist, Sound of Harris, Harris and South Lewis

In 2011 the Scottish Government rejected a proposal to create a national park on the Isle of Harris. In 2013 the Scottish Campaign for National Parks proposed the seven areas listed below as suitable for national park status, however no further parks were subsequently designated.

- Harris
- Wester Ross
- Glen Affric
- Mull and the Small Isles – to be a marine park
- Ben Nevis, Glen Coe and the Black Mount
- Galloway
- Cheviot Hills

The power sharing arrangement agreed between the Scottish National Party and the Scottish Greens following the 2021 Scottish Parliament election committed the government to designate at least one additional national park by 2026. Areas that wish to be consider for national park status have been invited to submit applications between October 2023 and February 2024. As of October 2023, councils and local groups from the following areas are considering applications:

- Galloway
- Scottish Borders
- Tay Forest
- Ben Nevis and Lochaber
- Eilean a' Cheo (Skye and Raasay)
- Affric to Alladale
- Glen Affric
- Lammermuir Hills
- Largo Bay
- Loch Awe

In July 2024 the Scottish government announced that Galloway was to be designated as the country's third national park.

== Organisation ==
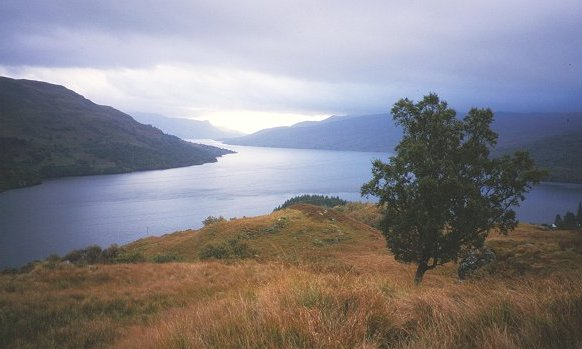
Looking eastwards along Loch Katrine in the Loch Lomond and the Trossachs National Park.

Each national park in Scotland is administered by a national park authority. Under the National Parks (Scotland) Act 2000, national parks in Scotland have four aims:

1. To conserve and enhance the natural and cultural heritage of the area
2. To promote sustainable use of the natural resources of the area
3. To promote understanding and enjoyment (including enjoyment in the form of recreation) of the special qualities of the area by the public
4. To promote sustainable economic and social development of the area's communities

The first two of these aims are identical to those included in the National Parks and Access to the Countryside Act 1949 legislation that governs national parks in England and Wales, however the Scottish national parks have two additional aims (3 and 4 above). The general purpose of the national park authority, as defined in the National Parks (Scotland) Act 2000, is to ensure that these aims are "collectively achieved ...in a coordinated way". Although the four aims have equal status, in accordance with the Sandford Principle, the first aim (conservation and enhancement of the natural and cultural heritage) is to be given greater weight when it appears to the park authority that there is irreconcilable conflict with the other aims.

A key function of the authority relates to planning permission: in this respect the two current Scottish parks differ. The Loch Lomond and The Trossachs National Park is a full planning authority, exercising powers that would otherwise be exercised by the local authority, whilst the Cairngorms National Park has the power to "call in" planning decisions from the local authority where they are considered to conflict with the aims of the park. National park authorities are also required to take the responsibility for managing access to the countryside that elsewhere falls to local authorities.

Aside from the planning and access function, national parks authorities have considerable flexibility as to how the four aims are achieved. They can, for example, acquire land, make byelaws and management agreements, provide grants, offer advice, and undertake or commission research.

The national park authority is run by a board, consisting of members elected by the community living with the park, members from the local authorities with areas in the park, and members appointed by the Scottish government. The Cairngorms National Park board has 19 members, whilst the Loch Lomond and The Trossachs National Park board has 17 members (see below).

Composition of the national park authorities
Members	Cairngorms	Loch Lomond and The Trossachs
Elected	5	5
Appointed by local authorities	7 (2 appointed by each of The Highland Council and Aberdeenshire Council; one appointed by each of Moray Council, Angus Council and Perth and Kinross Council)	6 (2 appointed by each of Stirling Council and Argyll and Bute Council; one appointed by each of West Dunbartonshire Council and Perth and Kinross Council)
Appointed by Scottish Government	7	6
Total	19	17

== List of Scottish national parks ==
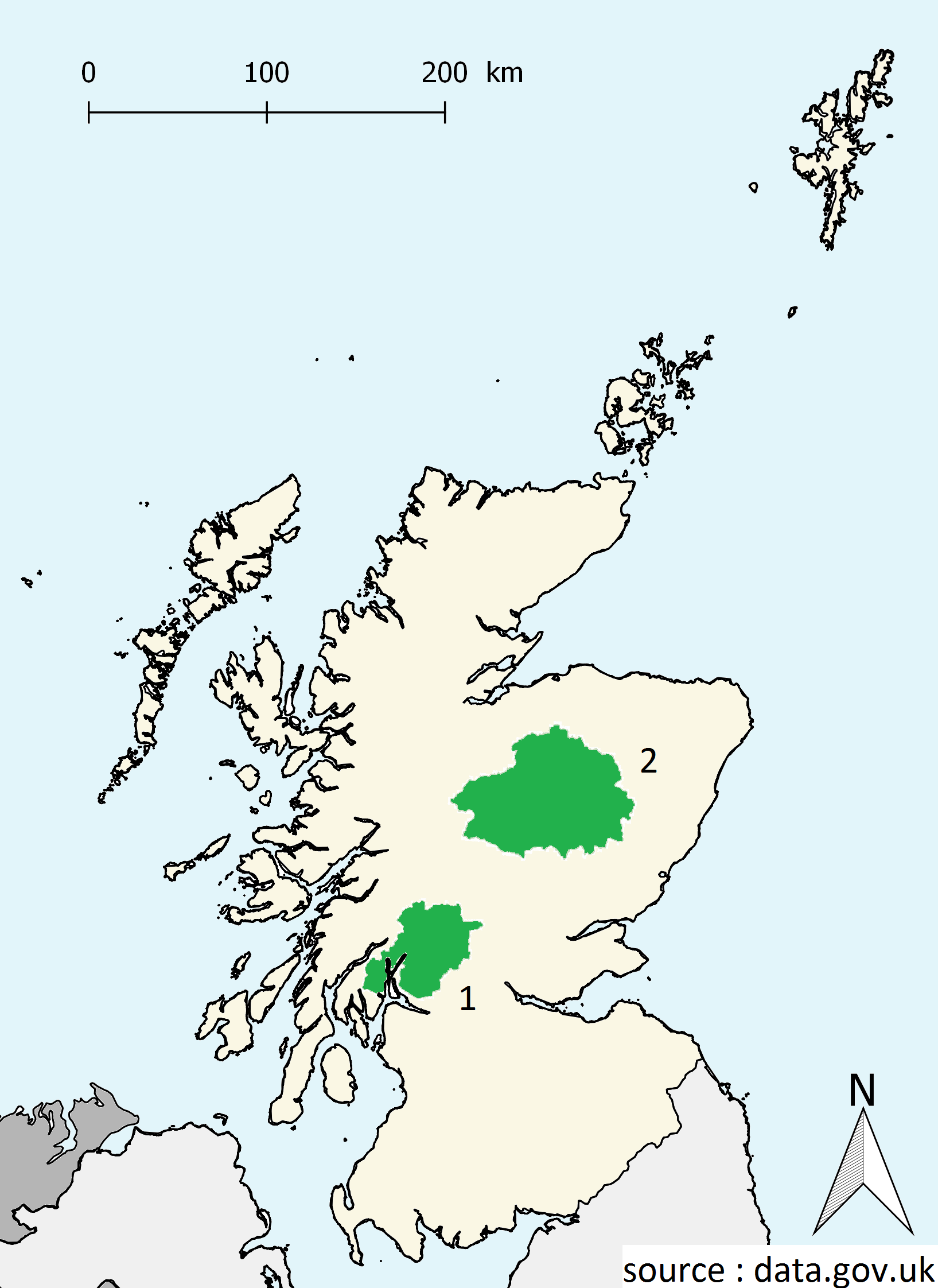
Map of national parks of Scotland

Key	National Park	Established	km²	sq mi	Local Authorities with areas inside park
1	Loch Lomond and The Trossachs National Park (Pàirc Nàiseanta Loch Laomainn is nan Tròisichean)	2002	1,865	720	Argyll and Bute, Stirling, West Dunbartonshire and Perth and Kinross
2	Cairngorms National Park (Pàirc Nàiseanta a' Mhonaidh Ruaidh)	2003	4,528	1,748	Aberdeenshire, Angus, Highland, Moray and Perth and Kinross
	Established total		6,393	2,468	

== See also ==
- Conservation in the United Kingdom
- National parks of England and Wales
- National nature reserve (Scotland)
- National Scenic Area (Scotland)
