= Census (Confidentiality) Act 1991 =

Act of the Parliament of the United Kingdom

- Act of Parliament
- Parliament of the United Kingdom
- Long title: An Act to make provision with respect to the unlawful disclosure of information acquired in connection with the discharge of functions under the Census Act 1920; and for connected purposes.
- Citation: 1991 c. 6
- Territorial extent: Section 2 extends to Northern Ireland only. The rest of the act extends to Great Britain and does not extend to Northern Ireland.

Dates
- Royal assent: 7 March 1991
- Commencement: 7 March 1991
Other legislation
Amends	Census Act 1920

Status: Current legislation

Text of statute as originally enacted

Revised text of statute as amended

The Census (Confidentiality) Act 1991 (c. 6) is an act of the Parliament of the United Kingdom. It gained royal assent on 7 March 1991.

The act amended section 8 of the Census Act 1920 by replacing a subsection concerning penalties for the unlawful disclosure of personal information from the census.

Census (Confidentiality) (Northern Ireland) Order 1991
- Statutory Instrument
- Parliament of the United Kingdom
- Citation: SI 1991/760

Dates
- Made: 20 March 1991
- Laid before Parliament: 3 April 1991
- Commencement: 22 April 1991
Other legislation
Made under	Northern Ireland Act 1974

Text of statute as originally enacted

The act applies to Great Britain. Separate legislation in the form of the Census (Confidentiality) (Northern Ireland) Order 1991 (SI 1991/760) exists for Northern Ireland.

== See also ==
- Census in the United Kingdom
- Census (Amendment) Act 2000
