= Census Act 2019 =

The Census Act 2019 may refer to:

- Census (Return Particulars and Removal of Penalties) Act 2019, an Act of the United Kingdom which added questions on sexual and gender identity to the census in England, Wales and Northern Ireland.
- Census (Amendment) (Scotland) Act 2019, an Act of the Scottish parliament which added questions on sexual and gender identity to the census in Scotland.
