= List of acts of the Scottish Parliament from 2000 =

This is a list of acts of the Scottish Parliament passed in 2000. Acts of the Scottish Parliament are enacted by the Scottish Parliament, which has legislative authority over devolved matters in relation to Scotland under the authority of the Scotland Act 1998. Acts are cited by calendar year, in the same fashion as acts of Parliament of the United Kingdom. Each act passed in a respective year is numbered consecutively with Arabic numerals, following the prefix "asp".

12 acts of the Scottish Parliament were passed in 2000.

indicates that an act has been transcribed on Wikisource, indicates that an act is available to view at legislation.gov.uk, and indicates the location of the original act in the Parliamentary Archives.

== Acts of the Scottish Parliament ==
Short title	Citation	Royal assent
Long title
Public Finance and Accountability (Scotland) Act 2000	2000 asp 1	17 January 2000
An Act of the Scottish Parliament to make provision about public resources and finances and, for the purposes of section 70 of the Scotland Act 1998, (Note: Scotland Act 1998 (c. 46)) about accountability for their use; and for connected purposes.
Budget (Scotland) Act 2000	2000 asp 2	20 March 2000
An Act of the Scottish Parliament to make provision, for financial year 2000/01, for payments out of the Scottish Consolidated Fund and the application of sums otherwise payable into the Fund, for the maximum amount of relevant expenditure for the purposes of section 94(5) of the Local Government (Scotland) Act 1973 (Note: Local Government (Scotland) Act 1973 (c. 65)) (c.65) and the maximum amounts of borrowing by certain statutory bodies; to make provision, for financial year 2001/02, for payments out of the Fund on a temporary basis; and for connected purposes.
Census (Amendment) (Scotland) Act 2000	2000 asp 3	10 April 2000
An Act of the Scottish Parliament to amend the Census Act 1920 (Note: Census Act 1920 (10 & 11 Geo. 5. c. 41)) to enable particulars about religion to be gathered.
Adults with Incapacity (Scotland) Act 2000	2000 asp 4	9 May 2000
An Act of the Scottish Parliament to make provision as to the property, financial affairs and personal welfare of adults who are incapable by reason of mental disorder or inability to communicate; and for connected purposes.
Abolition of Feudal Tenure etc. (Scotland) Act 2000	2000 asp 5	9 June 2000
An Act of the Scottish Parliament to abolish the feudal system of land tenure; to abolish a related system of land tenure; to make new provision as respects the ownership of land; to make consequential provision for the extinction and recovery of feuduties and of certain other perpetual periodical payments and for the extinction by prescription of any obligation to pay redemption money under the Land Tenure Reform (Scotland) Act 1974; (Note: Land Tenure Reform (Scotland) Act 1974 (c. 38)) to make further provision as respects real burdens affecting land; to provide for the disentailment of land; to discharge all rights of irritancy held by superiors; to abolish the obligation of thirlage; to prohibit with certain exceptions the granting of leases over land for periods exceeding 175 years; to make new provision as respects conveyancing; to enable firms with separate personality to own land; and for connected purposes.
Standards in Scotland's Schools etc. Act 2000	2000 asp 6	14 July 2000
An Act of the Scottish Parliament to make further provision as respects school education, the welfare of pupils attending independent schools and corporal punishment of pupils for whom school education is provided; to make further provision as respects School Boards; to make further provision as respects the functions, constitution and structure of the General Teaching Council for Scotland; to abolish the committee known as the Scottish Joint Negotiating Committee for School Education; to make further provision relating to the inspection of institutions within the higher education sector which educate and train persons to be, or persons who are, teachers in schools; and for connected purposes.
Ethical Standards in Public Life etc. (Scotland) Act 2000	2000 asp 7	24 July 2000
An Act of the Scottish Parliament to establish a framework for securing the observance of high standards of conduct by councillors and other persons holding public appointments; and to repeal section 2A of the Local Government Act 1986 (Note: Local Government Act 1986 (c. 10)) and make provision as to how councils are to exercise functions which relate principally to children.
Education and Training (Scotland) Act 2000	2000 asp 8	7 August 2000
An Act of the Scottish Parliament to make provision for the payment of grants in respect of the education and training of certain individuals.
Bail, Judicial Appointments etc. (Scotland) Act 2000	2000 asp 9	9 August 2000
An Act of the Scottish Parliament to change the law about bail; to enable alteration in the number of judges in the Inner House of the Court of Session; to abolish temporary sheriffs and create a new kind of sheriff; to change the law about justices of the peace; and to abolish district court prosecutions brought on behalf of or by local authorities.
National Parks (Scotland) Act 2000	2000 asp 10	9 August 2000
An Act of the Scottish Parliament to make provision for National Parks.
Regulation of Investigatory Powers (Scotland) Act 2000	2000 asp 11	28 September 2000
An Act of the Scottish Parliament to regulate surveillance and the use of covert human intelligence sources.
Sea Fisheries (Shellfish) Amendment (Scotland) Act 2000	2000 asp 12	2 November 2000
An Act of the Scottish Parliament to amend section 7(4) of the Sea Fisheries (Shellfish) Act 1967 (Note: Sea Fisheries (Shellfish) Act 1967 (c. 83)) in respect of rights of several fishery.

== See also ==
- List of acts of the Scottish Parliament
