= Jedi census phenomenon =

People reporting their religion was Jedi

A 2001 map of Jedi census phenomenon's effect in England and Wales

The Jedi census phenomenon was an urban legend which circulated in 2001 in New Zealand, Australia, and the United Kingdom, claiming those who lised Jedi (or "Jedi Knight") as their religion as part of a national census would obtain some level of legal recognition for following the quasi-religious principles of Jedi from Star Wars fictional media.

The chain email asserted any religion passing a minimum threshold (given variously as 8,000 or 10,000) would be entitled to some form of official recognition. Other reasons proffered include "do it because you love Star Wars" or "just to annoy people". The 2001 censuses recorded Jedi as the religion for 1.5% of New Zealanders, 0.37% of Australians, and 0.8% of Britons. In some cases, any "Jedi" responses to questions of religious affiliation are collected under "other" rather than reported separately.

While a few individuals claim to practise Jediism sincerely, the answer can also be a joke or a protest against the question. While giving false information on a census form is often illegal, any religion question is sometimes an exception; in any case, prosecutions are rare.

== Impact ==
=== Australia ===
In Australia, more than 70,000 people (0.37%) declared themselves members of the Jedi order in the 2001 census. The Australian Bureau of Statistics issued an official press release in response to media interest on the subject. The ABS announced that any answers that were Jedi-related in the religion question were to be classified as "not defined" and stressed the social impact of making misleading or false statements on the census. An ABS spokesperson said that "further analysis of census responses has been undertaken since the release of census data on 17 June to separately identify the number of Jedi-related responses". It is believed that there is no numerical value that determines a religion per the definition of the ABS, but there would need to be a belief system or philosophy, as well as some form of institutional or organisational structure in place.

The push for Australians to declare themselves as members of the Jedi order was one of the first examples of a concept going "viral" on the internet in Australia. The website, which was set up to promote the concept, was visited over 100,000 times in five weeks and was first archived by the Wayback Machine on 21 October 2001.

The 2006 census recorded 58,053 Jedi. In the 2011 census, the numbers listing their faith as Jedi had picked up from the 2006 census to 65,000. Close to 48,000 people reported themselves as Jedi for the 2016 census.

The Jedi census phenomenon attracted the attention of sociologist of religion Adam Possamai who discusses it in his book Religion and Popular Culture: A Hyper-Real Testament. Possamai's study placed Jediism in the context of a specific methodological classification ('hyper-real religions') and attempted to demonstrate that hostility existed towards new religions in Australia.

In the lead-up to the 2006 census, there were reports that writing Jedi on the 2006 census could lead to a fine for providing "false or misleading" information. This is despite previous admissions by the ABS that they were "fairly relaxed" about the issue in 2001 and that nobody had been prosecuted in at least 15 years.

In the lead-up to the 2016 census, there was a push from atheists warning not to use Jedi, imploring that it could be counted as being religious. The Australian Bureau of Statistics did not publish the number of people claiming Jedi as their religion in its reports on the 2016 census.

A campaign run by a coalition of Australian pro-secular organisations in the lead-up to the 2021 census included messaging specifically discouraging people from identifying as Jedi or Pastafarian in favour of a straight 'No religion' response. The same group ran another campaign in 2026 with similar messaging included.

=== Canada ===
In the 2001 census, 21,000 Canadians put down their religion as Jedi Knight. This fact was referenced by the prime minister's office as a rationale for making the 40-page-long census form voluntary. In the 2011 National Household Survey, the number fell to 9,000.

=== Croatia ===
In the 2011 census, 303 Croats put Jedi as their religion.

=== Czech Republic ===
The 2011 census preliminarily recorded 15,070 people answering the voluntary question on religion as belonging to the Jedi religion, described by the Czech Statistics Office as "the moral values of the Jedi knights". The office noted that this is an international phenomenon. As the 2011 census form did not list religions, these had to be filled out; the total number of Jedi is not artificially boosted by those who were not aware of the phenomenon before filling out the census form. On the other hand, many people encouraged others in discussions and then the media to fill in the Jedi religion prior 2011 census (as a form of protest against range, overall cost and obligatory filling of the census), which is probably the cause. The highest number of Jedi were recorded to live in Prague.

In 2021, the number of people reported to belong to the Jedi increased to over 21,000. (516 people reported being Sith.)

=== Ireland ===
In a May 2012 review of the 2011 census, the Dáil Public Accounts Committee asked the Central Statistics Office about the reliability of self-reported answers, citing people listing Jedi as their religion. The response was "We could probably tell you the number of people who have declared themselves as such, but we don't publish it". The 2016 census results list all religions receiving more than 30 responses, including 2,050 (0.085%) under "Jedi Knight". As of the 2022 census, there are 1,800 Jedi knights, a decrease of 250 since the 2016 census results.

=== Montenegro ===
In the 2011 census in Montenegro, a group of young men declared themselves as "Jedi" on the ethnicity question, as they believe that ethnicity should not be an issue today.

=== New Zealand ===
Over 53,000 people listed themselves as Jedi in New Zealand's 2001 census. New Zealand had the highest per capita population of reported Jedi in the world that year, with 1.5% marking "Jedi" as their religion. Statistics New Zealand treated Jedi responses as "Answer understood, but will not be counted".

There was a fall in the number of New Zealand Jedi five years later, with some 20,000 people giving this as their religion in the 2006 census.

The 2011 census was postponed to 2013 due to an earthquake in Christchurch and the number of Jedi in New Zealand fell to 19,089. In the 2018 census, the figure increased again, to 20,409 (0.43% total responses).

=== Serbia ===
In the 2011 census in Serbia, 640 people identified as Jedi.

=== United Kingdom ===
==== England and Wales ====
In England and Wales, 390,127 people (almost 0.8%) stated their religion as Jedi on their 2001 census forms, surpassing Sikhism, Judaism and Buddhism, and making it the fourth-largest reported religion in the country. In the 2001 census, 2.6% of the population of Brighton claimed to be Jedi. The percentages of religious affiliations were:

- Christian: 70%
- No religion: 16%
- Chose not to respond: 7.8%
- Muslim: 3.1%
- Hindu: 2.1%
- Jedi: 0.7%

It was confirmed prior to the census that citizens were not liable for a fine concerning question 10 (on religion). This was based on section 1(2) of the Census (Amendment) Act 2000, which amended section 8 of the Census Act 2000 to state that "no person shall be liable to a penalty under subsection (1) for refusing or neglecting to state any particulars in respect of religion". The change in the law was implemented by The Census (Amendment) Order 2000 and The Census (Amendment) Regulations 2000.

Jedi Knight was assigned its own code in England and Wales for census processing, numbered 896. Officials from the Office for National Statistics pointed out that this merely means that it has been registered as a common answer to the "religion" question and that this does not confer on it the status of official recognition. John Pullinger, director of reporting and analysis for the census, noted that many people who would otherwise not have completed a census form did so solely to record themselves as Jedi, so this joke helped to improve the quality of the census. The Office for National Statistics revealed the total figure in a press release entitled "390,000 Jedi there are".

In June 2005, Jamie Reed, newly elected Labour Member of Parliament (MP) for Copeland in Cumbria, declared himself to be the first Jedi Member of Parliament during his maiden speech. The statement, made in the context of an ongoing debate regarding the Incitement to Religious Hatred bill, was confirmed by Reed's office to be a joke instead of a serious statement of faith. During a subsequent committee debate on the bill, the Conservative Member of Parliament for Beaconsfield, Dominic Grieve, proposed as "a bit of a joke" to exclude Jedi Knights from the protection of the proposed act, along with Satanists and proponents of animal sacrifice, illustrating the difficulty of defining religious belief in legislation. Similarly, in April 2006, Edward Leigh, the Conservative Member of Parliament for Gainsborough, asked whether he would be allowed to set up a Jedi knights faith school during a committee debate on the Education and Inspections Bill.

On 16 November 2006, two Jedi delivered a protest letter to UN officials in recognition of the International Day for Tolerance. The letter, written by Simon Cohen of the Global Tolerance public relations agency, requested that it be renamed the "UN Interstellar Day of Tolerance" and cited the 2001 census showing 390,000 Jedi in England and Wales.

According to 2011 census figures, the number of Jedi had fallen to 176,632, placing it in seventh place, having been overtaken by Judaism and Buddhism, but still comfortably outnumbering any other alternative or mock religions. The magazine Metal Hammer also encouraged readers to mark "Heavy Metal" as their religion, leading to over 6,000 responses.

In 2021, Humanists UK asked nonreligious people not to protest the census religion question by writing in "Jedi" but rather to select "no religion" instead. The 2011 census recorded over 176,000 followers and the 2001 census recorded over 390,000 followers. The 2021 United Kingdom census recorded a dramatic decline in the number of Jedi Knights with fewer than 1,600 followers in England and Wales.

==== Scotland ====
In Scotland, 14,052 people stated that Jedi was their current religion (14,014 "Jedi", 24 "Jedi Order" and 14 "Sith") and 2,733 stated that it was their religion of upbringing (2,682 "Jedi", 36 "Jedi Order" and 15 "The Dark Side") in the 2001 census. The proportion of people stating their religion as Jedi in Scotland was lower than that in England and Wales, at 0.277%.

In April 2009, it became known that eight police officers serving with Scotland's largest police force, Strathclyde, listed their official religion as Jedi in voluntary diversity forms. The details were obtained in a Freedom of Information request by Jane's Police Review.

== Criticism ==
The Atheist Foundation of Australia objects to non-religious individuals answering with any joke answer as this would lead to an underrepresentation of non-religious people in census data.

== See also ==
- Parody religion
- Protest vote

== Sources ==
- Singler, Beth (14 June 2014). ""See Mom It Is Real": The UK Census, Jediism and Social Media". Journal of Religion in Europe. 7 (2): 150–168. doi:10.1163/18748929-00702005. ISSN 1874-8929.
- Porter, Jenniger E. (2006). "'I Am a Jedi': Star Wars Fandom, Religious Belief, and the 2001 Census". In Kapell, Matthew; Lawrence, John Shelton (eds.). Finding the Force of the Star Wars Franchise: Fans, Merchandise, & Critics. Peter Lang. ISBN 978-0-8204-6333-9.
