= 2019 census =

2019 census may refer to:

- 2019 Alberta municipal censuses
- 2019 Belarusian census
- 2019 Vietnamese census

== See also ==
- Census Act 2019 (disambiguation)
