= List of acts of the Scottish Parliament from 2019 =

This is a list of acts of the Scottish Parliament passed in 2019. Acts of the Scottish Parliament are enacted by the Scottish Parliament, which has legislative authority over devolved matters in relation to Scotland under the authority of the Scotland Act 1998. Acts are cited by calendar year, in the same fashion as acts of Parliament of the United Kingdom. Each act passed in a respective year is numbered consecutively with Arabic numerals, following the prefix "asp".

17 acts of the Scottish Parliament were passed in 2019.

indicates that an act has been transcribed on Wikisource, indicates that an act is available to view at legislation.gov.uk, and indicates the location of the original act in the Parliamentary Archives.

== Acts of the Scottish Parliament ==
Short title	Citation	Royal assent
Long title
Scottish Crown Estate Act 2019	2019 asp 1	15 January 2019
An Act of the Scottish Parliament to rename Crown Estate Scotland (Interim Management); to make provision about the management of the Scottish Crown Estate; and for connected purposes.
Pow of Inchaffray Drainage Commission (Scotland) Act 2019	2019 asp 2	17 January 2019
An Act of the Scottish Parliament to incorporate and reconstitute the Pow of Inchaffray Drainage Commission; to make provision for its functions and for the appointment of Commissioners; to make provision for the calculation of the annual assessments payable by the owners of land benefited by the Pow; to make provision for meetings of the Commissioners and heritors; to make provision for the Commissioners to have access to the Pow over neighbouring land for necessary purposes and for the Commissioners' consent to be required for activities affecting the Pow and adjacent land etc.; and for connected purposes.
Budget (Scotland) Act 2019	2019 asp 3	29 March 2019
An Act of the Scottish Parliament to make provision, for financial year 2019/20, for the use of resources by the Scottish Administration and certain bodies whose expenditure is payable out of the Scottish Consolidated Fund, for the maximum amounts of borrowing by certain statutory bodies and for authorising the payment of sums out of the Fund; to make provision, for financial year 2020/21, for authorising the payment of sums out of the Fund on a temporary basis; and for connected purposes.
Damages (Investment Returns and Periodical Payments) (Scotland) Act 2019	2019 asp 4	24 April 2019
An Act of the Scottish Parliament to make provision in relation to the assumed rate of return on investment of particular damages awarded in personal injury cases; and to make provision in relation to periodical payments of various damages awarded in personal injury cases.
Hutchesons' Hospital Transfer and Dissolution (Scotland) Act 2019	2019 asp 5	31 May 2019
An Act of the Scottish Parliament to transfer the property, rights, interests and liabilities of The Royal Incorporation of Hutchesons' Hospital in the City of Glasgow to a successor Scottish Charitable Incorporated Organisation; to dissolve the Incorporation; and to repeal the Hutchesons' Hospital Act 1872. (Note: Hutchesons' Hospital Act 1872 (35 & 36 Vict. c. xx))
Health and Care (Staffing) (Scotland) Act 2019	2019 asp 6	6 June 2019
An Act of the Scottish Parliament to make provision about staffing by the National Health Service and by providers of care services.
Age of Criminal Responsibility (Scotland) Act 2019	2019 asp 7	11 June 2019
An Act of the Scottish Parliament to raise the age of criminal responsibility to 12 years and to make consequential changes to the law on the disclosure of criminal records and of other information relating to individuals working or seeking to work with children or certain adults; on the provision of information by the Principal Reporter to persons adversely affected by the behaviour of children; on the taking of certain children to a place of safety by the police; on the search of certain children by the police; on police interviews with certain children; and on the taking of forensic samples from certain children by the police; and for connected purposes.
Vulnerable Witnesses (Criminal Evidence) (Scotland) Act 2019	2019 asp 8	13 June 2019
An Act of the Scottish Parliament to make provision about the use of special measures for the purpose of taking the evidence of child witnesses and other vulnerable witnesses in criminal proceedings; to make provision about the procedure relating to taking evidence by commissioner; to make provision about the procedure for authorisation of standard special measures; and for connected purposes.
South of Scotland Enterprise Act 2019	2019 asp 9	12 July 2019
An Act of the Scottish Parliament to establish South of Scotland Enterprise and to provide for its functions.
Fuel Poverty (Targets, Definition and Strategy) (Scotland) Act 2019	2019 asp 10	18 July 2019
An Act of the Scottish Parliament to set targets relating to the eradication of fuel poverty; to define fuel poverty; to require the production of a fuel poverty strategy; and to make provision about reporting on fuel poverty.
Human Tissue (Authorisation) (Scotland) Act 2019	2019 asp 11	18 July 2019
An Act of the Scottish Parliament to make provision about authorisation of the removal and use of part of the body of a deceased person for transplantation and other purposes; and for connected purposes.
Census (Amendment) (Scotland) Act 2019	2019 asp 12	18 July 2019
An Act of the Scottish Parliament to amend the Census Act 1920 (Note: Census Act 1920 (10 & 11 Geo. 5. c. 41)) to enable particulars about transgender status and history and sexual orientation to be gathered voluntarily.
Planning (Scotland) Act 2019	2019 asp 13	25 July 2019
An Act of the Scottish Parliament to make provision about how land is developed and used.
Management of Offenders (Scotland) Act 2019	2019 asp 14	30 July 2019
An Act of the Scottish Parliament to make provision for electronic monitoring of offenders and as to certain other restrictive measures imposable on offenders; to make provision about periods and processes as regards disclosure of convictions by offenders; and to make provision concerning particular aspects of the system governing parole of offenders.
Climate Change (Emissions Reduction Targets) (Scotland) Act 2019	2019 asp 15	31 October 2019
An Act of the Scottish Parliament to amend the Climate Change (Scotland) Act 2009 (Note: Climate Change (Scotland) Act 2009 (asp 12)) to make provision setting targets for the reduction of greenhouse gases emissions and to make provision about advice, plans and reports in relation to those targets, with the objective of Scotland contributing appropriately to the world's efforts to deliver on the Paris Agreement (Note: Paris Agreement) reached at the 21st Conference of the Parties of the United Nations Framework Convention on Climate Change.
Children (Equal Protection from Assault) (Scotland) Act 2019	2019 asp 16	7 November 2019
An Act of the Scottish Parliament to abolish the defence of reasonable chastisement; and for connected purposes.
Transport (Scotland) Act 2019	2019 asp 17	15 November 2019
An Act of the Scottish Parliament to require the production of a national strategy in relation to transport; to make provision for low emission zones; to make provision for and in connection with the powers of local transport authorities in connection with the operation of local bus services in their areas; to make provision about arrangements under which persons may be entitled to travel on local bus and other transport services; to prohibit the parking of vehicles on pavements, prohibit double parking and prohibit parking adjacent to dropped footways; to make provision enabling local authorities to make schemes under which a charge may be levied for providing workplace parking places; to make provision in connection with charges arising from parking on private land; to make provision in connection with the status of the office of the Scottish Road Works Commissioner, the Commissioner's functions and the regulation of road works; to make provision in connection with regional Transport Partnerships and to adjust the number of members on the British Waterways Board; and for connected purposes.

== See also ==
- List of acts of the Scottish Parliament
