= John Dower (civil servant) =

Architect and national park creator from Yorkshire, England (1900–1947)

John Gordon Dower
- Born: 2 September 1900; Ilkley, Yorkshire, England
- Died: 3 October 1947 (aged 47); Kirkby Malham, Yorkshire, England
- Education: St John's College, Cambridge
- Occupations: Architect and civil servant
- Known for: National parks of England and Wales
- Spouse: Pauline Trevelyan (m. 1929)

John Gordon Dower (2 September 1900 – 3 October 1947) was an English civil servant and architect, who, as secretary of the Standing Committee on National Parks, produced in 1945 the first post-war official report which set out what National Parks in England and Wales should be like.

== Early life ==
Dower was born in Ilkley, in the West Riding of Yorkshire, in September 1900. His father was a Methodist lay preacher and was a director of a steel firm in Leeds. Dower was educated at a local school in Ilkley and he then studied for a degree in architecture at St John's College, Cambridge.

== The national parks ==
In 1929, Dower married Pauline Trevelyan, whose father was Charles Trevelyan; this introduced him into a campaign to protect the wild areas of Britain. Dower prepared a report in the late 1930s, but it was put to one side when the Second World War broke out and he was called up as a Royal Engineer. During his time in the army, Dower contracted virulent tuberculosis and was invalided out of military service. While convalescing at his home in Kirkby Malham, he was asked to compile a report again into the national parks. As he was too ill to drive, Pauline took them around the country so he could make notes, even being detained by the Home Guard in Cornwall.

Dower's report was completed in 1943, but it was not published until 1945. The central tenet for the creation of the national parks was:

An extensive area of beautiful and relatively wild country in which, for the nation’s benefit and by appropriate national decision and action, (a) the characteristic landscape beauty is strictly preserved, (b) access and facilities for public open-air enjoyment are amply provided, (c) wild-life and buildings and places of architectural and historical interest are suitably protected, while (d) established farming use is effectively maintained. — John Dower, 1945

This report, and a subsequent one by Sir Arthur Hobhouse, laid the foundations for the National Parks and Access to the Countryside Act 1949 which created the National Park system.

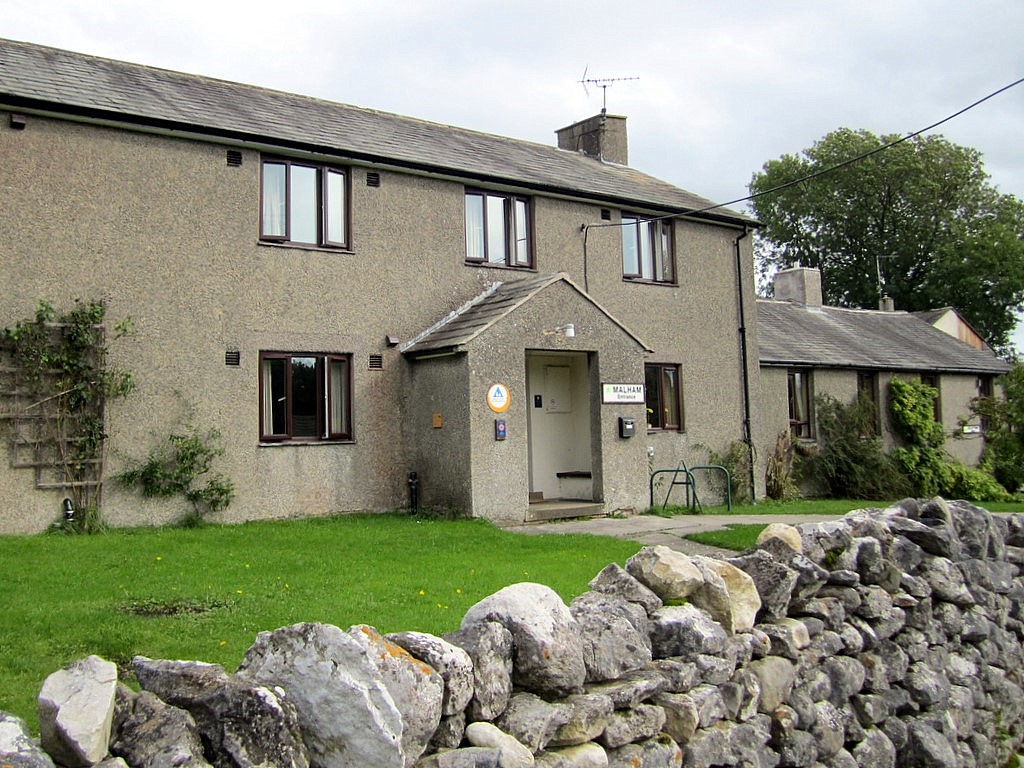
The Malham Youth Hostel, designed by Dower

== Personal life ==
Dower was a keen rambler and fly-fishermen. he had also once been president of the Ramblers Association. He died from the effects of tuberculosis in Cambo House, near Morpeth, in October 1947. His family scattered his ashes on Ilkley Moor.

John and Pauline Dower had a daughter, Susan, and two sons, Michael and Robin. Michael went on to be a national park officer for the Peak District and also became the director-general of the Countryside Commission between 1992 and 1996.

In 1948, the Malham Youth Hostel, which Dower had designed, was dedicated to him by his wife and father-in-law.
