= Railtrack (Waverley Station) Order Confirmation Act 2000 =

United Kingdom law

- Act of Parliament
- Parliament of the United Kingdom
- Long title: An Act to confirm a Provisional Order under the Private Legislation Procedure (Scotland) Act 1936, relating to Railtrack (Waverley Station).
- Citation: 2000 c. vi
- Territorial extent: United Kingdom of Great Britain and Ireland

Dates
- Royal assent: 14 June 2000

Text of statute as originally enacted

The Railtrack (Waverley Station) Order Confirmation Act 2000 (c. vi) is an act of the Parliament of the United Kingdom. The act allowed the rebuilding of parts of Waverley Station, Edinburgh by the exemption from or repeal of several 19th-century laws.

== Provisions ==
The provisions of the act include:

- Confirming the Railtrack (Waverley Station) Order 2000 which in turn, made provisions for the rebuilding of Waverley Station, including the repeal of parts of the North British Railway (Stations Enlargement) Act 1851, the North British Railway (New Works) Act 1866 and the North British Railway Act 1894.

== Timeline ==
The act had its first reading in the House of Commons on 16 May 2000 and its second reading on 24 May 2000. It had its first reading in the House of Lords on 7 June 2000 and was deemed to have been read a second time the same day. It was read a third time on the 13 June 2000 and achieved Royal Assent the next day.
