= Sea Fisheries (Shellfish) Amendment (Scotland) Act 2000 =

Act of the Scottish Parliament

Sea Fisheries (Shellfish) Amendment (Scotland) Act 2000 (Note: Section 2(a).)
- Act of the Scottish Parliament
- Scottish Parliament
- Long title: An Act of the Scottish Parliament to amend section 7(4) of the Sea Fisheries (Shellfish) Act 1967 in respect of rights of several fishery.
- Citation: 2000 asp 12
- Introduced by: Tavish Scott
- Territorial extent: Scotland

Dates
- Royal assent: 2 November 2000
- Commencement: 2 January 2001 (Note: Section 2(b).)

Other legislation
- Amends: Sea Fisheries (Shellfish) Act 1967

Status: Current legislation

Text of statute as originally enacted

Revised text of statute as amended

Text of the Sea Fisheries (Shellfish) Amendment (Scotland) Act 2000 as in force today (including any amendments) within the United Kingdom, from legislation.gov.uk.

The Sea Fisheries (Shellfish) Amendment (Scotland) Act 2000 (asp 12) is an act of the Scottish Parliament which amends section 7(4) of the Sea Fisheries (Shellfish) Act 1967 in respect of rights of several fishery.

== Background ==
The original bill was introduced in the Scottish Parliament on 8 March 2000 by Tavish Scott MSP. The existing Sea Fisheries (Shellfish) Act 1967 required that a shellfish farmer seeking a several order to allow them to control an area of seabed on which to farm shellfish frequently encountered opposition from fishermen who fish in the area to be covered by the order. If the several order was issued, all fishing was banned within the area covered, regardless of whether or not the fishing operations damaged the interests of the shellfish farmer.

The amendment to the 1967 act allows Scottish Ministers making a several order to authorise the continuation of specified non-damaging fishing operations within the area covered by the order. The aim of the bill was thus to avoid unnecessary and avoidable conflicts of interests between shellfish farmers and fishermen.

== Provision ==
The purpose of the bill was to permit Scottish Ministers to authorise the use by fishermen of non-damaging types of fishing gear such as creels in areas covered by several fisheries orders. Thus, in section 7 of the Sea Fisheries (Shellfish) Act 1967 (c. 83) (protection of fisheries), in subsection (4)(a), after sub-paragraph (ii) there was inserted:

or

(iii) in the case of several fishery, an implement of a type specified in the order and so used as not to disturb or injure in any manner shellfish of the description in question.

The purpose of these provisions was to reduce the conflict between shellfish and lobster creel farmers.

== Passage through Parliament ==
The Sea Fisheries (Shellfish) Amendment (Scotland) Act 2000 was passed by the Scottish Parliament on 28 September 2000. The bill was given royal assent on 2 November 2000.

== See also ==
- Fisheries Act
