= Census (Return Particulars and Removal of Penalties) Act 2019 =

United Kingdom law

- Act of Parliament
- Parliament of the United Kingdom
- Long title: An Act to amend the Census Act 1920 and the Census Act (Northern Ireland) 1969 in relation to the provision of particulars about sexual orientation and gender identity.
- Citation: 2019 c. 28
- Introduced by: David Lidington MP (Commons); Lord Young of Cookham (Lords)
- Territorial extent: England and Wales Section 1 only Northern Ireland Section 2 only

Dates
- Royal assent: 8 October 2019
- Commencement: 8 October 2019

Other legislation
- Relates to: Census Act 1920; Census Act (Northern Ireland) 1969

Status: Current legislation

History of passage through Parliament

Text of statute as originally enacted

Revised text of statute as amended

The Census (Return Particulars and Removal of Penalties) Act 2019 (c. 28) is an act of the Parliament of the United Kingdom. The act removed penalties for people not responding to new census questions on sexual orientation, gender identity (including transgender status).

== Provisions ==
The provisions of the act include:

- Amending the Census Act 1920 to add questions on sexual orientation and gender identity to the census.
- Amending the Census Act (Northern Ireland) 1969 to add questions on sexual orientation and gender identity to the census.
- Making it voluntary to answer any such questions.

== See also ==
- 2021 United Kingdom census
- Census (Amendment) (Scotland) Act 2019
