= National parks of the United Kingdom =

Areas of landscape in the United Kingdom

Fourteen areas are designated as national parks in the UK; in addition, The Broads (in light green, to the east) now has equivalent status

The national parks of the United Kingdom (Welsh: parciau cenedlaethol; Scottish Gaelic: pàircean nàiseanta) are 15 areas of relatively undeveloped and scenic landscape across the country. Despite their name, they are quite different from national parks in many other countries, which are usually owned and managed by governments as protected community resources, and which do not usually include permanent human communities.

In the United Kingdom, an area designated as a national park may include substantial settlements and human land uses that are often integral parts of the landscape. Land within national parks remains largely in private ownership; for example, nearly one-fifth of South Downs National Park's area, 70,699 acres (28,611 hectares), is owned by eight members of the gentry. (Note: Two dukes, three viscounts, one baron and two baronets.) These parks are therefore not national parks, according to the internationally accepted standard of the IUCN but they are areas of outstanding landscape where planning controls are significantly more restrictive than elsewhere.

Within the UK, there are 15 national parks, of which ten are in England, three are in Wales and two are in Scotland; there are no national parks in Northern Ireland. An estimated 110 million people visit the national parks of England and Wales each year. Recreation and tourism bring visitors and funds into the parks, to sustain their conservation efforts and support the local population through jobs and businesses. However, these visitors also bring problems, such as erosion and traffic congestion, and conflicts over the use of the parks' resources. Access to cultivated land in England and Wales is restricted to public rights of way and permissive paths. (Note: Under the Countryside and Rights of Way Act 2000, there is a right of access for walkers to most, but not all, uncultivated areas in England and Wales.)

== Administration ==
National parks are a devolved matter, so each of the countries of the United Kingdom has its own policies and arrangements for them. The national parks of Scotland and those of England and Wales are governed by separate laws: the National Parks (Scotland) Act 2000 and the National Parks and Access to the Countryside Act 1949 respectively.

The Environment Act 1995 defines the role of national parks in England and Wales as being:

- to conserve and enhance the natural beauty, wildlife and cultural heritage of the National Park
- to promote opportunities for the understanding and enjoyment of the special qualities of the National Parks by the public.

The Broads differs from the twelve national parks in England and Wales, in having a third purpose that carries equal weight, that of:

- protecting the interests of navigation.

The Scottish national parks have two further statutory purposes:

- to promote sustainable use of the natural resources of the area
- to promote sustainable economic and social development of the area's communities.

=== National park authorities ===
Following the Environment Act 1995, each English and Welsh national park has been managed by its own national park authority, a special-purpose local authority, since April 1997. Previously, all but the Peak District and the Lake District were governed by county councils; these were the first two national parks to be designated, were under the control of planning boards that were independent of county councils. Similar national park authorities have also been established for the Scottish parks under separate legislation.

Slightly over half of the members of each national park authority are appointees from the principal local authorities covered by the park; the remainder are appointed by the Secretary of State for Environment, Food and Rural Affairs (in England) or the Welsh Ministers (in Wales), some to represent local parish or community councils, others to represent the national interest. The Broads Authority also has members appointed by Natural England, Great Yarmouth Port Authority and the Environment Agency. The national park authorities and the Broads Authority are covered by regulations similar to those that apply to local councils.

The national park authority for each park addresses the stated aim in partnership with other organisations, such as the National Trust. In cases where there may be conflict between the two purposes of designation, the first (to conserve and enhance the natural beauty, wildlife and cultural heritage of the National Park) must take precedence under the Sandford Principle. This principle was given statutory force by section 62 of the Environment Act 1995, although there are no explicit provisions as to how wildlife is to be preserved. The national park authorities also have a duty to foster the economic and social wellbeing of communities in pursuit of these purposes.

Funding for national parks is complex, but the full cost of each park authority is funded from central government funds. In the past, this was partly paid for by local authorities and refunded to them from the government to varying degrees. In 2022/3, the 13 park authorities in England and Wales received around £65 million of central government funding.

=== Other organisations ===
The UK's national parks are members of National Parks UK, which works to promote them, and to facilitate training and development for staff of all the parks.

Natural England is the statutory body responsible for designating new national parks in England, subject to approval by the Secretary of State; Natural Resources Wales designates new national parks in Wales, subject to approval by the Welsh ministers. All 15 UK national parks are represented by the Association of National Park Authorities, which exists to provide the park authorities with a single voice when dealing with government and its agencies. The Campaign for National Parks (formerly the Council for National Parks) is a charity that works to protect and enhance the national parks of England and Wales.

== Legal designation ==
National parks were first designated under the National Parks and Access to the Countryside Act 1949; in England and Wales, any new national park is designated under this Act and must be confirmed by the Secretary of State for Environment, Food and Rural Affairs. The 1949 Act came about after a prolonged campaign for public access to the countryside in the United Kingdom with its roots in the Industrial Revolution. The first 'freedom to roam' bill was introduced to Parliament in 1884 by James Bryce, but it was not until 1931 that a government inquiry recommended the creation of a 'National Park Authority' to select areas for designation as national parks. Despite the recommendation and continued lobbying and demonstrations of public discontent, such as the 1932 Kinder Scout mass trespass in the Peak District, nothing further was done until a 1945 white paper on national parks was produced as part of the Labour Party's planned post-war reconstruction, leading in 1949 to the passing of the National Parks and Access to the Countryside Act.

In England and Wales, as in Scotland, designation as a national park means that the area has been identified as being of importance to the national heritage and as such is worthy of special protection and attention. Unlike the model adopted in many other countries, such as the US and Germany, this does not mean the area is owned by the state. National parks in the UK may include substantial settlements and human land uses, which are often integral parts of the landscape; within a national park, there are many landowners including public bodies and private individuals.

== Origins and growth ==
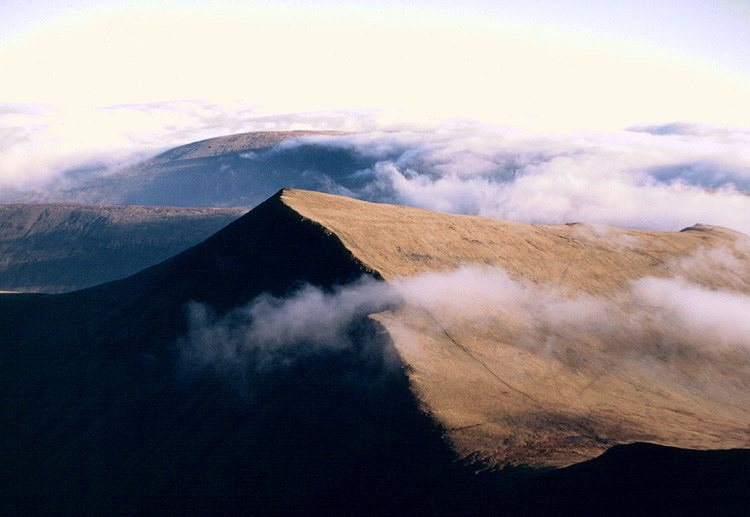
Part of the Brecon Beacons National Park (Bannau Brycheiniog), looking from the highest point of Pen y Fan (886 m; 2,907 ft) to Cribyn (795 m; 2,608 ft)

The head of Wasdale; this view appears on the logo of the Lake District National Park Authority

Archaeological evidence from prehistoric Britain shows that the areas now designated as national parks have been occupied by humans since the Stone Age, at least 5,000 years ago and in some cases much earlier.

Before the 19th century, relatively wild and remote areas were often seen simply as uncivilised and dangerous. In 1725, Daniel Defoe described the High Peak as "the most desolate, wild and abandoned country in all England." However, by the early 19th century, romantic poets such as Byron, Coleridge and Wordsworth wrote about the inspirational beauty of the "untamed" countryside. Wordsworth described the Lake District as a "sort of national property in which every man has a right and interest who has an eye to perceive and a heart to enjoy" in 1810. This early vision, based in the Picturesque movement, took over a century and much controversy, to take legal form in the UK with the National Parks and Access to the Countryside Act 1949.

The idea for a form of national parks was first proposed in the United States in the 1860s, where national parks were established to protect wilderness areas such as Yosemite. This model has been used in many other countries since, but not in the UK.

After thousands of years of human integration into the landscape, Britain lacks any substantial areas of wilderness. Furthermore, those areas of natural beauty so cherished by the romantic poets were often only maintained and managed in their existing state by human activity, usually agriculture.

=== Government support is established ===
By the early 1930s, increasing public interest in the countryside, coupled with the growing and newly mobile urban population, was generating increasing friction between those seeking access to the countryside and landowners. Alongside of direct action trespasses, such as the mass trespass of Kinder Scout, several voluntary bodies took up the cause of public access in the political arena.

In 1931, Christopher Addison (later Lord Addison) chaired a government committee that proposed a national park authority to choose areas for designation as national parks. A system of national reserves and nature sanctuaries was proposed:

(i) to safeguard areas of exceptional natural interest against (a) disorderly development and (b) spoliation; (ii) to improve the means of access for pedestrians to areas of natural beauty; and (iii) to promote measures for the protection of flora and fauna.

However, no further action was taken after the intervention of the 1931 General Election.

The voluntary Standing Committee on National Parks first met on 26 May 1936 to put the case to the government for national parks in the UK. After World War II, the Labour Party proposed the establishment of national parks as part of the post-war reconstruction of the UK. A report by John Dower, secretary of the Standing Committee on National Parks, to the Minister of Town and Country Planning in 1945 was followed in 1947 by a Government committee, this time chaired by Sir Arthur Hobhouse, which prepared legislation for national parks and proposed 12 national parks. Sir Arthur had this to say on the criteria for designating suitable areas:

"The essential requirements of a National Park are that it should have great natural beauty, a high value for open-air recreation and substantial continuous extent. Further, the distribution of selected areas should as far as practicable be such that at least one of them is quickly accessible from each of the main centres of population in England and Wales. Lastly there is merit in variety and with the wide diversity of landscape which is available in England and Wales, it would be wrong to confine the selection of National Parks to the more rugged areas of mountain and moorland, and to exclude other districts which, though of less outstanding grandeur and wildness, have their own distinctive beauty and a high recreational value."

=== National Parks and Access to the Countryside Act 1949 ===
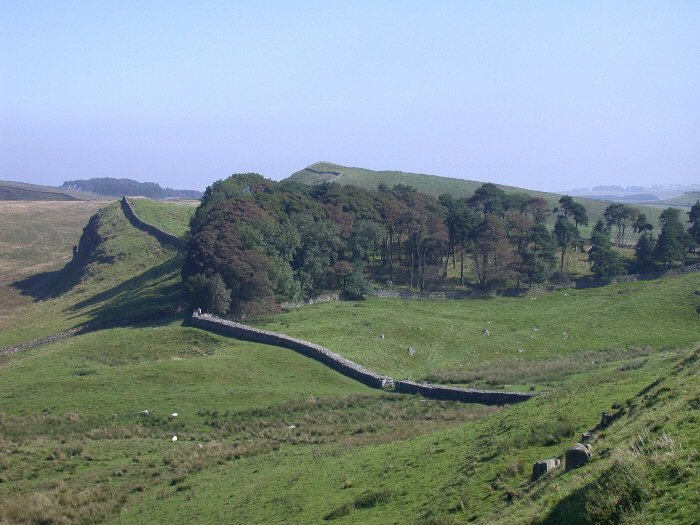
Hadrian's Wall crosses Northumberland National Park

This Act was passed with all party support. The first ten national parks were designated as such in the 1950s in mostly poor-quality agricultural upland. Much of the land was still owned by individual landowners, often private estates, but there was also property owned by public bodies such as the Crown, or charities which allow and encourage access such as the National Trust. Accessibility from the cities was also considered important.

The Peak District, site of the Kinder Scout trespass, was designated the first national park in April 1951 under the Clement Attlee-led Labour administration. This was followed in the same year by the designations of three more national parks: the Lake District, Snowdonia (now Eryri) and Dartmoor. By the end of the decade, numbers of national parks had increased to ten, with the Pembrokeshire Coast, North York Moors, Yorkshire Dales, Exmoor, Northumberland and Brecon Beacons (now Bannau Brycheiniog) national parks all being designated.

Other areas were also considered; for example, parts of the coast of Cornwall were considered as a possible national park in the 1950s, but were thought to be too disparate to form a single coherent national park and were eventually designated as an Area of Outstanding Natural Beauty (AONB) instead. The north Pennines were also considered for designation as a national park in the 1970s but the proposal was thought to be administratively too difficult because the area was administered by five different county councils.

=== Later additions ===
The Norfolk and Suffolk Broads was designated through its own Act of Parliament in 1988, gaining status equivalent to that of a national park. The Broads in East Anglia is not a national park in the strictest sense, being run by a separately-constituted Broads Authority set up by a special Act of Parliament in 1988 and with a structure in which conservation is subordinate to navigational concerns, (Note: See the Sandford Principle below.) but it is generally regarded as being "equivalent to" a national park.

Separate legislation was passed in Scotland, namely the National Parks (Scotland) Act 2000; from this, two Scottish national parks, the Cairngorms and Loch Lomond and The Trossachs, were created.

The New Forest, which includes the largest remaining tracts of unenclosed pasture land, heathland and old-growth forest in the heavily populated South East England, was designated as a national park on 1 March 2005. On 31 March 2009, it was announced that the South Downs would be designated a national park; the South Downs National Park came into effect on 31 March 2010. Of the English and Welsh national parks that were originally proposed, two remain undesignated: the Cambrian Mountains and Cornish Coast.

== List of national parks ==
Of the nine national parks in England, four are in the North of England, two in the South West, one in the North Midlands and two in the South; they cover 10.7% of England. They touch only 16 English counties and there is no national park in the southern Midlands.

There are three national parks in Wales which, together, cover 19.9% of its landmass.

The Cairngorms National Park, at 1,748 sq mi (4,528 km^{2}), is the largest of the national parks. Outside of the Scottish Highlands, the largest is the Lake District National Park which, at 885 sq mi (2,292 km^{2}), is the largest national park in England and the second largest in the UK.

Eryri (Snowdonia National Park), at 827 sq mi (2,142 km^{2}), is the largest national park in Wales and the fourth largest in the United Kingdom. The smallest is The Broads, at 117 sq mi (303 km^{2}).

The total area of the national parks in England and Wales is about 6,282 sq mi (16,271 km^{2}), for an average of 483 sq mi (1,251 km^{2}) but a median of 519 sq mi (1,344 km^{2}). In the UK, the total increases to 8,749 sq mi (22,660 km^{2}), at an average of 583 sq mi (1,511 km^{2}). The most-visited national park is the Lake District, with 15.8 million visitors in 2009, although by visitor days the South Downs at 39 million compares to 23.1 million for the Lake District.

| Name | Photo | Country and counties | Date formed | Area |
|---|---|---|---|---|
| Peak District | | England; Derbyshire, Cheshire, Greater Manchester, Staffordshire, South Yorkshire, West Yorkshire; 53°21′N 1°50′W | 17 April 1951 | 555.2 sq mi (1,438 km^{2}) |
| Lake District | | England; Cumbria; 54°30′N 3°10′W | 9 May 1951 | 884.9 sq mi (2,292 km^{2}) |
| Snowdonia (Eryri) | | Wales; Gwynedd, Conwy; 52°54′N 3°51′W | 18 October 1951 | 827.0 sq mi (2,142 km^{2}) |
| Dartmoor | | England; Devon; 50°34′N 4°0′W | 30 October 1951 | 369.1 sq mi (956 km^{2}) |
| Pembrokeshire Coast (Welsh: Arfordir Penfro) | | Wales; Pembrokeshire; 51°50′N 5°05′W | 29 February 1952 | 239.4 sq mi (620 km^{2}) |
| North York Moors | | England; North Yorkshire; 54°23′N 0°45′W | 29 November 1952 | 554.4 sq mi (1,436 km^{2}) |
| Yorkshire Dales | | England; North Yorkshire, Cumbria, Lancashire; 54°16′N 2°05′W | 16 November 1954 | 841.3 sq mi (2,179 km^{2}) |
| Exmoor | | England; Somerset, Devon; 51°06′N 3°36′W | 19 October 1954 | 267.6 sq mi (693 km^{2}) |
| Northumberland | | England; Northumberland; 55°19′N 2°13′W | 6 April 1956 | 405.0 sq mi (1,049 km^{2}) |
| Brecon Beacons (Bannau Brycheiniog) | | Wales; Blaenau Gwent, Carmarthenshire, Merthyr Tydfil, Powys, Rhondda Cynon Taf, Monmouthshire, Torfaen, Caerphilly; 51°53′N 3°26′W | 17 April 1957 | 521.6 sq mi (1,351 km^{2}) |
| The Broads | | England; Norfolk, Suffolk; 52°43′27″N 1°38′27″E | 1 April 1989 | 117.0 sq mi (303 km^{2}) |
| Loch Lomond and The Trossachs | | Scotland; West Dunbartonshire, Argyll and Bute, Perth and Kinross, Stirling; 56°15′N 4°37′W | 24 April 2002 | 720.1 sq mi (1,865 km^{2}) |
| Cairngorms | | Scotland; Highland, Moray, Aberdeenshire, Angus, Perth and Kinross; 57°5′N 3°40′W | 6 January 2003 | 1,748.3 sq mi (4,528 km^{2}) |
| New Forest | | England; Hampshire, Wiltshire; 50°52′N 1°34′W | 1 March 2005 | 223.9 sq mi (580 km^{2}) |
| South Downs | | England; East Sussex, Hampshire, West Sussex; 50.911°N 0.367°W | 12 November 2009; 2010 (operational) | 633.6 sq mi (1,641 km^{2}) |

=== National parks in England ===
Twelve areas are designated as national parks in England and Wales] the Broads now have 'equivalent status'

Note: Numbers in brackets below align to those on the map

- Peak District (1): The central location of this park provides for the coincidence of the northern limit of many lowland species, such as the stemless thistle and the southern extent of many northern upland species, such as the mountain hare and globe flower. It is located at the southern end of the Pennines, known as the backbone of England. The Carboniferous Limestone of the White Peak in its southern and central areas, gives rise to peaks formed by harder reef limestone and dales rich in wildlife (Note: Typically over 50 species of wildflower and herb per square metre.) gouged out by meltwater from the Ice Age. In the north, east and west is the Dark Peak, where the rocks are shale, sandstone and gritstone and where layers of peat have given rise to stark moorland landscapes.
- Lake District (2): England's largest national park has geology providing a dramatic record of nearly 500 million years, with evidence of colliding continents, deep oceans, tropical seas and one kilometre-thick ice sheets. The area has the largest and deepest lakes, and highest peaks in England. This landscape is overlaid by thousands of years of human activity and the habitats for wildlife to be found in the park include mires, limestone pavement, upland heath, screes and arctic-alpine communities, lakeshore wetlands, estuary, coastal heath and dunes.
- Dartmoor (4): this is the largest and wildest area of open country in the south of England. Granite, intruded 295 million years ago, underlies 65% of the park and is surrounded by sedimentary rocks, including limestones, shales and sandstones belonging to the Carboniferous and Devonian periods. Almost half of the park is moorland and, within it, are four separate national nature reserves; these include the 900 acres (366 ha) East Dartmoor Woods & Heath. There are also over 40 locations designated as Sites of Special Scientific Interest within the national park covering 64,670 acres (26,169 ha). Dartmoor is also home to England's second highest waterfall, Canonteign Falls, and the highest man-made waterfall.
- North York Moors (6): Boasting archaeology dating from the end of the last Ice Age, the park contains the largest Iron Age hill-fort in the North of England, Roman forts, castles and abbeys, moorland crosses and important early industrial sites. Its ancient and varied geology includes the evidence left behind of ancient oceans, huge river deltas and great ice sheets; this has brought geologists to the area for over a century, including figures such as William Smith, "the father of English geology". The area is also famous for its fossils, from ammonites to dinosaur footprints.
- Yorkshire Dales (7): The park straddles the central Pennines. At the Millstone Grit-capped Three Peaks it rises to over 2,300 feet (700 metres), contrasting with its deep cut valleys (dales) from which it derives its name. In the south, the park boasts limestone (Karst) scenery, with its crags, pavements and extensive cave systems, whilst in the north valleys with distinctive stepped profiles are separated by extensive moorland plateaux. A different geology shapes the grassy rounded hills with deep ravines in the west, known as the Howgill Fells. The park is noted for its glacial and post-glacial landforms including the drumlin fields, Norber erratics, and the moraines and post-glacial lakes of Semerwater and Malham Tarn. The park also boasts waterfalls including Hardraw Force and the Aysgarth Falls.
- Exmoor (8): The majority of Exmoor's rocks were formed during the Devonian period of geological history between about 410 and 360 million years ago, the most prominent being old and new red sandstones, Devonian slates, shales and limestone. The park rises to 1,703 ft (519 m) at Dunkery Beacon and boasts 34 mi (55 km) of coastline towards which flow a number of rivers, most notably the river Lyn. In contrast, the Exe flows south and east. A number of settlements are found within the park, including the popular Lynton and Lynmouth.
- Northumberland (9): With a population of around 2,000 people, this is the least populated of all the national parks in England and Wales. Rising to 2,674 feet (815 metres) at The Cheviot, the park contains over 680 mi (1,100 km) of paths for walking, cycling and horse-riding. The park also contains a Ramsar site (an international site for the protection of wetlands) as well as 31 Sites of Special Scientific Interest (SOSI), six Special Areas of Conservation and three national nature reserves. The park's human heritage is no less impressive than its natural diversity, with 259 listed buildings, 432 scheduled monuments and 3,883 Historic Environment Records.
- The Broads (11): Britain's largest nationally protected wetland, the Norfolk and Suffolk Broads is considered to be the 11th member of the national park group, but in fact was designated through its own Act of Parliament in 1988 gaining similar status to a national park. (Note: The Broads is not governed by the Sandford Principle meaning that rights of way and navigation rights are protected. Whilst not strictly a national park the Broads is considered to be a member of the national parks family.) The legislation covering the Broads is unique. The Broads was not established as a national park, but was described at the time as having a 'status equivalent to that of a national park'. It has since adopted the title 'national park' and is a member of the UK national parks family, with the same level of landscape protection and an additional statutory purpose: to protect the interests of navigation. Its rivers, broads, (Note: Broads are shallow lakes.) marshes and fens make this area rich in rare habitats, supporting myriad plants and animals. It is also one of Europe's most popular inland waterways. There are six rivers (Ant, Bure, Chet, Thurne, Waveney and Yare) and 63 broads within the park, comprising over 125 miles (201 km) of navigable waterways. The How Hill National Nature Reserve is wholly contained within the boundaries of the park, as well as 28 SOSI, most of which fall under the Ramsar Convention on Wetlands of International Importance.
- New Forest (12): England's smallest national park was designated as a hunting ground by William the Conqueror almost 1,000 years before it became a national park and has its own section in the Domesday Book of 1086. Originally the term 'forest' referred to the designation as a hunting ground subject to forest law, not to a collection of trees and less than half of the national park today is tree-covered (55,000 acres (22,300 ha)). The rest is heather- and bracken-covered heath, open pasture, marsh, villages and coastline; the park contains the largest remaining lowland heath in Europe, as well as three quarters of Europe's 120 lowland valley mires. 94,000 acres (38,000 ha) of the park is covered by the historic 'Perambulation' in which commoners' rights apply and their animals can roam freely. Amongst the 700 species of wildflower in the forest grow the blue marsh gentian and the bog orchid and the park is the only place in Britain where the wild gladiolus grows. The park is home to five types of deer, all species of British newt, all three native species of British snake, the UK's largest breeding population of the Dartford warbler, the rare southern damselfly with thirty colonies, 13 native species of British bat and the New Forest cicada, rediscovered in 1962. The park also contains a wealth of human history with 214 scheduled monuments.
- South Downs (13): The most recently designated national park in the United Kingdom is a line of hills that run from Winchester in the west to Eastbourne in the east. The underlying geology of the eastern half, from the river Arun to Eastbourne, is mainly hills made of chalk. To the west of the Arun, the area is wider and includes not only chalk hills, but also part of the Weald made of sandstones and clay. Most of the rocks that make up the South Downs were formed 120 million years ago, uplifted by earth movements and pushed up into a huge dome about 125 mi (201 km) long and 50 mi (80 km) wide; this was then worn away to form the North Downs, South Downs and the plain of the Weald. Amongst the key habitats overlaying this geology are chalk grassland, lowland heath and floodplain grazing marsh. The park rises to 919 ft (280 m) at Blackdown in Sussex. The park has the highest population of any national park in the UK which, at 107,929, is bigger than the next two largest combined (Lake District: 42,000 and Peak District: 38,000). The park has a wealth of cultural heritage from evidence in Boxgrove of the earliest humans, through to contemporary arts, such as Edward James' collection of surrealist art at West Dean College. The park contains 600 scheduled monuments, over 5,000 listed buildings, two registered battlefields and 165 conservation areas.

=== National parks in Wales ===
- Snowdonia (3): now officially named Eryri National Park, this is the largest national park in Wales. It includes Snowdon (now officially Yr Wydffa), the highest mountain in the British Isles outside of Scotland, and Llyn Tegid (Bala Lake), Wales' largest lake. The area is steeped in culture and local history, where more than half its population speak Welsh. Fossil shell fragments on the summit of Snowdon date from over 500 million years ago and the ancient 'Harlech Dome', of which Snowdon and Cadair Idris form the northern and southern extents respectively, was created in the Cambrian Period before the volcanoes erupted. The more recent Ice Age glaciers were at their peak 18,000 years ago in Snowdonia and formed the distinctive U-shaped valleys; these include Llanberis and Nant Gwynant in the north and Tal-y-llyn Lake in the south.
- Pembrokeshire Coast (5): The only UK national park recognised primarily for its coastline, it covers almost all the Pembrokeshire Coast, every offshore island, the Daugleddau estuary, and large areas of the Preseli Hills and the Gwaun Valley. It is an ecologically-rich area, recognised as of international importance for a wide range of high quality habitats and rare species. The park contains 13 Special Areas of Conservation, five Special Protection Areas, one of three UK marine nature reserves and seven national nature reserves, as well as 60 SOSIs. The park also contains a wealth of human history and culture, including the UK's smallest city, St Davids, and Iron Age forts. Within the park, there are also a total of sixty geological conservation sites ranging from small roadside quarries and isolated crags on hilltops to many miles of coastline.
- Brecon Beacons (10): now officially named Bannau Brycheiniog National Park. The last of the original ten national parks to have been designated in the 1950s, it straddles the divide between rural mid Wales and industrial South Wales. It was formed from sedimentary rocks from the mid-Ordovician through to the late Carboniferous; however, it is the Devonian Old Red Sandstone, which is the rock most identified with the park since it forms the larger part of the different mountain massifs, including South Wales' highest point, Pen y Fan, at 2,907 ft (886 m). Like many other upland national parks in the UK, it is glacial activity during the Quaternary ice ages, which is responsible for many of the well-known landforms. The west of the park is also designated as Fforest Fawr Geopark, in recognition of its geological interest and includes Waterfall Country. A number of former tramroads and the Monmouthshire and Brecon Canal running down the Usk Valley, dating from the Industrial Revolution, now serve as recreational facilities.

=== National parks in Scotland ===
- Loch Lomond and The Trossachs: This is the fourth largest in the UK, includes 21 Munros (including Ben Lomond, Ben Lui, Beinn Challuim and Ben More, with two peaks called Ben Vorlich) and 20 Corbetts. There are two forest parks (Queen Elizabeth Forest Park and Argyll Forest Park) and two national nature reserves.
- Cairngorms: The largest national park in the UK, the heart of it is the eponymous mountain range, the Cairngorms, but these mountains form only one part of it. Other hill ranges that are part of it include the Angus Glens and the Monadhliath, and lower areas like Strathspey and upper Deeside. Three major rivers rise in the park: the Spey, the Dee and the Don.

=== Proposed national parks in Northern Ireland ===
There are currently no national parks in Northern Ireland, although there have been controversial moves to establish one in the Mourne Mountains. If established, it would stretch from Carlingford Lough to Newcastle and Slieve Croob. Other areas were also considered as feasible or "likely" national parks between 2011 and 2012, including the Causeway Coast, the Antrim Glens, the Sperrins and Fermanagh Lakelands. Alex Attwood, Northern Ireland Minister of the Environment, had hoped to create two national parks following consultations in 2012.

== Development and land use planning in national parks ==
National park authorities are the strategic and local planning authorities for their areas, so that the local district or unitary councils do not exercise planning control in an area covered by a national park. Consequently, they have to perform all the duties of a local planning authority.

They are responsible for maintaining the local development framework, the spatial planning guide for their area; they also grant planning consent for development, within the constraints of the Framework. This gives them very strong direct control over residential and industrial development, the design of buildings and other structures, as well as strategic matters, such as mineral extraction.

The national park authorities' planning powers vary only slightly from other authorities, but the policies and their interpretation are stricter than elsewhere. This is supported and encouraged by the government who regard:

"National park designation as conferring the highest status of protection as far as landscape and scenic beauty are concerned."

== Contribution to the local economy ==
Tourism is an important part of the economy of the regions which contain national parks. Through attractions, shops and accommodation, visitors provide an income and a livelihood to local employers and farmers. This income provides jobs for the park; for example, within the Peak District National Park, the estimate in 2019 for visitor spending is £730 million, which supports over 10,382 jobs, representing 27% of total employment in the national park. A total of 12.64 million visitor days were recorded in 2019.

== Conflicts in national parks ==
The national park authorities have two roles: to conserve and enhance the park, and to promote its use by visitors. These two objectives cause frequent conflicts between the needs of different groups of people. It is estimated that the national parks of England and Wales receive 110 million visitors each year. Most of the time, it is possible to achieve both the original two purposes by good management. Occasionally, a situation arises where access for the public is in direct conflict with conservation; following the ethos of the Sandford Principle, the Environment Act 1995 sets down how a priority may be established between conservation and recreational use. Similar provision has been made for Scottish national parks.

Although recreation and tourism bring many benefits to an area, they can also bring a number of problems. The national funding offered to national park authorities is partly in recognition of the extra difficulties created in dealing with these conflicts.

Congestion of villages and beauty spots:
Some of the most popular "honeypot" areas attract large numbers of visitors, resulting in overcrowded car parks, blocked roads and overstretched local facilities, particularly on Sundays in the summer and on bank holidays. Examples include the areas near Keswick in the Lake District, Castleton and Bakewell in the Peak District, and Betws-y-Coed in Snowdonia (Eryri).

Erosion:
Hill-walking and use of other public rights-of-way is an extremely popular use of all the national parks. Heavy use of the most popular paths leads to considerable erosion, but strengthening of paths can be unsightly. Particularly heavy wear is caused by sponsored walks, walks promoted by national books and magazines; by horse riding on unsurfaced bridleways; mountain biking; and use of off-road vehicles on green lanes; examples include Dovedale in the Peak District and Tilberthwaite in the Lake District. Over-grazing, such as by sheep on hill and moorland areas, can also reduce vegetation, leading to increased erosion.

Damage and disturbance to wildlife:
Wildlife may be disturbed by the level of use within some of the areas of the parks that are open to the public. Moorland and chalk downland is easily damaged by regular use, and takes many years to recover. Moorland birds in particular nest and roost on the ground and are therefore especially sensitive. Dog walking, orienteering, mountain biking and hang gliding are typical activities which are likely to cause disturbance to nesting birds.

Litter:
As well as being unsightly, litter can also cause pollution, and harm to livestock and wild animals. Broken glass is a danger to people and, by focusing the rays of the sun, a possible cause of fire, particularly in areas of moorland such as Exmoor, parts of the Peak District and the North York Moors.

Damage to farmland:
Trampling of grass meadows reduces the amount of winter feed for farm animals. Walkers who stray from footpaths may climb over fences or dry stone walls rather than looking out for the stiles that often mark the course of footpaths across farmland. Sheep can be injured or even killed by dogs not under proper control, especially at lambing time.

Local community displacement:
Gift shops and cafés which cater for the needs of tourists are often more profitable than shops selling everyday goods for local people, such as butchers or bakers. In some villages, where tourist shops are in the majority and there are few shops catering for the local people, the local community may feel pushed out by tourists. Houses are often very expensive in tourist villages, as there is demand for them as second or holiday homes, making them unaffordable for local people. This is a particular problem in areas within easy commuting distance of large cities, such as the Peak District, the Lake District, the Yorkshire Dales, the New Forest and South Downs.

Conflict between recreational users:
Some forms of use of national parks interfere with other uses; for example, use of high-speed boats causes noise pollution and conflicts with other uses, such as boat trips, yachting, canoeing and swimming. A bylaw imposing a 10 kn (12 mph) speed limit came into force on Windermere on 29 March 2005, which effectively prohibited speedboats and water skiing in the Lake District. Of the 16 larger lakes in the Lake District, only Windermere, Coniston Water, Derwentwater and Ullswater have a public right of navigation; speed limits were imposed on the three lakes other than Windermere in the 1970s and 1980s.

== Other designated landscapes ==
The United Kingdom has a number of other designated landscape areas besides its national parks. Most similar to the parks are National Landscapes (formerly known as Areas of Outstanding Natural Beauty), which differ in part because of their more limited opportunities for extensive outdoor recreation. As national parks, Dartmoor, the Lake District, North York Moors and the Yorkshire Dales are not also separately listed as national landscapes; the coasts of Exmoor and the North York Moors coincide with heritage coasts.

All of the parks contain Sites of Special Scientific Interest and national nature reserves in varying numbers. A part of the Bannau Brycheiniog (Brecon Beacons) national park is also designated as one of the UNESCO Global Geoparks. Of the various World Heritage Sites in England and Wales, only the Lake District is wholly coincident with a national park. A part of the Blaenavon Industrial Landscape World Heritage Site falls within the Bannau Brycheiniog, with parts of the Castles and Town Walls of King Edward in Gwynedd and of the Slate Landscape of North-West Wales lie within Snowdonia National Park (Eryri).

== See also ==
- List of national parks
- Campaign for National Parks
- Geology of national parks in Britain
- List of World Heritage Sites of the United Kingdom
- National Landscape
