= Television Licences (Disclosure of Information) Act 2000 =

Act of the Parliament of the United Kingdom

Television Licences (Disclosure of Information) Act 2000 (Note: Section 7(1).)
- Act of Parliament
- Parliament of the United Kingdom
- Long title: An Act to make provision about the disclosure of certain information for purposes connected with television licences.
- Citation: 2000 c. 15
- Territorial extent: United Kingdom (Note: Section 7(2).)

Dates
- Royal assent: 20 July 2000
- Commencement: 20 July 2000 (Note: Section 4(b) of the Interpretation Act 1978.)
Other legislation
Amended by	Communications Act 2003; Veterans Advisory and Pensions Committees Act 2023

Status: Amended

Text of statute as originally enacted

Revised text of statute as amended

The Television Licences (Disclosure of Information) Act 2000 (c. 15) is an act of the Parliament of the United Kingdom.

== Background ==
The policy of giving certain pensioners free television licences was announced in the 2000 United Kingdom budget.

== Provisions ==
It allows social security information to be provided by the government in order to facilitate no fee or fee-reduced TV licences.

== Further developments ==
The act was amended in 2022 to make the process of applying for the concessionary licence fee simpler for users.

== Reception ==
Age Concern supported the policy of giving free television licences to pensioners.

== Bibliography ==
- Halsbury's Statutes
- "Television Licences (Disclosure of Information) Act 2000". Current Law Statutes 2000. Sweet & Maxwell. London. W Green. Edinburgh. 2000. Volume 1. Chapter 15. pp 15-1 to 15-4.
