= Sandford principle =

The Sandford principle is a concept in the management of protected landscapes in the United Kingdom. The name derives from Lord Sandford who chaired the National Parks Policy Review Committee which reviewed national parks of England and Wales between 1971 and 1974.

National Park Authorities can do much to reconcile public enjoyment with the preservation of natural beauty by good planning and management and the main emphasis must continue to be on this approach wherever possible. But even so, there will be situations where the two purposes are irreconcilable... Where this happens, priority must be given to the conservation of natural beauty.

— Lord Sandford, 1974

The two purposes of national parks are, in short,

1. conservation of the natural environment and
2. access for the public.

A duty of national park authorities which was subsequently introduced was to 'foster the economic and social well-being of local communities within the national park'.

The purposes were amended by the Environment Act 1995. They are now, firstly, to conserve and enhance the natural beauty, wildlife and cultural heritage of the area and, secondly, to promote opportunities for the understanding and enjoyment of the special qualities of the area by the public.

Most of the time it is possible to achieve both the original two purposes by good management. Occasionally a situation arises where access for the public is in direct conflict with conservation. Following the ethos of the Sandford principle, the Environment Act 1995 sets down how a priority may be established between conservation and recreational use. Similar provision has been made for Scottish national parks.

The Sandford principle is often misquoted as "conservation has priority over recreation"; however, importantly, it is better summarised as, "where those two purposes cannot be reconciled by skilful management, conservation should come first".

The Sandford principle was first used in UK national park management, and is still most commonly encountered in that context. However, where this dilemma has occurred in the management of other sites where public pressure and wildlife conservation might be in conflict, the principle is sometimes cited.

== The impact of the Environment Act 1995 ==
Key words in the 1974 National Parks Policy Review Committee report are 'priority must be given to the conservation of natural beauty.' Although these words have been used in policy-making and decisions for many years, they were not a legal statement. When the principle was eventually translated into law in 1995, its interpretation and impact were subtly changed.

The Environment Act 1995 s62 (1)(2) states:

In exercising or performing any functions in relation to, or so as to affect, land in a National Park, any relevant authority shall have regard to the purposes specified in subsection (1) of section five of this Act and, if it appears that there is a conflict between those purposes, shall attach greater weight to the purpose of conserving and enhancing the natural beauty, wildlife and cultural heritage of the area comprised in the National Park.

This wording enshrines in law the issue at the heart of the Sandford principle, and hence, since 1995, consideration of the Sandford Principle has only been possible through the Environment Act. This is an important distinction because the Environment Act expresses the issue in more equitable terms by saying that the national park authority shall attach ‘greater weight to the purpose of conserving....’ rather than the phrase ‘priority must be given’ as used by Sandford and which was more absolute and directly in favour of conservation.

Use of the term ‘greater weight’ indicates clearly that evidence must be collected and weighed when deciding where public enjoyment might be considered a less desirable purpose than conservation. The word ‘purpose’ is significant in that it places a legal requirement on the national park authority to consider and demonstrate why it is conserving and enhancing the natural beauty, rather than doing so for no particular reason or simply suggesting an arbitrary priority.
