= City of Newcastle upon Tyne Act 2000 =

United Kingdom legislation

- Act of Parliament
- Parliament of the United Kingdom
- Long title: An Act to confer powers on the Council of the City of Newcastle upon Tyne for the better control of street trading in the city of Newcastle; for the registration of door supervisors and second-hand goods dealers in the city; for controlling the distribution of free literature in the city; and for other purposes.
- Citation: 2000 c. viii

Dates
- Royal assent: 21 December 2000

Text of statute as originally enacted

The City of Newcastle upon Tyne Act 2000 (c. viii) is an act to confer certain powers on the Council of the City of Newcastle upon Tyne.

== Provisions ==
The act prohibited unlicensed street trading in the streets near Newcastle Arena.

The act established a registration scheme of door supervisors and second-hand goods dealers.

The act prohibited the unlicensed distribution of free literature in the city.

== Further developments ==
The restriction on free literature was subsequently superseded by the Clean Neighbourhoods and Environment Act 2005.
