= Census (Amendment) (Scotland) Act 2019 =

Act of the Scottish Parliament

- Act of the Scottish Parliament
- Scottish Parliament
- Long title: An Act of the Scottish Parliament to amend the Census Act 1920 to enable particulars about transgender status and history and sexual orientation to be gathered voluntarily.
- Citation: 2019 asp 12
- Introduced by: Fiona Hyslop MSP, Cabinet Secretary for Culture, Tourism and External Affairs
- Territorial extent: Scotland

Dates
- Royal assent: 18 July 2019
Other legislation
Relates to	Census Act 1920

Status: Current legislation

Text of statute as originally enacted

Text of the Census (Amendment) (Scotland) Act 2019 as in force today (including any amendments) within the United Kingdom, from legislation.gov.uk.

The Census (Amendment) (Scotland) Act 2019 (asp 12) is an act of the Scottish Parliament. The act made provisions for the inclusion of sexual orientation and transgender status in the Census.

== Provisions ==
The provisions of the Act include:

- Amending the Census Act 1920 to add sections regarding transgender status and sexual orientation which would add questions on these topics to the next census.

== See also ==
- United Kingdom census, 2021
- Census (Return Particulars and Removal of Penalties) Act 2019 - a similar Act for England, Wales and Northern Ireland
