= Census Act (Northern Ireland) 1969 =

- Act of Parliament
- Parliament of Northern Ireland
- Long title: An Act to make provision for the taking from time to time of a census for Northern Ireland and for otherwise collecting statistical information.
- Citation: 1969 c. 8 (N.I.)

Dates
- Royal assent: 24 June 1969
- Commencement: 24 June 1969

Other legislation
- Amended by: Fines and Penalties (Northern Ireland) Order 1984; SI 1991/? (NI 5); Northern Ireland (Modification of Enactments—No. 1) Order 1999; Law Reform (Miscellaneous Provisions) (Northern Ireland) Order 2005; Census (Return Particulars and Removal of Penalties) Act 2019
- Relates to: Census Act 1920

Status: Amended

Text of the Census Act (Northern Ireland) 1969 as in force today (including any amendments) within the United Kingdom, from legislation.gov.uk.

The Census Act (Northern Ireland) 1969 (1969 c. 8 (N.I.)) is an act of the Parliament of Northern Ireland, concerning the census. The act shares similarities with the Census Act 1920 which provides for censuses in England, Scotland, and Wales. It remains the primary legislation for conducting censuses in Northern Ireland.

== Background ==
Before the passage of the act, there had never been a voluntary question within the census in Northern Ireland.

== Provisions ==
In 1984, it was determined by the Director of Public Prosecutions, that magistrates' courts have no jurisdiction to hear prosecutions brought under section 7(2)(a) the act, because these complaints are required to be brought within 6 months of the commission of the offence.

=== Schedule ===
The schedule to the act lists the 'Matters in respect of which particulars may be required'. They are:

1. Names, sex, age.
2. Occupation, profession, trade or employment.
3. Nationality, birthplace, race, language.
4. Place of abode and character of dwelling.
5. Condition as to marriage, relation to head of family, issue.
6. Education, professional and technical qualifications.
7. Religion.
8. Any other matters with respect to which it is desirable to obtain statistical information with a view to ascertaining the social condition of the population.

== See also ==
- Census in the United Kingdom
