= National Parks and Access to the Countryside Act 1949 =

Act of the Parliament of the United Kingdom

National Parks and Access to the Countryside Act 1949 (Note: Section 115(1).)
- Act of Parliament
- Parliament of the United Kingdom
- Long title: An Act to make provision for National Parks and the establishment of a National Parks Commission; to confer on the Nature Conservancy and local authorities powers for the establishment and maintenance of nature reserves; to make further provision for the recording, creation, maintenance and improvement of public paths and for securing access to open country, and to amend the law relating to rights of way; to confer further powers for preserving and enhancing natural beauty; and for matters connected with the purposes aforesaid.
- Citation: 12, 13 & 14 Geo. 6. c. 97
- Introduced by: Sir Arthur Hobhouse
- Territorial extent: England and Wales; Scotland; (Note: Section 115(2).)

Dates
- Royal assent: 16 December 1949
- Commencement: 16 December 1949 (Note: The Acts of Parliament (Commencement) Act 1793.)
Other legislation
Amends	Rights of Way Act 1932
Repeals/revokes	Access to Mountains Act 1939
Amended by	Highways Act 1959; Land Compensation Act 1961; Water Resources Act 1963; Land Compensation (Scotland) Act 1963; Science and Technology Act 1965; Countryside Act 1968; Post Office Act 1969; Courts Act 1971; Acquisition of Land Act 1981; Countryside and Rights of Way Act 2000; Abolition of Feudal Tenure etc. (Scotland) Act 2000; Manufacture and Storage of Explosives Regulations 2005; Natural Resources Body for Wales (Functions) Order 2013
Relates to	Countryside and Rights of Way Act 2000; Natural Environment and Rural Communities Act 2006; Wildlife and Countryside Act 1981

Status: Amended

History of passage through Parliament

Records of Parliamentary debate relating to the statute from Hansard, at TheyWorkForYou

Records of Parliamentary debate relating to the statute from Hansard

Text of statute as originally enacted

Revised text of statute as amended

Text of the National Parks and Access to the Countryside Act as in force today (including any amendments) within the United Kingdom, from legislation.gov.uk.

The National Parks and Access to the Countryside Act 1949 (12, 13 & 14 Geo. 6. c. 97) is an act of the Parliament of the United Kingdom which created the National Parks Commission which later became the Countryside Commission (later Countryside Council for Wales in Wales) and then the Countryside Agency in England, later merging with English Nature to form Natural England in 2006. The act provided the framework for the creation of National Parks and Areas of Outstanding Natural Beauty in England and Wales, and also addressed public rights of way and access to open land.

== Background ==
The act was passed in 1949 with all-party support, as part of the reconstruction of the UK by the Labour government after World War II.

The act followed reports by:

- a government committee chaired by Christopher Addison (later Viscount Addison) in 1931,
- John Dower, secretary of the Standing Committee on National Parks, to the Minister of Town and Country Planning in 1945, and
- a government committee chaired by Sir Arthur Hobhouse in 1947, which proposed 12 national parks.

== National parks ==
The first 10 British national parks were designated as such in the 1950s under the act in mostly poor-quality agricultural upland. An eleventh 'national park' in the Norfolk and Suffolk Broads was set up by a special Act of Parliament, the Norfolk and Suffolk Broads Act, in 1988. Strictly speaking, this is not a national park, but the differences are sufficiently small that this entity is always regarded as being "equivalent to" a national park. The New Forest was designated a national park on 1 March 2005. The South Downs, the last of the 12 areas chosen in the 1947 Hobhouse Report, was designated as South Downs National Park by the Secretary of State Hilary Benn in March 2009, making 15 national parks in total.

== Amendments ==
The structure set up by the National Parks and Access to the Countryside Act 1949 was amended by:

- the Environmental Protection Act 1990, which created the Nature Conservancy Council (which later became Natural England and transferred functions of the Countryside Commission in Wales to the Countryside Council for Wales)
- the Environment Act 1995, under which each national park is now operated by its own National Park Authority
- the Countryside and Rights of Way Act 2000, under which AONBs are now designated

Further amendments are made by the Natural Environment and Rural Communities Act 2006, under which English Nature, the Countryside Agency and the Rural Development Service merged on 1 October 2006 to form new bodies called Natural England and the Commission for Rural Communities.

== See also ==
- National parks of the United Kingdom
- National parks of England and Wales
- Area of Outstanding Natural Beauty

== Bibliography ==
- R. N. Hutchins and H. F. Full. The National Parks and Access to the Countryside Act 1949. (Butterworths Annotated Legislation Service: Statutes Supplement No. 65). Butterworth & Co (Publishers) Ltd. 1950. Reviewed at "Legal Literature" (1951) 101 The Law Journal 12 (5 January 1951) and (1951) 211 The Law Times 39 (19 January 1951)
- Norman Browning. National Parks and Access to the Countryside. Thames Bank Publishing Company. 1950. Google
- Blunden and Curry. A People's Charter? Forty Years of the National Parks and Access to the Countryside Act 1949. HMSO. 1990. Google
- Ann Holt. A Charter for Whom? The Access Provisions of the National Parks and Access to the Countryside Act, 1949. Ramblers' Association. 1990.
- "The National Parks and Access to the Countryside Act 1949". Halsbury's Statutes of England. Second Edition. Butterworth & Company (Publishers) Ltd. 1950. Volume 42. Pages 465 and 890.
- "The National Parks and Access to the Countryside Act 1949". Halsbury's Statutes of England. Third Edition. Butterworths. 1970. Volume 24. Page 65. See also Preliminary Note at p 29.
- Desmond Heap. "National Parks and Access to the Countryside Act, 1949". Encyclopedia of the Law of Town and Country Planning. Sweet & Maxwell. 1959. Paragraphs 2–465 to 2–595. Google
- Guy Seward. "National Parks and Access to the Countryside Act 1949". Howard Roberts on the Law of Town and Country Planning. Second Edition. Charles Knight & Co. 1963. Volume 2. Pages 761 to 844.
- Andrew Waite. "National Parks and Access to the Countryside Act 1949". Butterworths Environmental Law Handbook. 1994. Page 3. Google
- Michael J. Fry. "National Parks and Access to the Countryside Act 1949". A Manual of Nature Conservation Law. Clarendon Press. 1995. Page 5. Google
- Stephen Chapman. "The National Parks and Access to the Countryside Act, 1949". Statutes on the Law of Torts. Butterworths. 1962. Page 345.
- John Sheail. "The National Parks and Access to the Countryside Act of 1949 – its Origins and Significance". T C Smout (ed). Nature, Landscape and People since the Second World War. Tuckwell Press. 2001. Chapter 1. Pages 1 to 12. Google
- Tom Stephenson. Ann Holt (ed). "The National Parks and Access to the Countryside Act 1949". Forbidden Land: The Struggle for Access to Mountain and Moorland. Manchester University Press. 1989. Chapter 11. Pages 206 to 222.
- Peter Bromley. "National Parks and Access to the Countryside Act (1949)". Countryside Management. Taylor & Francis. 1990. Digital Printing. 2006. Chapter 3.2. Pages 42 to 49.
- "National Parks" (1950) 28 The Canadian Bar Review 452
- "The National Parks and Access to the Countryside Act, 1949" (1950) 210 The Law Times 147 (15 September 1950)
