= Census (Amendment) Act 2000 =

Act of the Parliament of the United Kingdom

Census (Amendment) Act 2000 (Note: Section 2(1).)
- Act of Parliament
- Parliament of the United Kingdom
- Long title: An Act to amend the Census Act 1920 to enable particulars to be required in respect of religion.
- Citation: 2000 c. 24
- Introduced by: Jonathan Sayeed (Commons); Lord Weatherill (Lords)
- Territorial extent: England and Wales (Note: Section 2(2).)

Dates
- Royal assent: 28 July 2000
- Commencement: 28 July 2000 (Note: Section 4(b) of the Interpretation Act 1978.)
Other legislation
Amends	Census Act 1920
Relates to	Census Act (Northern Ireland) 1969

Status: Current legislation

Text of statute as originally enacted

Revised text of statute as amended

Census (Amendment) (Scotland) Act 2000 (Note: Section 2.)
- Act of the Scottish Parliament
- Scottish Parliament
- Long title: An Act of the Scottish Parliament to amend the Census Act 1920 to enable particulars about religion to be gathered.
- Citation: 2000 asp 3
- Introduced by: Jim Wallace
- Territorial extent: Scotland

Dates
- Royal assent: 10 April 2000
- Commencement: 10 April 2000
Other legislation
Amends	Census Act 1920
Relates to	Census Act (Northern Ireland) 1969

Status: Current legislation

History of passage through the Parliament

Text of statute as originally enacted

Revised text of statute as amended

The Census (Amendment) Act 2000 (c. 24) is an act of the Parliament of the United Kingdom. The act was passed alongside the Census (Amendment) (Scotland) Act 2000 (asp 3), which is an act of the Scottish Parliament, respectively. They introduced a question on the religion of respondents to the censuses of Great Britain.

== Motivation ==
The inclusion of a question on religion was recommended in a white paper of March 1999. Parliament has indicated that inclusion of a question on religion was to provide useful demographics information for six key areas, namely "discrimination and racial disadvantage, social exclusion, health and community care planning, religious education in schools, regeneration of the inner cities, and helping voluntary sector religious groups".

== Legislation ==
=== England and Wales ===
The Census (Amendment) Act 2000 was passed as a private member's bill in the Parliament of the United Kingdom. The purpose was to provide for the asking of a question on religion in the census of England and Wales. Amendments were made to the original bill by the House of Lords so that no person was to be subject to a penalty for refusing or neglecting to provide details in response to such a question.

=== Scotland ===
The Scottish Executive brought forward similar legislation, the Census (Amendment) (Scotland) Act 2000. The bill was originally introduced by Jim Wallace and passed through the Parliament, receiving royal assent on 10 April 2000, with similar provisions for the inclusion of a question on religion in the census of Scotland. The Scottish act also provided that a person would not be penalised for failing or refusing to declare a religion in the census.

=== Northern Ireland ===
A similar amendment to census legislation was not required in Northern Ireland, as the Census Act (Northern Ireland) 1969 already included provisions for the taking of particulars of religion. All censuses in Ireland have included a question on religion since 1861.

== See also ==
- Census in the United Kingdom
- Religion in the United Kingdom
