= National Parks (Scotland) Act 2000 =

Act of the Scottish Parliament

National Parks (Scotland) Act 2000 (Note: Section 37(3).)
- Act of the Scottish Parliament
- Scottish Parliament
- Long title: An Act of the Scottish Parliament to make provision for National Parks.
- Citation: 2000 asp 10
- Introduced by: Sarah Boyack
- Territorial extent: Scotland

Dates
- Royal assent: 9 August 2000
- Commencement: 8 September 2000 (Note: Section 37(1). The National Parks (Scotland) Act 2000 (Commencement) Order 2000 (SI 2000/312).)
Other legislation
Amends	Local Government (Scotland) Act 1966; Town and Country Planning (Scotland) Act 1997
Amended by	Scottish Public Services Ombudsman Act 2002

Status: Amended

History of passage through the Parliament

Text of statute as originally enacted

Revised text of statute as amended

Text of the National Parks (Scotland) Act 2000 as in force today (including any amendments) within the United Kingdom, from legislation.gov.uk.

The National Parks (Scotland) Act 2000 (asp 10) is an act of the Scottish Parliament.

== Background ==
Before the act was passed Scotland did not have any national parks.

== Provisions ==
It sets out four main aims of the national parks of Scotland. It also lays out criteria for what qualifies a park for national park status, and the process necessary to create such features. The act in itself does not establish any new national parks; it merely creates powers for the designation of national parks.

== Aims of national parks ==
Taken from the National Parks (Scotland) Act 2000:

- "to conserve and enhance the natural and cultural heritage of the area."
- "to promote sustainable use of the natural resources of the area."
- "to promote understanding and enjoyment (including enjoyment in the form of recreation) of the special qualities of the area by the public."
- "to promote sustainable economic and social development of the area's communities."

== Further developments ==
The first national park to be designated under the act was Loch Lomond and The Trossachs National Park on 1 July 2002.

== Reception ==
The act received unanimous support in the Scottish Parliament.
