= Census Act 1920 =

Act of the Parliament of the United Kingdom

Census Act 1920 (Note: Section 10(1).)
- Act of Parliament
- Parliament of the United Kingdom
- Long title: An Act to make provision for the taking from time to time of a Census for Great Britain or any area therein and for otherwise obtaining Statistical Information with respect to the Population of Great Britain.
- Citation: 10 & 11 Geo. 5. c. 41
- Territorial extent: England and Wales; Scotland; (Note: Section 10(2).)

Dates
- Royal assent: 16 August 1920
- Commencement: 16 August 1920 (Note: The Acts of Parliament (Commencement) Act 1793.)
Other legislation
Amended by	Local Government (Scotland) Act 1947; Census (Confidentiality) Act 1991; Statute Law (Repeals) Act 1993; Census (Amendment) Act 2000; Census (Amendment) (Scotland) Act 2000; Census (Amendment) (Scotland) Act 2019
Relates to	Census Act (Northern Ireland) 1969

Status: Amended

Text of statute as originally enacted

Revised text of statute as amended

Text of the Census Act 1920 as in force today (including any amendments) within the United Kingdom, from legislation.gov.uk.

The Census Act 1920 (10 & 11 Geo. 5. c. 41) is an act of the Parliament of the United Kingdom. Providing for a census for Great Britain (or any subsidiary part of it), on a date to be fixed by Order in Council, it remains the primary legislation for the provision of the UK census in England, Scotland, and Wales. A minimum of five years is required between censuses.

== Parts of the act ==
1. Power to direct taking of census.
2. Duty of Registrar-General to carry out census, and provision for expenses.
3. Regulations with respect to proceedings for taking census.
4. Preparation of reports and abstracts.
5. Preparation of statistics in respect of periods between one census and another.
6. Provision with respect to local census.
7. Expenses of local authorities.
8. Penalties.
9. Application to Scotland.
10. Short title and extent.

=== Schedule ===
The schedule to the act lists the 'Matters in respect of which particulars may be required'. They are:

1. Names, sex, age.
2. Occupation, profession, trade or employment.
3. Nationality, birthplace, race, language.
4. Place of abode and character of dwelling.
5. Condition as to marriage, relation to head of family, issue born in marriage.
6. Any other matters with respect to which it is desirable to obtain statistical information with a view to ascertaining the social or civil condition of the population.

Religion was added at 5A in the Schedule by the Census (Amendment) Act 2000 (c. 24) in England and Wales, and the Census (Amendment) (Scotland) Act 2000 in Scotland. The 2000 amendment also added a clause in Section 8 of the 1920 Act to make the provision of religion optional:

no person shall be liable to a penalty under subsection (1) for refusing or neglecting to state any particulars in respect of religion

== See also ==
- Census in the United Kingdom
- Census Act (Northern Ireland) 1969 (c. 8 N.I.), similar legislation for Northern Ireland
- Census (Confidentiality) Act 1991 (c. 6), amendments to Section 8
- Census (Amendment) (Scotland) Act 2019, Scottish amendment that makes provisions for questions on transgender status and sexual orientation.

== Bibliography ==
- Oliver & Boyd's new Edinburgh almanac and national repository for the year 1921, p. 228
