= Annaduff =

Annaduff may refer to a number of places in Ireland, including:

- Annaduff, County Leitrim, a civil parish, electoral division and townland in the historical barony of Leitrim
- Aughanduff, County Armagh, a village and townland in the historical barony of Orior Upper
