= Aughanduff =

Village in County Armagh, Northern Ireland

Aughanduff Áth an Daimh
- Village
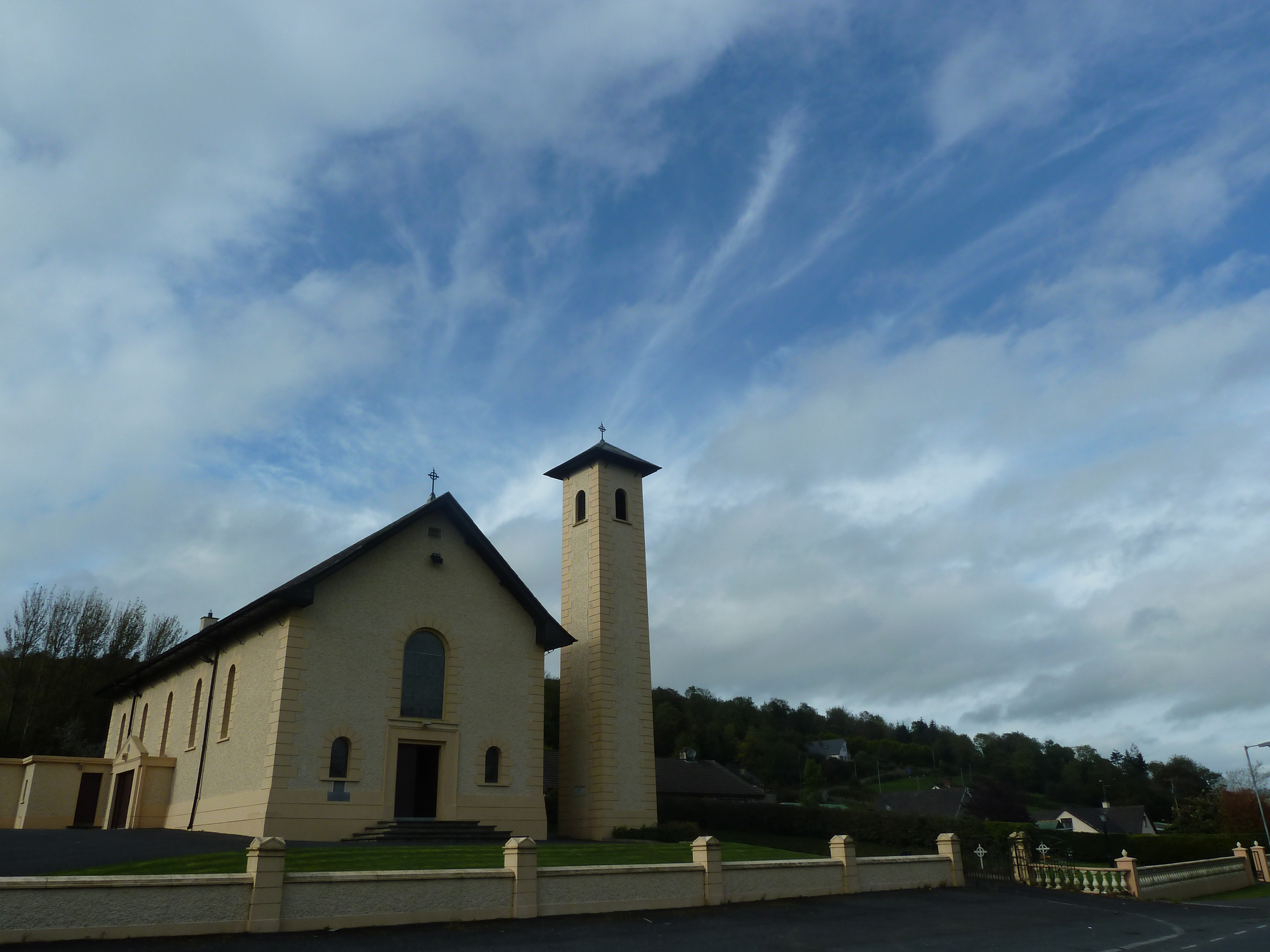
- Church of Our Lady, Queen of Peace, Aughanduff

- Location in Northern Ireland
- Coordinates: 54°09′04″N 6°30′47″W
- Country: Northern Ireland
- Province: Ulster
- County: Armagh
- Elevation: 234 m (768 ft)

Population (2011 est.)
  - Rural: 200
- Time zone: UTC+0 (WET)
  - Summer (DST): UTC-1 (IST (WEST))
- Postcode area: BT35
- Post town: BELFAST
- Area code: +00442830[878XXX][888XXX]
- Irish Grid Reference: H969221
- Newry distance: East 9 miles (14 km)

Aughanduff (from Irish Áth an Daimh 'ford of the oxen') is a small hamlet and townland in the civil parish of Forkhill, in the former barony of Orior Upper, and County of Armagh, Northern Ireland. The townland is roughly co-existent with Upper and Lower Aughanduff Mountains, both of which form part of the outer Ring of Gullion geological formation, the most spectacular example of a ring-dyke intrusion in Ireland or Britain, and was the first ring dyke in the world to be geologically mapped. Aughanduff has been populated since prehistoric times and has been recorded as a distinct district since at least the early 1600s.

The area's history is both well documented and reflects its location both in rural Ireland and on the borderlands of the Pale, the Plantation of Ulster, and latterly Northern Ireland; indeed, part of the district's northern boundary was proposed for forming part of the northern border of the Irish Free State by the Irish Boundary Commission in its final report of 1925. The Boundary Commission's report was never implemented and today, the area remains within Northern Ireland, some five miles from the border with the Republic of Ireland. Prominent in the hill country of southern Armagh, Aughanduff boasts views of six counties on a clear day, part of the area has been designated by the Northern Ireland Environment Agency as an Area of Special Scientific Interest, and the district forms part of the western element of Ring of Gullion Area of Outstanding Natural Beauty.

== Etymology ==
"Aughanduff" (also spelt "Annduff") is commonly said to derive from the Irish Áth an Daimh, meaning "ford of the oxen" (or "oxford"), with the relevant ford being one across Balina stream which separates the townland from neighbouring Carricknagavina. It has also been argued, however, that the name comes from the Irish Achadh Dubh meaning "black fields". The spelling used for official purposes is Aughanduff, and the area is commonly pronounced Ann-duff.

The modern English spelling Aughanduff appears to have emerged during the 18th century, and the Northern Ireland Place-Names Project records the following spellings being used in official documents or maps prior to Aughanduff being used in John Rocque's 1760 Map of County Armagh:

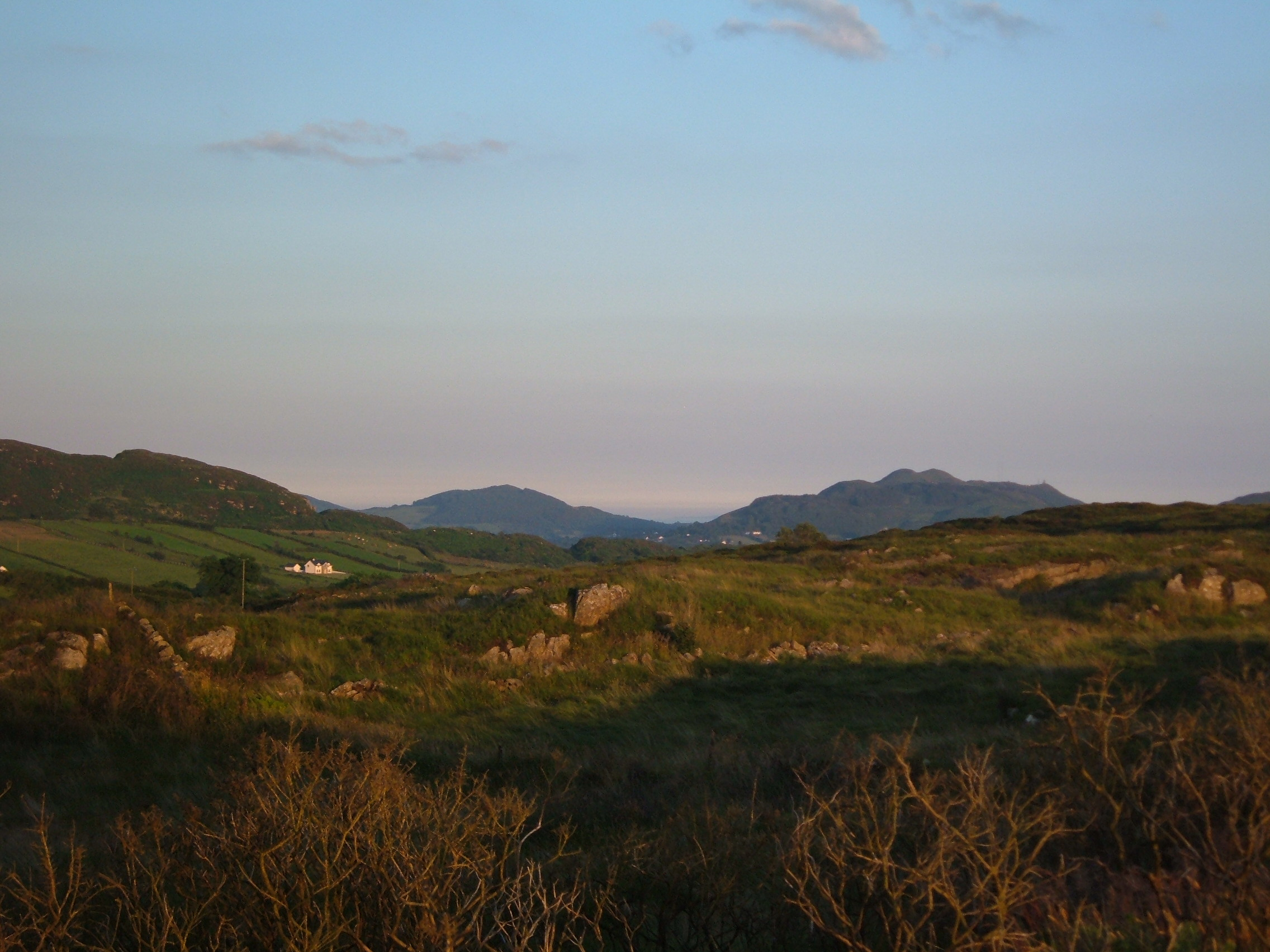
View of Forkhill and the Doorbrin mountains at dusk, from Aughanduff

- Aghadampe - Esch. Co. Map, 5.26, 1609 (Escheated map of County Armagh: Orior);
- Aghadamph - CPR Jas I, 187a, 1611 (Irish patent rolls of King James VI and I);
- Aghaduffe the backside of - Civ. Surv., x $77, 1655c (the Civil or "Down" Survey);
- Aghadiffe - Inq. Arm. (Paterson), 228, 1657(Inquisition as to parishes in County Armagh in 1657);
- Aghaduff - Inq. Arm. (Paterson), 225, 1657;
- Aghadu - Hib. Reg., Oryer, 1657c (Hibernia Regnum or the Down Survey of the Baronies of Ireland, 1655-58, Map of The Barony of Oryer in the County of Ardmagh (2 sheets));
- Aghaduffe - BSD, 3, 1661 (the Books of Survey and Distribution);
- Aghaduffe - HMR Murray (1941), 131, 1664 (the Hearth Money Rolls 1664);
- Agheduffe - HMR Orior, 426, 1664 (the Hearth Money Rolls of Orior, 1664);
- Aghneduffe or Aughinduffe - ASE, 107 b 7, 1666 (the Acts of Settlement and Explanation); and
- Aghaduffe - Hib. Del., 28, 1672c (Sir William Petty's Hiberniae Delineatio or Petty's Atlas. Based on the Down Survey).

== Location and geography ==
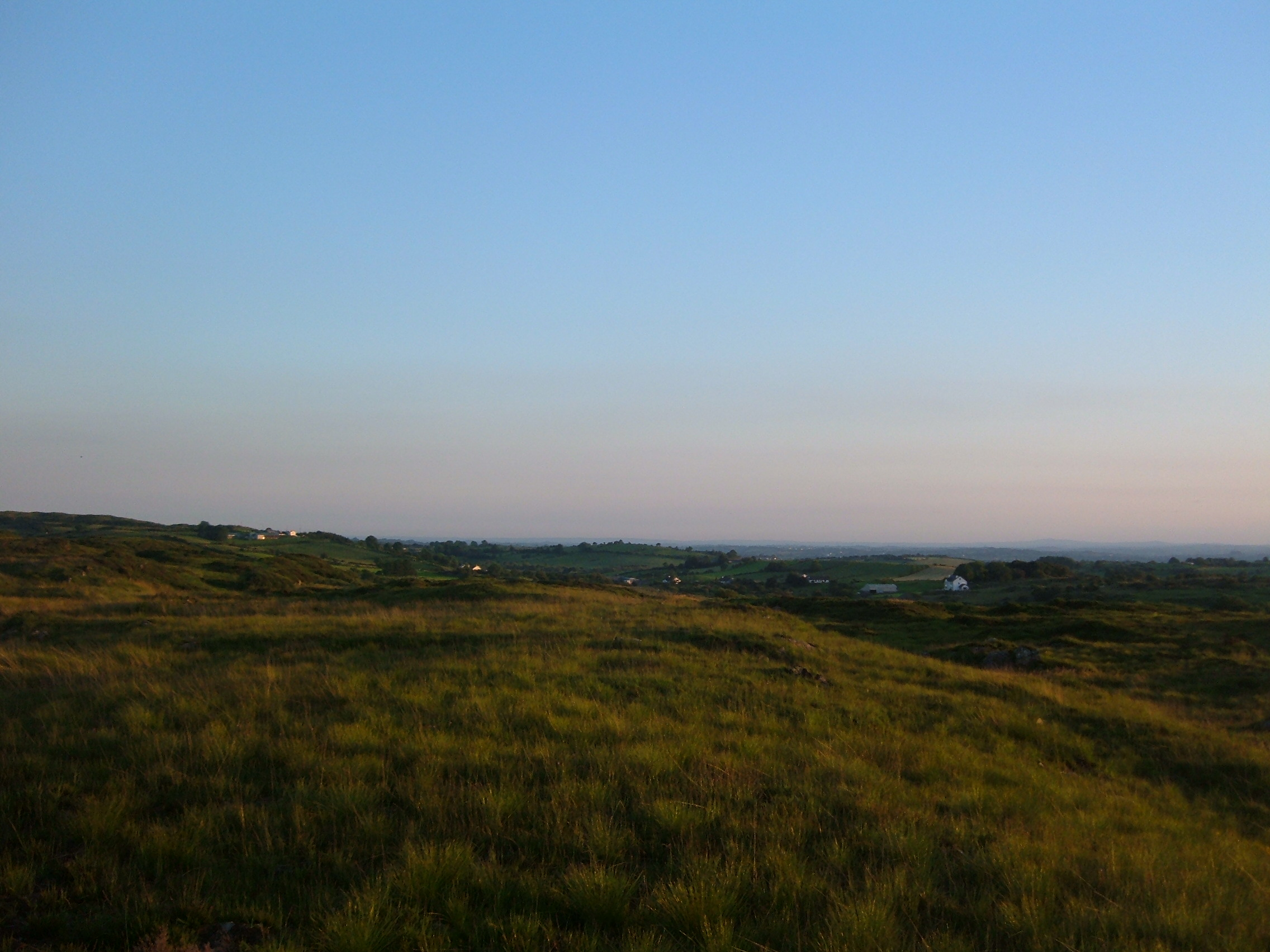
View over Aughanduff with County Monaghan in the distance

Aughanduff townland sits within the Ring of Gullion geological formation in rural County Armagh, and has been included within the Ring of Gullion Area of Outstanding Natural Beauty on its designation in 1991. It is in large part co-existent with the extent of lower and upper Aughanduff mountains, which form part of the 'outer ring' of the Ring of Gullion system, although its territory extends both east into the valley between the upper and lower mountains and Slievenacappel, and south of the Upper mountain to Cashel Lough Lower.

The small hamlet lies adjacent to Our Lady, Queen of Peace Church on the Silverbridge (Newry-Crossmaglen) Road in the southern portion of the townland. Aughanduff lies 2 miles (3.2 km) north of the village of Mullaghbawn, 3 miles (4.8 km) south of Belleeks and 3 1/2 miles (5.6 km) from Silverbridge. Neighbouring townlands are Carricknagavina to the north-east, Tullymacrieve to the east, Cashel to the south-east, Umericam (Ball North) to the south-west, Ummerinvore to the west, and Tullyogallaghan to the north-west.

The geological record of Aughanduff is complex, with bedrock in the area dating at least 500 million years, but with the modern landscape a result of complex interaction between a number of periods of volcanic activity and glacial movements.

Aughanduff Upper and Lower mountains form a core part of the western outer ring of the Ring of Gullion, a survivor the sedimentary rock formations which comprised the local landscape prior to the creation of the ring dyke which was to form both Slieve Gullion and the inner Ring of Gullion. Aughanduff, and the formations to its west, are thus much older than the neighbouring inner Ring of Gullion meaning that, hornfelsed by the creation and collapse of the neighbouring ring dyke, Aughanduff (as with Lislea, Flagstaff, etc., in the outer ring) form a hybrid-transition zone tectonically deformed by the Ring of Gullion's creation and destruction processes but part of the Longford-Down Massif which stretches from modern County Longford to Ards in County Down. The greater Longford-Down Massif is itself a small fragment of the Central Pangean Mountains which once spanned the super-continent Pangea and survive today in the Bohemian Massif in Central Europe, the Atlas and all the way to the Appalachians running from Newfoundland to Georgia, to form the eastern spine of North America.

Aughanduff's Greywacke core was formed by compacting and subduction of sediments at the bottom of the Iapetus Ocean; transforming muddy sediments into the hard, mineral rich, layered rock which now predominates. It is, therefore, geologically much more closely associated with Carrigatuke (mid-Armagh) and Mullyash (Castleblayney) than immediately neighbouring Slievenacappel or Slieve Gullion. Although outwardly similar to the neighbouring ‘’inner’’ Ring of Gullion, with its sedimentary core shaped by glacial erosion and deposition; vegetation, peat, and till cover; and human activity with pastoral farming leaving it visually similar to neighbouring mountains and hills it is very much geologically distinct, and an outcrop of the pre-existing landscape which predominated prior to the onset of volcanism as Pangea broke apart.

== Politics ==
Aughanduff is part of both the Newry and Armagh UK Parliament and Northern Ireland Assembly Countituencies. At Westminster level it is represented by Conor Murphy (Sinn Féin), and in the Northern Ireland Assembly by C. Boylan, D. Bradley, M. Brady, W. Irwin, Danny Kennedy and C. Murphy. The Townland also forms part of the Slieve Gullion ward of Newry and Mourne District Council where it is represented by Cllrs G. Donnelly, A. Flynn, P.J. Mc Donald, T. Hearty, and C. Burns.

== Features ==
The most obvious feature of the area is Upper and Lower Aughanduff mountains (rising to 234 and 227 meters respectively), although they are perhaps more correctly classed as two prominences of the same rock outcrop. As a result, the townland boasts scenic views of multi-peaked Slievenacappel ("mountain of the horse"), Slieve Gullion, Mullaghbawn, and Dromintee, as well as counties Louth and Monaghan to the south and west.

Cashel Lough Lower, which forms part of the southern boundary of the townland

Forming part of the boundary of the townland, one of the most attractive local features is Lower Cashel Lough, which is described as boasting "an extensive fringe of reed swamp and scrub woodland with alder and willow" and the area surrounding the lake has been designated an Area of Special Scientific Interest owing to its importance as a wetland habitat. The lake is used for trout fishing, for which a permit is required, and stocked twice annually.

A brook known locally as the 'roaring stream' forms part of the boundary of both Aughanduff and Parish of Forkhill with its neighbors to the west and marks the border between the ancient territories of Orior and Fews. In addition, historically an important local feature was the 'lone bush' which stood on top the mountain.

In terms of manmade features, at least one pre-historic site is known to have existed in the townland, with what is considered as having been an ancient fortified enclosure listed on the Northern Ireland Environment Agency's Monuments and Buildings Record.

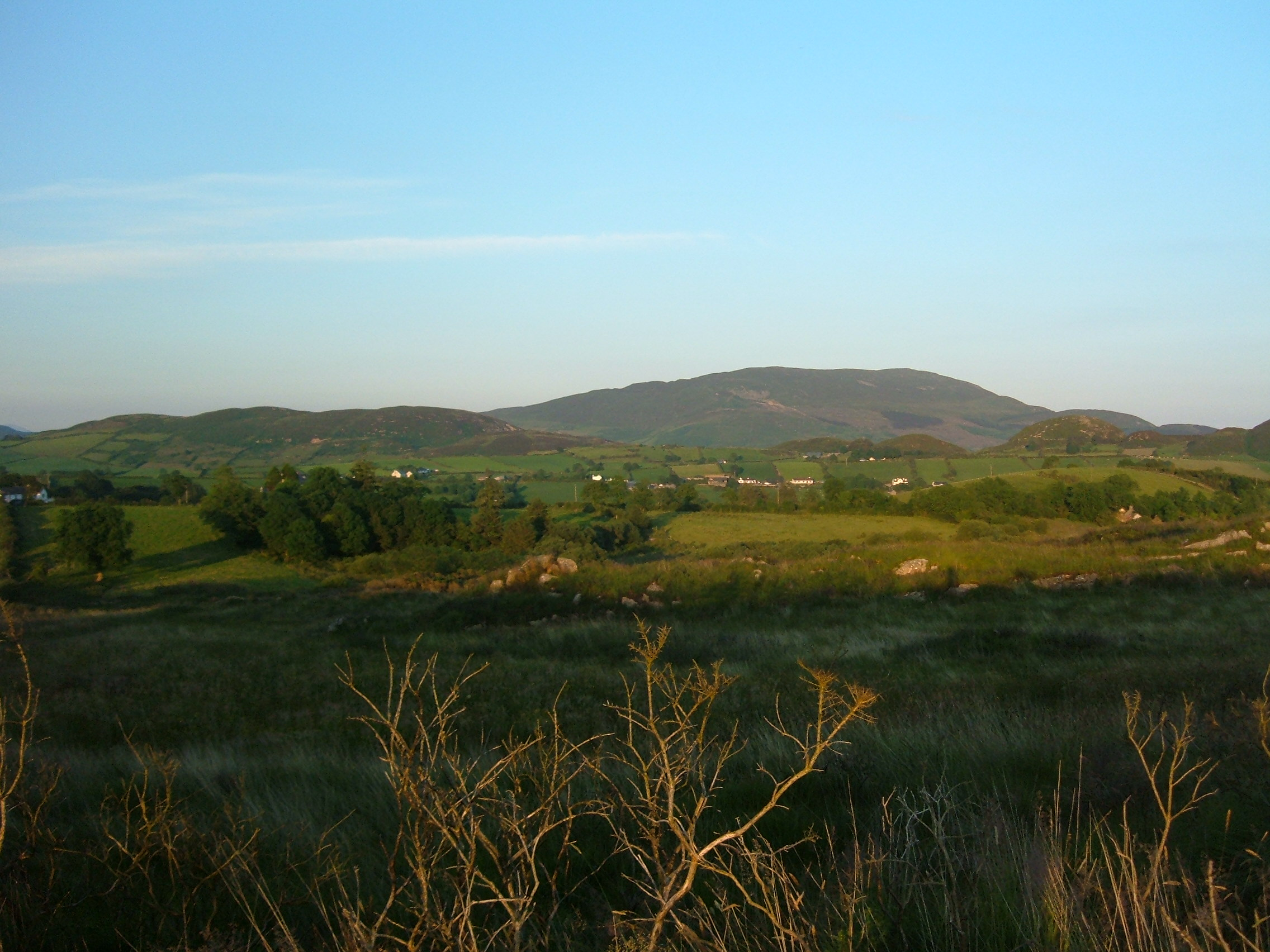
Facing east from Aughanduff Mountain at dusk

Today most recognisable man-made feature in the area is Our Lady Queen of Peace Church on the Silverbridge Road (Newry-Crossmaglen), opened on 16 June 1957, and built with donations coming from families in the locality and beyond, most notably from the United States, and New York City and Philadelphia in particular. The church is in the New Romanesque style and boasts a 50 ft bell tower. It was designed by Simon Aloysius Leonard of the Dublin firm W. H. Byrne & Son.

Otherwise, most of the prehistoric remains in the area appear to have been lost and the only other man-made features of note include the former school-house, and a small holy well near the church. The townland is traversed by the Aughanduff and Glenmore roads while the Polkone, Cashel, and main Newry to Crossmaglen roads run through the south eastern portion of the townland.

== Economic activity ==
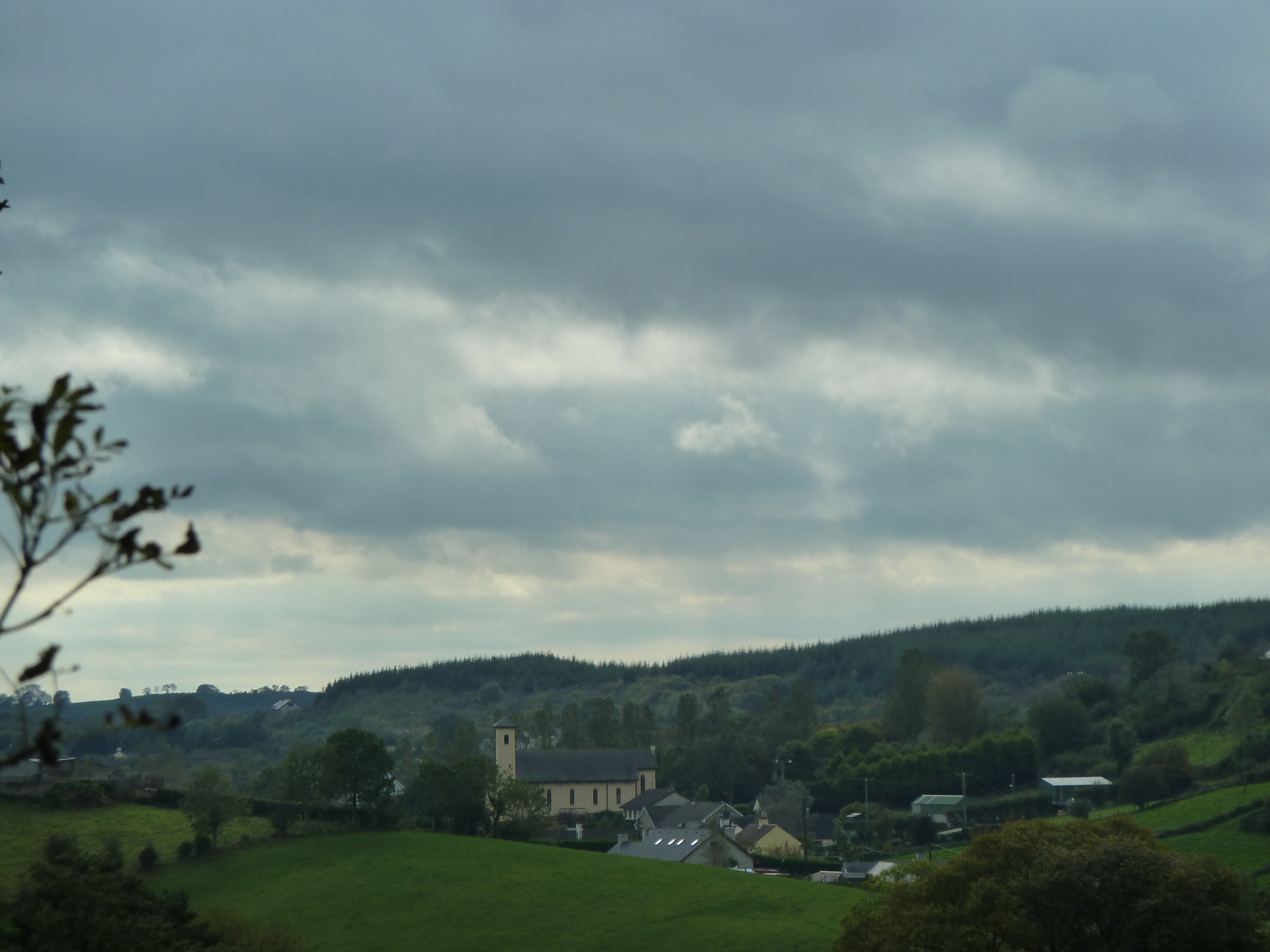
Hamlet of Aughanduff, in the distance

A map from 1827 shows two lime kilns in the area, however these seem to have fallen out of use by the turn of the 20th century and despite the rocky nature of the townland no commercial quarrying activities take place today. Many people in Aughanduff work in services in nearby towns such as Newry or Dundalk and return to the area in the evening, although some commute as far as Belfast (45 miles) and Dublin (62 miles). While the primary economic activity carried out within the townland remains farming (and specifically grazing), revenue is largely generated in services carried out outside the townland such as building, government and retail with most farmers engaging on the activity on a part-time basis. In 2007 Aughanduff saw its first electricity generating wind turbine erected, and the area also has access to broadband internet via satellite.

== Climate ==
Aughanduff, lying a mere ten miles (16 km) from the sea enjoys a typical Oceanic climate generated by the Gulf Stream with damp mild winters, temperatures rarely dropping below freezing during daylight hours and though frost is not infrequent in the months November - February, snow rarely lies for longer than a few hours. Summers are also mild and somewhat damp with sunshine often interspersed with showers during summer months.

Climate data for Aughanduff, County Armagh
| Month | Jan | Feb | Mar | Apr | May | Jun | Jul | Aug | Sep | Oct | Nov | Dec | Year |
|---|---|---|---|---|---|---|---|---|---|---|---|---|---|
| Mean daily maximum °F (°C) | 45 (7) | 45 (7) | 48 (9) | 54 (12) | 59 (15) | 63 (17) | 64 (18) | 64 (18) | 61 (16) | 55 (13) | 48 (9) | 45 (7) | 54 (12) |
| Mean daily minimum °F (°C) | 36 (2) | 36 (2) | 37 (3) | 39 (4) | 43 (6) | 48 (9) | 50 (10) | 50 (10) | 46 (8) | 45 (7) | 37 (3) | 36 (2) | 41 (5) |
| Average precipitation inches (mm) | 3.1 (80) | 2.0 (52) | 2.0 (50) | 1.9 (48) | 2.0 (52) | 2.7 (68) | 3.7 (94) | 3.0 (77) | 3.1 (80) | 3.3 (83) | 2.8 (72) | 3.5 (90) | 33.3 (846) |
Source: Met Éireann / BBC

== People ==
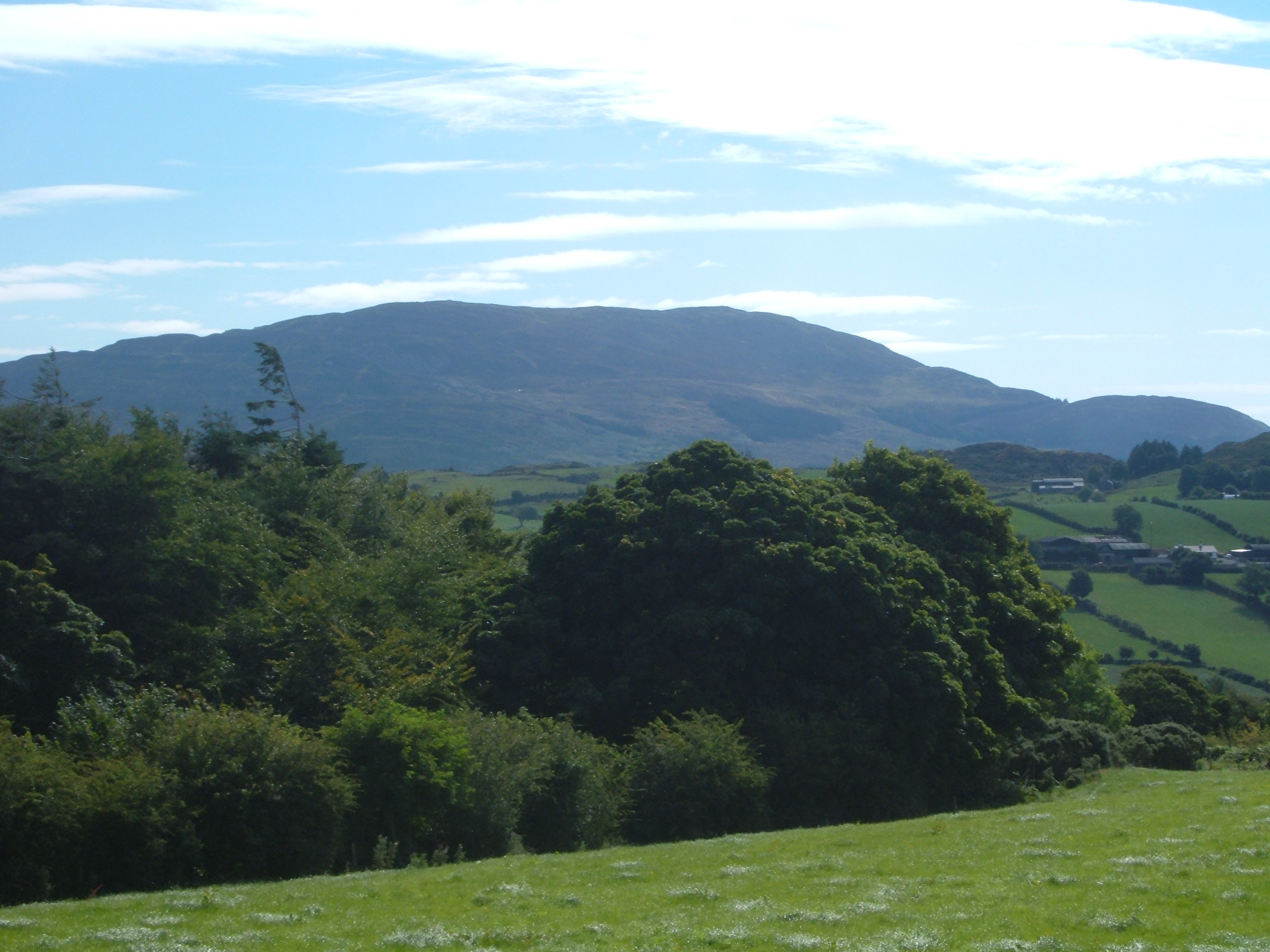
Slieve Gullion from Aughanduff

The population of the townland is currently in excess of two hundred persons, with those of indigenous descent comprising almost all inhabitants bar a few residents of English and American extraction. In terms of religion most inhabitants are Roman Catholic or non-religious with Our Lady Queen of Peace being the sole house of worship in the area.

As indicated by the adjacent table, the population of the townland has fallen significantly since the Irish Famine, with decline continuing from the 1840s until the 1980s. Recent years have seen a halt brought to this trend with something of a mild resurgence in terms of numbers resident in the townland.

English is by and large the sole language of communication used in the area today with Irish being spoken as a native tongue among a minority as late as the early 20th century - the last native Irish speaker in the townland, Molly Kavanagh, died in 1940. While the last monoglot Irish speakers appear to have died out in the mid-19th century, neighbouring Carricknagavina saw its last native Irish speaker, Annie Quinn, die at age 105 in 1997.

=== Demographics ===
Historical populations
| Census year | Households | Population |
|---|---|---|
| 1821 | 73 | 379 |
| 1841 | 78 | 425 |
| 1851 | 71 | 346 |
| 1861 | 78 | 324 |
| 1871 | 64 | 295 |
| 1891 | 62 | 244 |
| 1901 | 57 | 214 |
| 1911 | 57 | 201 |
| 1926 | 43 | 177 |
| 1937 | 39 | 149 |
| 1951 | 31 | 109 |

On Census night, 27 March 2011, it was revealed that of the population of the Aughanduff-Carricknagavina-Cashel-Tullymacreeve output area;

- 27.0% were under 16 years old and 10.5% were aged 60 and above;
- 50.75% of the population were male and 49.25% were female;
- 94.96% were from a Catholic Community Background;
- 3.64% were from a Protestant or Other Christian Community Background;
- The Average age of residents as 33;
- Population density was approximately 0.39 persons per hectare;
- 27.21% had degree level or higher qualifications;
- 64.29% were economically active, 41.0% were economically inactive;
- 5.7% were unemployed;
- 16.7% of people had a limiting long-term illness, health problem or disability;
- 11.6% of the population provided unpaid care to family, friends, neighbours or others;
- 84% of people stated that their general health was good;
- 86.79% of dwellings were owner occupied and 10.3% were rented;
- 44.54% of dwellings were owned outright;
- 8.48 of households were lone pensioner households;
- 8.97% of households were lone parent households with dependent children; and
- The average household size was 3.14.

More recent statistical surveys of the area have revealed that among the townland's inhabitants:

- 10.7% of persons aged 18–59 were claiming Income Support;
- 11.4% of persons aged 16–59/64 were claiming Incapacity Benefit; and
- 2.8% of persons aged 16+ were claiming Housing Benefit.

== History ==
=== Early history ===
Aughanduff was probably first settled in the Bronze Age. No prehistoric remains of note appear to survive in the area, however, bar an undated site listed on the Northern Ireland Environment Agency's Monuments and Buildings Record. This is thought to have been an enclosure 60m in diameter, set on a localised height within the townland at Irish Grid Reference H9736023370. Photographic records show a series of earthworks and although a field inspection in 2004 failed to locate upstanding remains, it is noted that the site would have been an excellent position for a settlement. The townland lies just over a mile (2 km) from An Aughnaclough mullion, where in 1815 the first, and reportedly most remarkable, megalith tomb in Ireland (subsequently destroyed) was discovered by Mr. John Bell of Newry. Several prehistoric stone structures have been found and documented in the area but many have been lost over the years. An example of such a structure was a ring fort named 'the Lis' which appears on the map of 1827 as being in the field adjacent to where the Church now stands, however this structure is no longer visible and must be presumed to have been destroyed.

=== The Middle Ages & Early Modern Period ===
Formed into the See of Armagh in the Early Christian period, Aughanduff and indeed the South Armagh region in which it lies acted as a buffer zone between the Gaelic Irish and expanding English pale throughout the Middle Ages into the early modern period with Roche and Moyry Castles lying in its immediate hinterland.

Despite its proximity to English settlement, the area remained under native control until the 17th century as part of the historic territory of Orior (from Irish 'Airthir' meaning 'Easterns') and was controlled by the O'Hanlon Sept chiefs from their stronghold at Loughgilly (the "lough of whiteness"). That Territory neighbored the Fews (from Irish 'An Fiodh' or 'the wood'), to the west, the Pale to the South, and the territories of the O'Neills of Tyrone to the North; and Aughanduff mountains formed part of the western boundary with the Fews.

==== The Tudor Reconquest and Plantation ====
The 16th century saw the Tudor Dublin Castle administration seek to expand the area under its direct control beyond the borders of the medieval Pale and reduce the power and influence of the native Gaelic Lords, in an effort which later became known as the Tudor conquest of Ireland. This strategy was to put the Crown in conflict with native chiefs as the former attempted to increase its influence at the expense of the latter, which lead to Shane O'Neill's rebellion in Ulster in the 1560s. Following the defeat of this effort, in 1569 the Dublin Parliament passed a statute confiscating the territories of a range of defeated Ulster chiefs and declared them forfeit to the Crown.

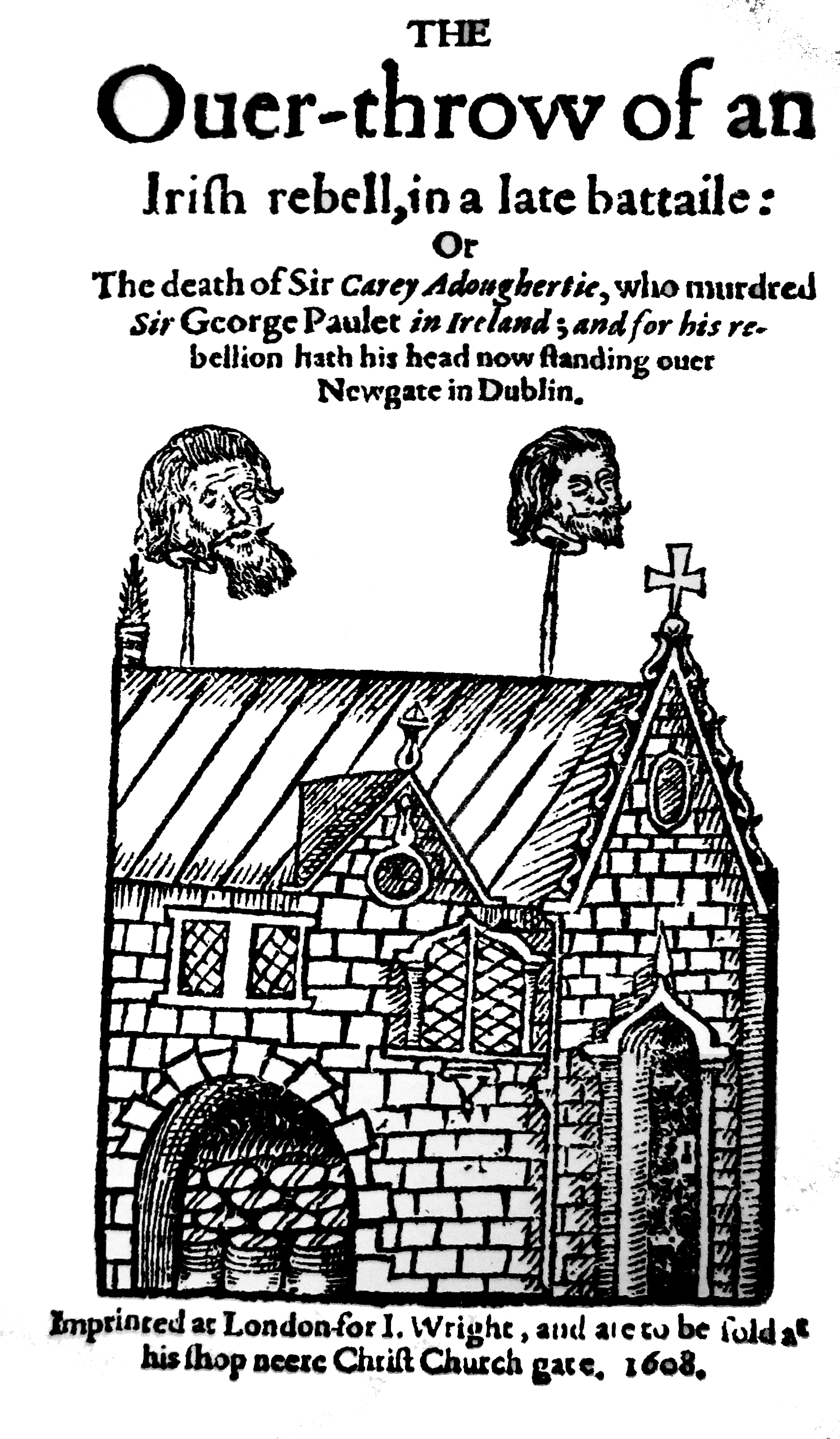
The 1608 Rebellion was to have long-lasting consequences in the area

Included amongst these were "the countrey of Orry, called O’Hanlons country". Following this Act, the Dublin Castle administration pursued its first attempt at planting colonists in Ulster and on 5 October 1572, Queen Elizabeth I granted Captain Thomas Chatterton control of the territory of "Orior, the Fews and the Gllowglasses country", on condition that settlement be completed with various conditions attached by March 1579. Chatteron is said to have travelled from to Dundalk to take possession of his grant but failed to settle it and forfeit his grant to the crown, killed at the hands of the local O’Hanlon Chiefs soon after his grant was revoked in 1576. With no effective Dublin overlordship, Orior remained under the control of the O'Hanlons in 1594 at the beginning of the Nine Years' War.

Although it caused much destruction and upheaval in the area, and they changed sides during the war's course, the O’Hanlons retained control of Orior through the Nine Years' War and in the immediate aftermath of O'Neill's conditional capitulation and the signing of the articles of peace at Mellifont, Orior remained O’Hanlon territory. Increased control from Dublin Castle was a direct result of the war, however, and 1607 saw the flight of the earls and removal of the pinnacle of the native Gaelic power structure in the North. Ulster, in the immediate aftermath, was a tinderbox, with both the Dublin administration and native magnates wary and unsure of the strength andintentions of each other. Into this uneasy situation came the Lord of Innisowen's (Sir Cahir O’Doherty) rebellion of 1608, and although this began as a result of a local dispute with the Crown Governor of Derry it would prove to have wide-scale repercussions for Ulster. O’Doherty was brother-in-law of Oghy Óg O’Hanlon, son of Sir Eochaidh "Oghy" O’Hanlon, then chief of Orior, and the latter lead his followers in Orior to join the revolt. The Dublin Castle administration quickly succeeded in quelling the rebellion, and Orior was subject to much violence in "mopping up" operations. Although the Dublin Castle administration had been considering some form of plantation following the Nine Years' War, O’Doherty's rebellion seems to have convinced the Crown authorities, and indeed King James I himself, of the need for a much more large-scale plantation than had been envisaged previously so as to quell native power in Ulster for good.

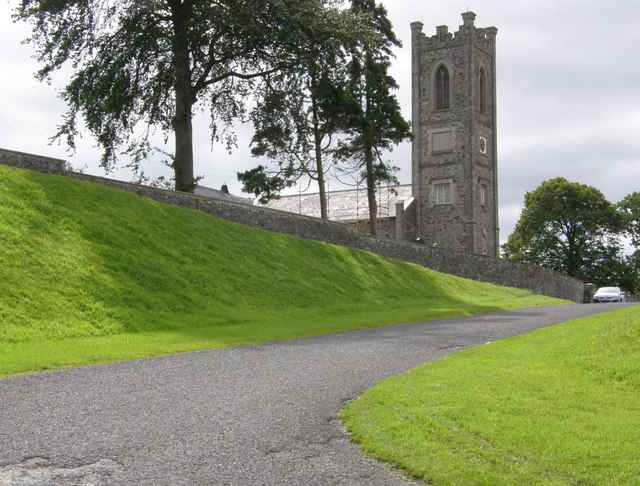
Loughgilly, from which the O'Hanlons ruled Aughanduff and the lands of Orior

It was against this backdrop that the plantation of Ulster was planned and carried out, and Aughanduff first enters the historical record in its own right. In October 1608, the first arrangements were made for Orior's plantation with Sir Oghy O’Hanlon selling his interests to Orior to the Crown in return for an annuity of £80 for life, and payment of his debts of £300. The Lord Deputy, Sir Arthur Chichester wrote that he had made "a good bargin for the king and a fair way for the plantation". In 1608, 1609, and then 1610, three "Commissions of Plantation" sat throughout the county and investigated the extent of existing land holdings and divisions in the area. From these, the commission's cartographer, Sir Josias Bodley drew the Barony Maps of County Armagh (which formed part of the Maps of the Escheated Counties in Ireland, 1609), and it is on this map that Aughanduff is first recorded as a distinct district then existing in the county, although with the anachronistic name "Aghadamph." As with the rest of Orior, Aughanduff was considered for allocation in the plantation but rather than being planted with English or Scotch servitors, Aughanduff (as well as nearby Maphoner) was awarded to Owen McHugh Mor O'Neill, a native of the County who was to be displaced from his family's ancestral territory of Toaghie, just outside modern day Tynan in mid-Armagh. Owen McHugh Mor O'Neill is well documented in the records of the time and was a great-grandson of Art O'Neill (d.1515) – chief of all the O'Neills of Ulster – and his own father and grandfather had been chiefs of the Fews, and the O'Neill Sept that ruled it. Owen McHugh Mor is best remembered for his bitter rivalry with his second-cousin and then chief of the Fews, Sir Turlough MacHenry O'Neill(of Glassdrummond Castle), a half brother of the Great O'Neill.

Aughanduff was awarded to a member of the O'Neill clan in the Plantation of Ulster

Both men inherited their fathers’ rival claims to chiefdom of the Fews and continued their local O'Neill Sept's practice of duplicitous dealings when it came to supporting their cousins to the North and the Dublin Government, whose territories they bordered directly to the south. Often, perhaps in light of their position on the borders of the Pale, the O'Neill's of the Fews acted in support of the Dublin Castle administration against their kinsmen to the North, and both Owen McHugh Mor and Turlough McHenry rivalled in seeking the support of the Crown to bolster their own power and claims. In 1600, for example, Owen McHugh Mor wrote to the then Viceroy, Lord Mountjoy, outlining why he, and not Turlough McHenry, should be used by the crown to overthrow Hugh O'Neill – invoking his family's service to the crown and stating that:

They do also object that Sir Arthur O'Neill is the best member for Her Majesty's service and the chiefest man to be advanced ... I was the cause and worker of him into Her Majesty's service. So did my father work and his father unto Sir Henry Sidney against Shane O'Neill, and my grandfather to service King Henry the Eight against the rebellion of Con Bacco and Shane O'Neill

By 1610, however, Owen McHugh had effectively been sidelined by his cousin as master of the Fews and leader of the O'Neill of the Fews. For the son of a former chief of the Fews and holder of his families domains at Toaghie, the townlands of Aughanduff and Maphoner were something of a poor consolation but his grant reflected his status at the time. Indeed, Chichester wrote in 1608 as the plantation was being contemplated that "In the settlement of this country and that of Tyrone wishes that some may be taken of Owyne More O’Neale, more for his honest simplicity than for any harm he is likely to do" The grant to Owen McHugh Mor O'Neill (whose name is also recorded as "Owen McHugh mc Neale Moore" and various other derivatives of Eoghan mac Aodh More O'Neill) read as follows:

Grant to Owen McHugh O’Neale, gent. The lands of Aghadamph, one bailliboe; and Moyfoner, on bailliboe; in all, 240 acres. Rent 2l. 11s od.

==== 1641 and after ====
Following Owen McHugh Mor's death in 1634, his son, Hugh (or Aodh) Óg O'Neill inherited his father's estate and is recorded as having been "of Aughanduff". As with many of the O'Neills of the Fews, who were seen as having sided against the local chiefs during the Nine Years' War, Hugh Óg took the rebel side during the 1641 Rebellion and is recorded as an outlaw in the Lords Justices’ proclamation of February 1642 with a £300-£400 price on his head.

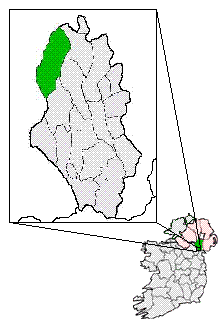
Aughanduff within the Parish of Forkhill

As a result of the tumultuous events of the Confederate Wars, the Cromwellian conquest, the Restoration Settlement, and the Williamite War, the territory passed out of native ownership, and beyond land grants and deeds documenting transfers in ownership of the townland, the history of the area at this time is not well documented. The Hearth Money Roll for Orior in 1664, however, list three residents as paying the tax (with one hearth each) in that year: Art McDoneell; Torlagh O’Hanratty, and Hugh O’Mullyry. The townland's name is recorded as "Agheduffe" at the time.

During the late 1600s and early 1700s, the area acted as something of a haven for Catholic clergy as the Penal Laws began to take effect and saw violence as Crown Authorities tried stamp their recently acquired authority, particularly in the relatively lawless territory of the Fews. John Johnston, Constable of the Fews from 1710 onwards, had his headquarters at Roxborough, just beyond the border of the Aughanduff, and within easy view of it. Just beyond the boundary of the townland, in Umerican bog, lies Pulkowen or Pikegowen, a well-known rock outcrop that sits behind old Aughanduff School on Pike's Brae. The stone is believed to have been used as a "heading stone" by the Johnston's and their agents in the 1700s and is considered by some to be haunted. Collecting records of the county in the 1930s, local historian T.G.F. Patterson recorded the following with respect to that stone:

"In the old days when the Johnstons were at Roxborough, this was one of their beheading-stones. And the bloodstains are upon it till this very day, and it's few people would pass it at night because of the ghosts that still be there. Five pounds a head they had for all that went till Dublin. And the head of many a decent man went up instead of a Tory, and Keenan was worse than the Johnstons.

A number of Deeds in the Dublin Registry of Deeds (established in 1707) record the townland being passed between various Ascendancy figures. The earliest of these remaining is that between Abraham and Florina Ball of Darver Castle, County Louth and John Vaughan of Dublin of 11 May 1716. A number of these deeds survive and detail changes in interests in the district between then and its being purchased by its last landlords, the MacGeoughs, in 1803.

In 1771, the area's last symbolic ties with O’Hanlon overlordship were severed when Aughanduff, in addition to eleven other townlands, were split from the Parish of Loughgilly (erstwhile location of Castle O’Hanlon) and united into the newly formed parish of Forkhill.

=== 19th century ===
During the 19th century, two important national developments had a direct and lasting impact on the district: the famine (and accompanying emigration), followed by the Land War. Beyond that, despite being a small area and both rural and heavily dependent on small-scale agriculture, the 19th century saw a series of important developments in the district and the history of this period is far from mundane.

First, real social reform came when in the 1820s a national (elementary) school was constructed in the townland for a cost of £112 and funded by the state (through the Kildare Place Society) and by the local Landlord. In 1824 this school records having one Episcopal and some forty-five Roman Catholic schoolchildren enrolled.

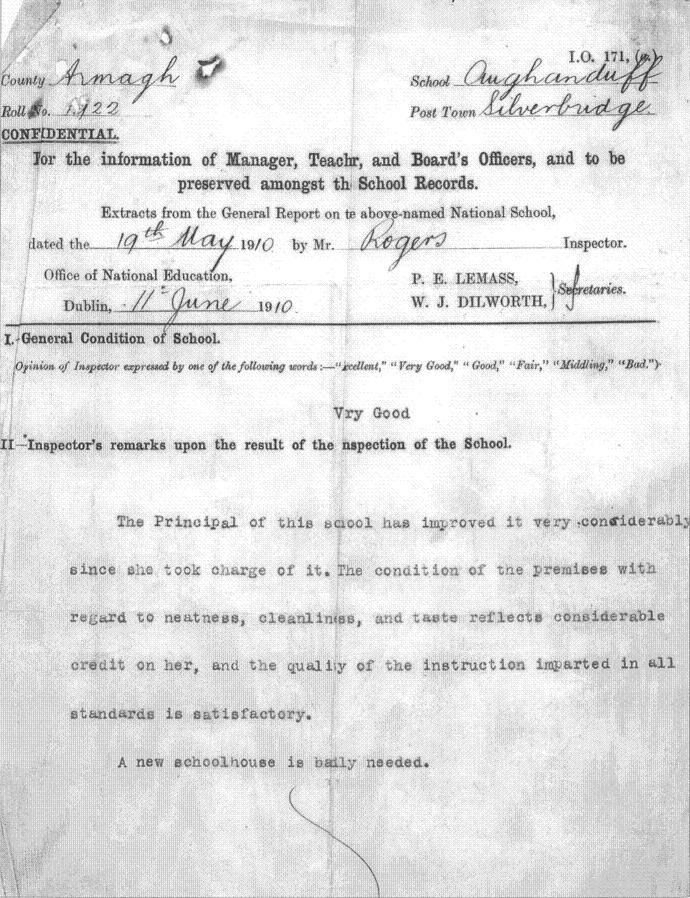
Inspectors Report on Aughanduff School, 1910.

Second, the area was directly involved in the Tithe War of the early 1830s and saw at least one major outbreak of violence. Influenced by the emergence of a potent national campaign against paying taxes to support the established church (to which many of the residents owed no allegiance) and the presence of ribbonism in the area, in August 1832, a number of farmers in the area openly refused to pay the tithe. When police from Forkhill arrived to collect the tax, a number of the men gathered and their leader, a thirty-five-year-old farmer, Mr. Peter Pyar openly challenged the police to attempt to enforce the decree against him. Outnumbered, the police withdrew and on 23 September 1832, police from Newry, Forkhill and Newtownhamilton are reported to have descended to the area to arrest Mr. Pyar, who is stated to have lived near the (then newly erected) schoolhouse, and to have had "felenously fired upon a party of police in the same neighbourhood, while on duty, relative to tithe seizure" on the fourth of the month. When they arrived at his residence, police were unable to find Mr. Pyar, and on visiting several other dwellings in the area, noticed that the menfolk were all strangely absent. The Newry Telegraph then reports the events which followed:

Giving up their object as entirely hopeless, the police soon after separated for their respective stations. As, however, Serjeant King and the Forkhill party were returning, by one of the passes through the mountains of Aughenduff and Tullymacerieve, they were startled by tremendous shouts, yells, sounding of horns, &c, and observed, running towards a certain point, evidently with the view of intercepting the party, a number of men, amounting to 200, at least, armed with guns and other weapons.

The newspaper reports a short, non-fatal gun battle occurred thereafter, and the police returned to their barracks, but concludes that the events "will serve to demonstrate the state of mischievous excitement and reckless turbulence to which a part of this neighbourhood, hitherto considered peaceable, has at length been brought by designing demagogues and itinerating agitators".

Third, a number of disputes between neighbours over land and morals have been recorded and appear to have been reported widely. A story in the Nation in 1875, for example, records the following incident occurring in January of that year:

A Lurgan correspondent states that three men, whose names are unknown, entered the house of a woman named Mary Gollogly of Aughanduff, a few nights ago and after assaulting her and her daughter, compelled the latter to kneel down, and to repeat an oath after them to the effect that she would discontinue "Keeping company with a certain young man". The parties then decamped.

Another dispute which brought the area's inhabitants to national attention, was the case of Kirk v. McDonald [1892]: proceedings brought by a young widow (Ms. Mary Kirk) for breach of a promise to marry made by an older bachelor (Mr. Laurence McDonald). This case saw the testimony from a number of local witnesses called to give evidence, including the parties. Although the Defendant's counsel - Mr O'Shaughnessy Q.C. - informed the jury that "the action was wholly unsustainable, and he submitted that when the jury heard the facts they would give a verdict which should put an end to actions of this kind", the Irish Times reports that the jury found that the defendant did promise to marry the plaintiff, and awarded damages to her totaling one farthing.

Finally, 19th-century reports also record what must be one of the most tragic and bizarre episodes in the area's history when, in June 1863, the local schoolmaster was struck by lightning, and died, while teaching his class. The Freeman's Journal reports the following:

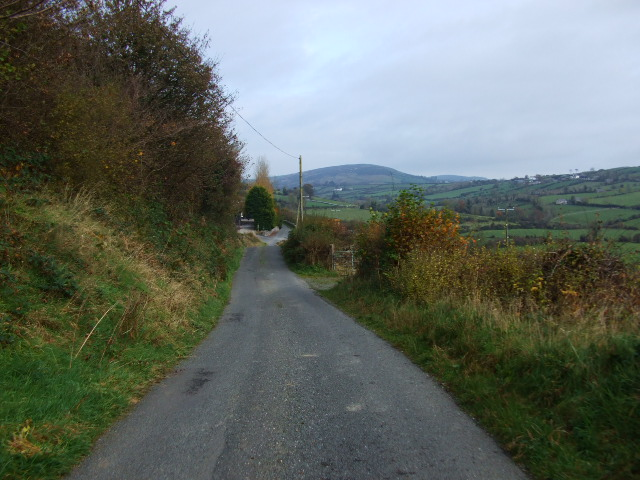
The Aughanduff Road in the 21st century, similar to as it would have appeared in the 1800s

Death From Lightning - Awfully Sudden Death.
We have to report an awfully sudden death from lightning one of those cases which turn up from time to time as if to warn us of the uncertainty of life. On Tuesday, at half-past eleven o'clock, as a National School teacher, John Mooney, stationed at Aughanduff, was engaged in instructing a class of children, he was suddenly knocked over by a flash of lightning, which illuminated the building for the moment in a manner almost dazzling to the on-lookers. A little boy stating near the teacher had his breast and clothes severely singed, and so terrified were the scholars at the awful sight they had witnessed, that some of them screamed aloud, and others rushed from the place. Assistance as speedily procured, and Mooney was removed; but he was killed on the spot.

==== Famine ====
Arguably the most important single event to occur during the 19th century, and the one with the most profound repercussions was the coming of the potato blight, and following famine. Immediately prior to the famine some 425 souls were recorded as inhabiting the townland in the 1841 census. On 6 September 1845 the first occurrence of blight was recorded in the county, and the district as well as surrounding areas were affected soon thereafter. By the 1851 census, the population was recorded as having declined to 346, and this reduced by almost half (on the 1841 figure) to 214 in 1901. The famine hit poor in the area hardest with stories circulating over a century later of the destitute starving with their mouths turned green, having resorted to eating grass. As well as bringing hunger and emigration, the famine brought about longstanding changes in the settlement patterns of the area, with the disappearance of stores and shibeens which had existed prior to the mid-1840s, but disappeared with population decline and the abandonment of marginal land for cultivation.

==== The Land War ====
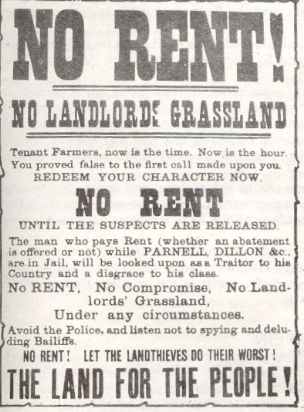
Irish Land League poster dating from the 1880s

The townland was amongst lands purchased by Joshua MacGeough (or 'MacGeough' as he styled himself)(1747–1817) of Drumsill House, County Armagh in 1803. The McGeoughs were minor gentry figures who held considerable interests in the county, with Joshua's grandfather, also Joshua McGeough (1683–1755), having built up the family's land interests and dying with assets valued at approximately £100,000 (in the mid-18th century). Upon (the younger) Joshua McGeough's death in 1817, his fourth child, Walter MacGeough (1790–1866), a barrister and previously High Sheriff of Armagh in 1819, inherited the families interests in the district. Griffith's Valuation, completed in June 1865 for the county, lists Walter, now McGeough Bond and of the family's new second seat the "Argory" at Moy, as Landlord for the whole of the townland on that date. Upon his death in 1866, in addition to surrounding districts in South Armagh ownership of the area passed to his fourth son, Robert John MacGeough, JP. Despite being a resident landlord (MacGeough lived at nearby Silverbridge House in Ummeracam (Ball) South, between Aughanduff and Silverbridge) and active in the management of his estate, R.J. MacGeough appears to have been an unpopular landlord and frequent litigant in disputes arising with respect to his ownership of the townland. In 1871, for example, he was involved in the case of McGeough v. Savage which involved a dispute over the sale of lumber in the townland, and in which evidence was adduced that 134 trees in Aughanduff, between one and two feet in circumference, had been felled since 1868. In McGeough v. Gollogly [1891], he was involved in unsuccessful litigation with a tenant in the townland over a decision of the land commissioners as to fair rent for the tenants leasehold. Further, a number of records exist which detail evictions which occurred on Mr. McGeough's estate in Aughanduff.

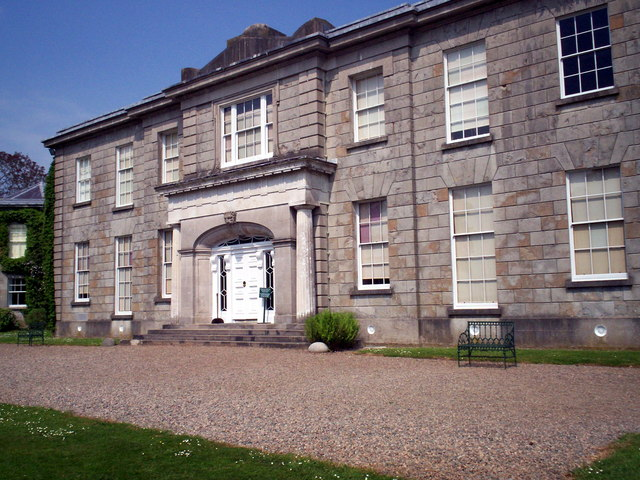
The Argory, principal residence of Walter MacGeough Bond, whose family owned the townland from 1803 onwards.

Matters escalated with the following the establishment of the Land League, which was active in the area, and whose campaign led to withholding of rent by a number of the tenants in the townland and surrounding districts. On 12 April 1882, a force of twenty police, accompanied by bailiffs and assistants of Mr. McGeough, arrived and began executing forty ejectment decrees for non-payment of rents in the townland and surrounding districts. The Belfast News-Letter reports their progress as follows:

it may be stated that the district over which the evictions were to take place is about the only part of the county in which the Land League succeeded in obtaining a footing. For some time past, it has been in a rather disturbed state and Mr. McGeough himself was obliged to get police protection […] The evictions commenced about elevent o’clock in the morning and were continued until fourteen of the tenants were put out, and re-admitted as caretakers, on signing an agreement to that effect. No opposition was offered to the Sheriff's officers, and but very few people were present, save the police and those immediately concerned.

Tensions appear to have reduced somewhat, however, following the famous Crossmaglen Conspiracy case, in which a number of men from across the southern parts of the county were listed in the ‘Crossmaglen Book’ and ‘Mullaghbawn Book’ as being members of the "Patriotic Brotherhood" (153 in the former and 65 in the latter), which aimed to overthrow landlordism in the area. Twelve amongst these were charged with attempted murder of Mr. McGeough, and another landlord - Henry Gustavus Brooke – all of whom were convicted in Belfast in 1883 and sentenced to various punishments. Although there was no immediate change in the ownership of the area, at national level the League's agitation let to the enactment of the Purchase of Land (Ireland) Act 1885, one of a series of Land Acts where was to have far reaching effects in the area in the early 20th century.

While at the end of the 19th century, the townland was in many ways similar to what it had been at its beginning - the McGeough family still held title to the land, and the great majority of the inhabitants worked as peasants thereon - in many ways it was transformed. The population was steep decline, now both educated (to at least an elementary level) and bilingual, and to some degree radicalised, all of which would serve (to some degree) in contributing to the portentous changes which would occur during the first half of the 20th century.

=== 20th century ===
The 20th century brought a number of wide-ranging changes to the townland and its people, the first of which followed soon after the death of Robert J. McGeough in 1903. His interests in the land were inherited by his daughter Alice Blacker-Douglass (née McGeough), then of Killiney, County Dublin, from whom it was purchased by its tenants individually under the Irish Land Acts during the course of the early years of the 1900s - significantly later than neighbouring Carricknagavina which was amongst the first townlands in the country bought out by its tenants. The Censuses of 1901 and 1911 both offer a valuable insight into the population of the area at that time and it is noteworthy that a large proportion of the population are recorded as speaking both Irish and English as late as 1911.

Badge of the Ulster Special Constabulary, involved in a number of incidents in the area in the early 1920s

Following soon after transfer to its tenants came the tumultuous events of the Irish War of Independence, which, in addition to its long-term consequences, made its mark felt on the area. First came the death of a resident on 6 June 1920 when a young man, Mr. Peter McCreesh was shot in the back while attempting to flee from an exchange of gunfire between police and rebels while attending an Aeridheacht gathering with his brother in nearby Cullyhanna. On 8 June, an inquest was opened into the death at his father's house in Aughanduff and the Newry Reporter stated that "all approaches to the residence were guarded by armed soldiers posted at various vantage points, while a large number of police, armed and otherwise, were on duty in connection with the inquest." The Coroner's Jury delivered its verdict at Meighfoner Schoolhouse, Mullaghbawn, in August 1920 which the newspaper reports was as follows:

The jury returned a verdict of death from shock following haemorrhage caused by a bullet fired from the revolver of Sergeant Holland. They tendered sympathy to the relatives and added: ‘We condemn the sending of police to such gatherings as Cullyhanna Aeridheacht, believing their presence there in the present state of affairs causes trouble’. The School-house during the inquiry was guarded by a strong force of military from Newry.

On 30 December the same year, violence came directly to the district when Mr. Peter Mackin, then a minor, was shot and severely wounded by Special Constabulary at his home in the area. Although it was claimed he attempted to escape, Mackin later successfully sued the authorities for malicious wounding and was awarded £250 in damages (with £10 and 10 shillings in witness expenses) at Ballybot Quarter Sessions on 30 September 1921.

The area saw a return to quiet normalcy in the period following the Partition of Ireland and although initially incorporated within the new Northern Ireland state, the area was a mere 5 miles (8.0 km) from the recently demarcated border with the Irish Free State. As part of its work on determining the boundaries between the two new States, the Boundary Commission considered the position of the inhabitants of the district and the surrounding area in light of political, economic, transport and other factors.

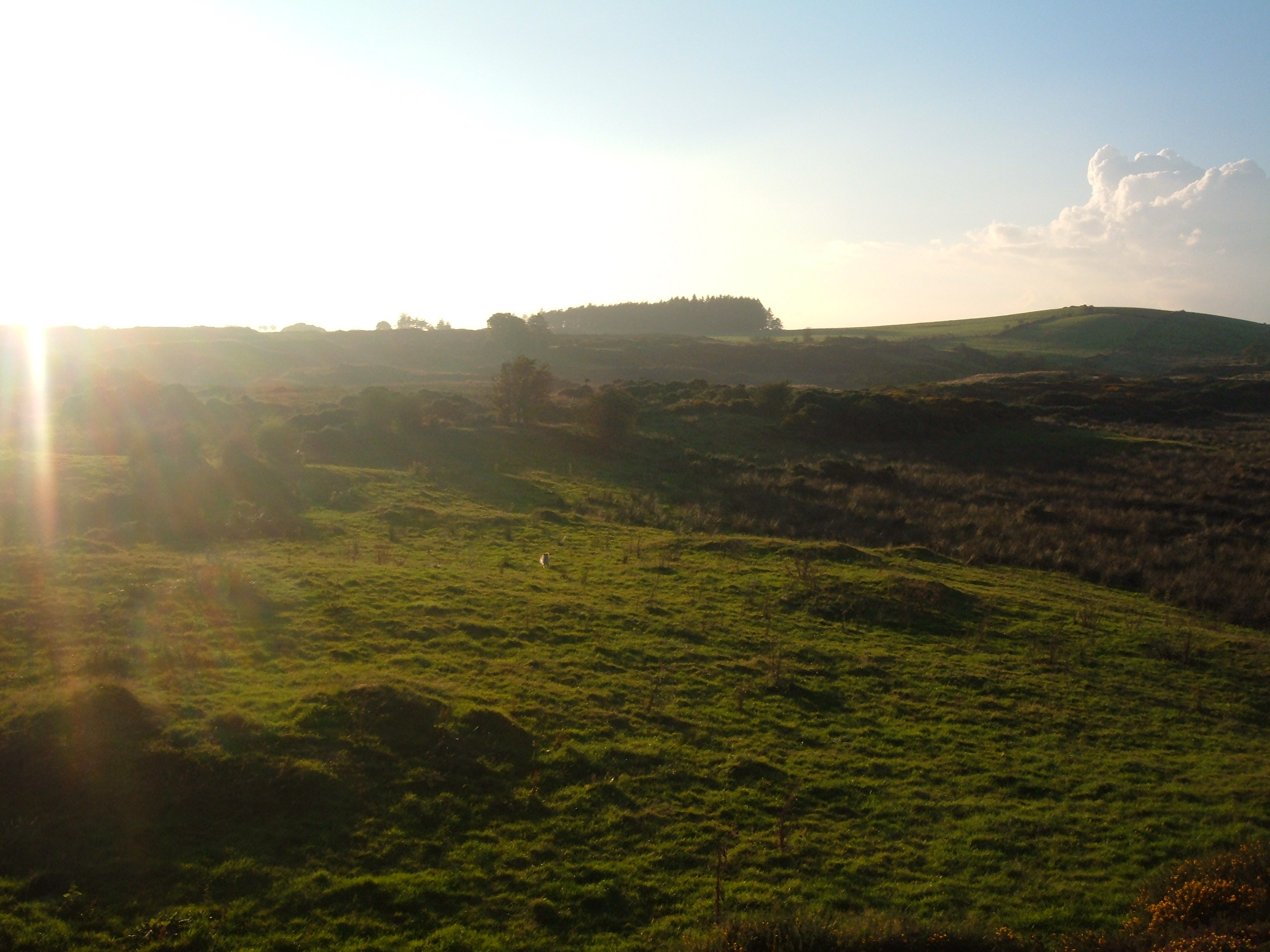
Boundary between Aughanduff and Tullyogallagh, which was to form part of the Irish border

Having done so, the Commission recommended that the townland be transferred to the jurisdiction of the Irish Free State and that part of the boundary of the townland form part of the border between the two states, i.e. it stated that the relevant part of the border should follow a line along:

a portion of the Tullyogallaghan-Aughanduff townland boundary, then the Carrowmannan-Aughanduff townland boundary, then a portion of the Carrowmannan–Carricknagavna townland boundary

The Boundary Commission's report was not implemented, and despite nationalism remaining an active force in the area (an Aughanduff Anti-Partition Club is being reported as active in the area as late as 1939) the political position of the area remained unchanged. The mid-20th century saw the arrival of electricity, mains water and telephones in the area as well as the closing of the local school in June 1972 as all schools in the parish were amalgamated into two, with one at Mullaghbawn and another at Forkhill. The later years of the 20th century also seem to indicate the end of the long process of population decline with population figures stabilising and finally beginning to grow from the end of the 1980s.

==== Aughanduff Church ====
May 1955 marked saw an important development in the local community, with the laying of the foundation stone of a new Catholic church, Our Lady Queen of Peace, which fronts unto the Newry-Crossmaglen Road. The new church was built due to a perceived need and the fact that locals had worshipped in the nearby school-house for the previous 30 years, and plans were drawn up soon after the appointment of Fr. J O'Neill as Parish Priest. The church was designed by Mr. Simon Leonard of the Dublin firm of Architects, Byrne and Son, and was planned to accommodate up to 400. At the ceremony prior to laying the foundation stone in nearby Mullaghbawn church, Cardinal D’Alton, then Primate of All Ireland outlined why he felt the construction of a church in the area was fitting, stating that:

It is interesting to note that in 1673, in a new era of active persecution an edict was issued by the English Parliament commanding all members of the regular clergy to depart from the Kingdom of Ireland. Blessed Oliver Plunket and his intimate friends, John Brennan, Bishop of Waterford refused to abandon their flocks and fled for refuge to Mullaghbawn, where they could depend upon the loyalty of the people. A well founded tradition still points to the hut where the prelates lived until the fury of the storm had abated. Mullaghbawn and the adjoining areas were also in popular opinion associated with the activities of Dr. Patrick Donnelly who had his humble residence, his little Penal-day chapel not far from the site of the new church. He was born in Cookstown and after serving various parts of the Archdoicese was appointed Bishop of Dromore. As in one of the darkest periods in our history he was for some years the only Bishop resident in the country. He ranged not only through Armagh but through a good portion of the Northern province in his efforts to minister the people. He was a romantic and resourceful figure who frequently went round disguised as an itinerant harper and became popularly known as the Bard of Armagh. You have thus many reasons to be proud of your parish.

Upon its completion, the church was dedicated, again by Cardinal D’Alton, on 16 June 1957 and during a speech to accompany the event, implicitly mentioning the then Cold War, he outlined the rationale for the naming of the church:

This church has been fittingly dedicated to Our Lady Queen of Peace and in one of the most historic periods of history, there is as yet no peace established among nations, but instead you have what might be termed an armed truce, made more terrible and destructive by the weapon that man's ingenuity has discovered in modern times.

The church is reported to have cost around £20,000 to build, and to be in the Romanesque style, with a 50-foot bell tower topped off with a bronze cross.

Our Lady Queen of Peace, Aughanduff
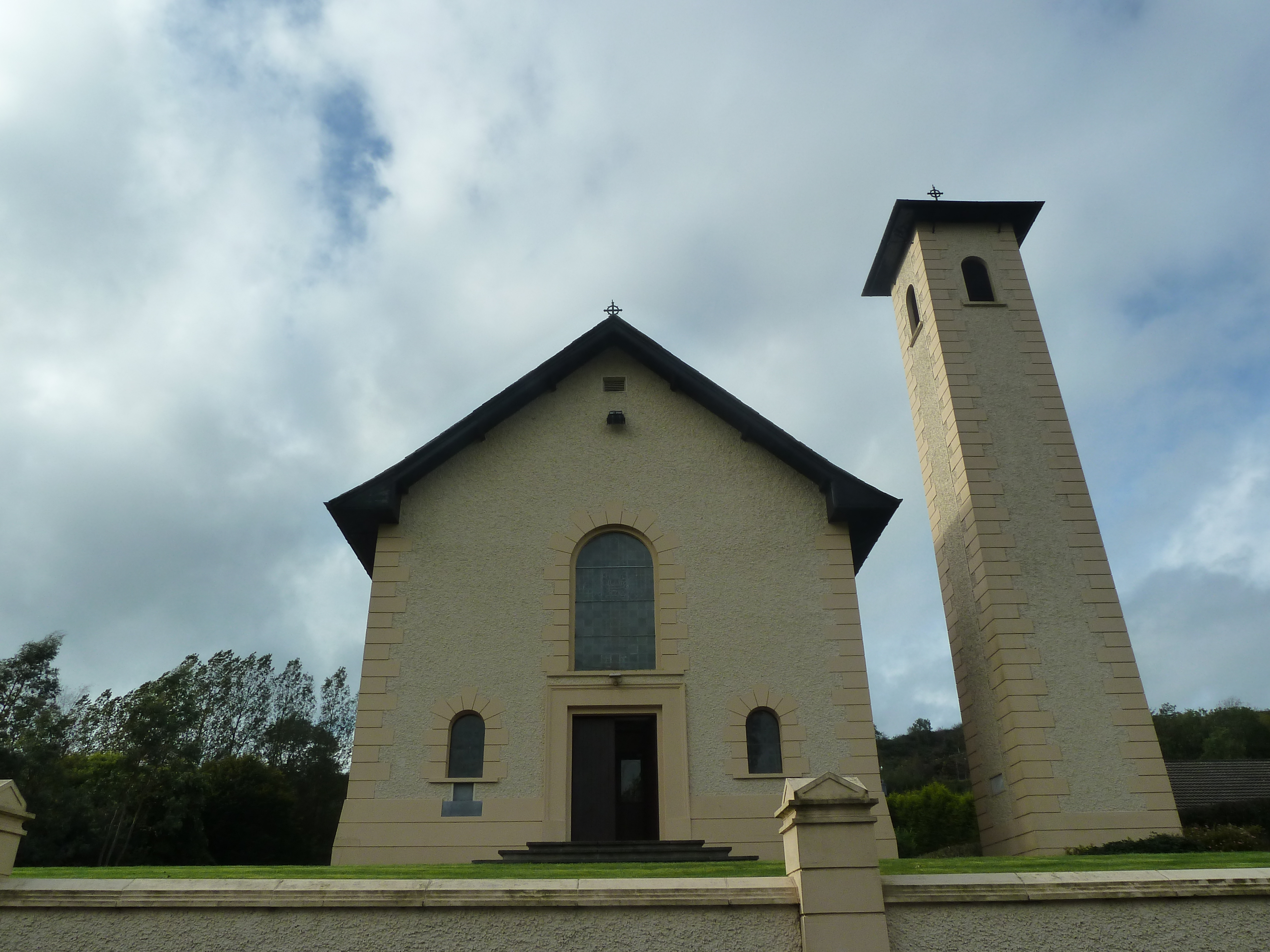
Our Lady, Queen of Peace (exterior)

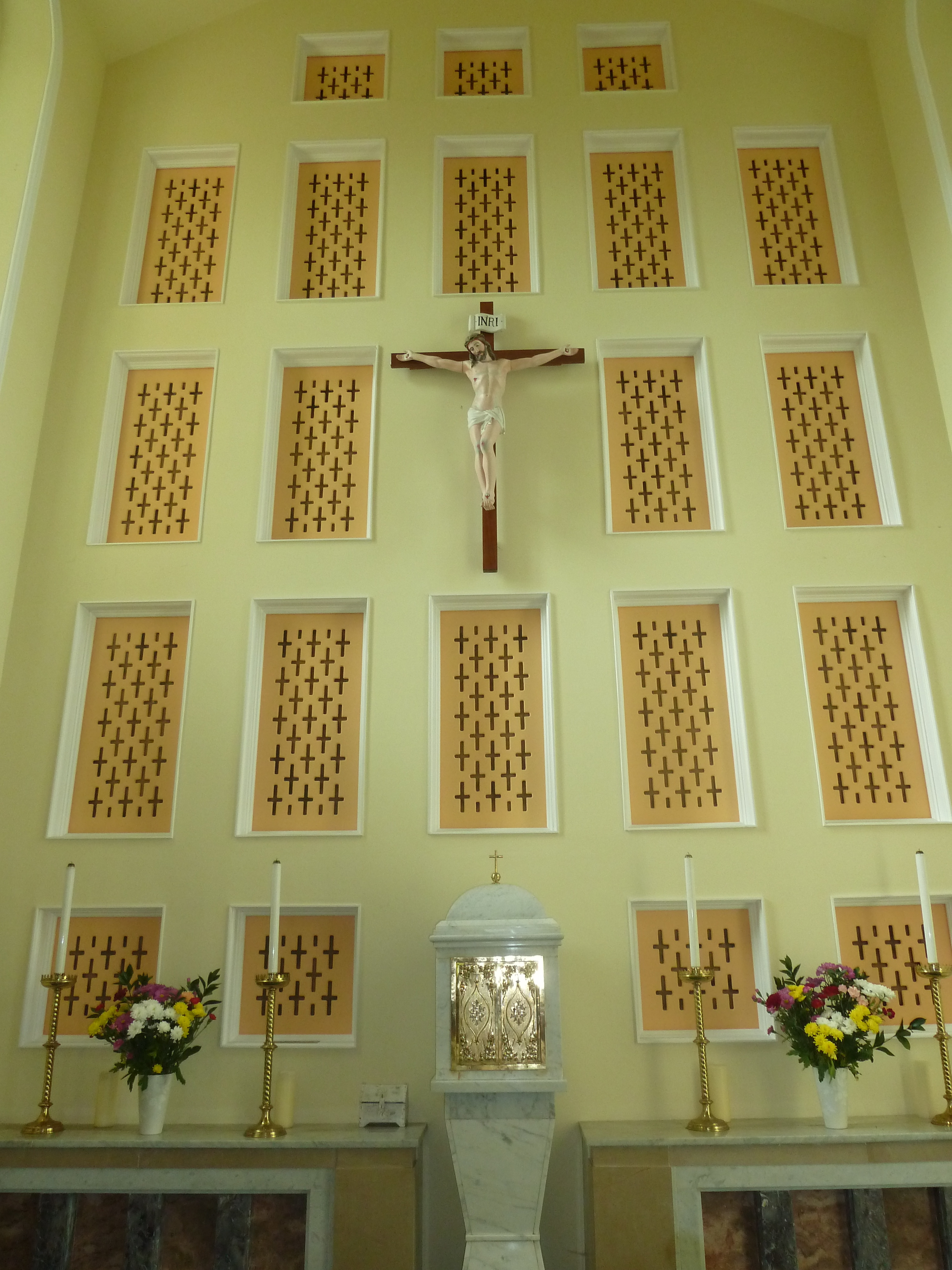
Church interior (facing front)

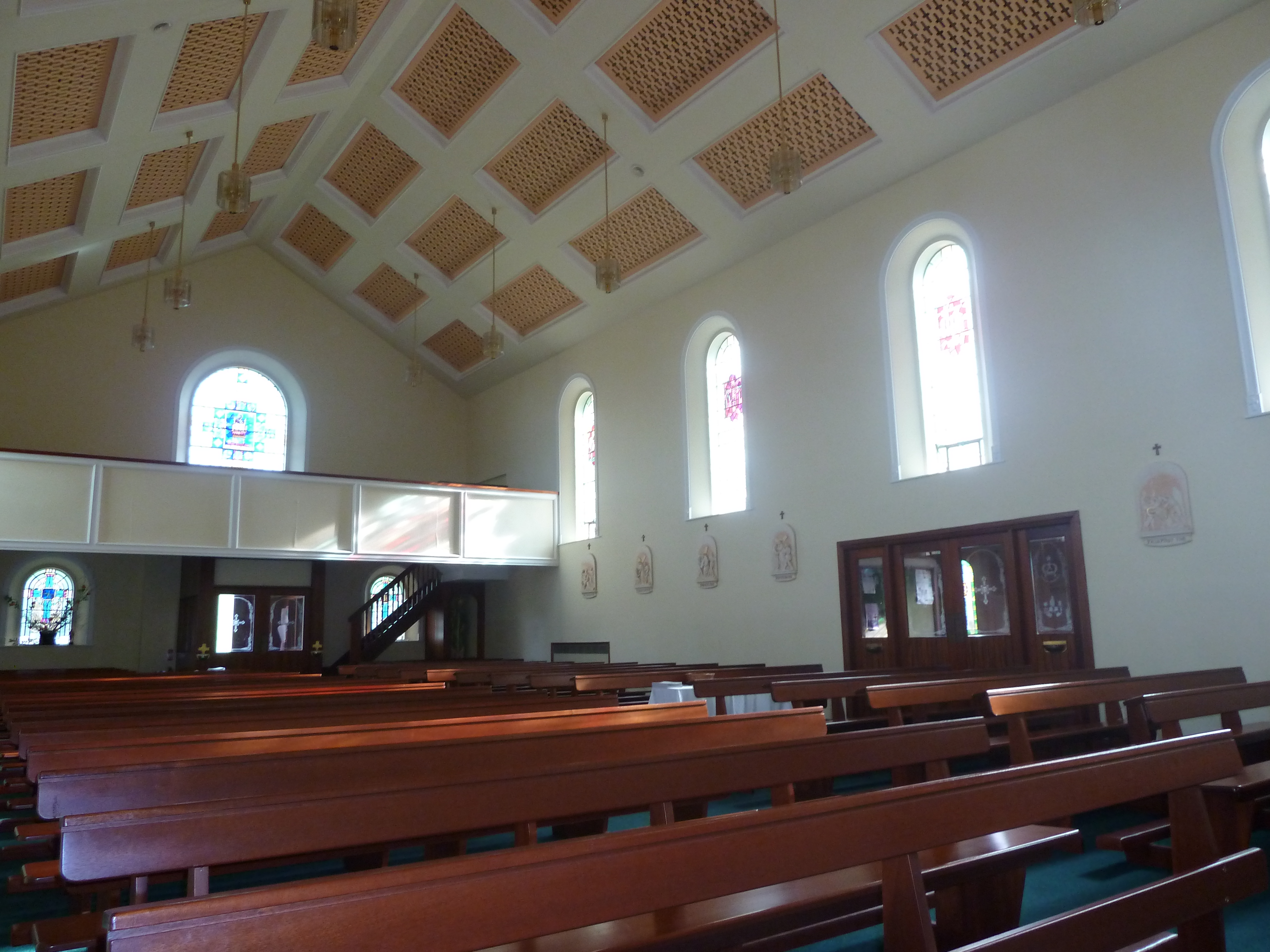
Church interior (facing rear)

==== The Troubles ====
The Troubles, which impacted on Northern Ireland and border areas of the Republic from 1969 onwards saw the area remain relatively quiet but with frequent British Army patrols, checkpoints, and Helicopter activity. The most significant event relating directly to the townland which was to occur during the troubles was probably an attack on a military helicopter en route from Crossmaglen to Bessbrook in June 1988, and which Harden records as follows:

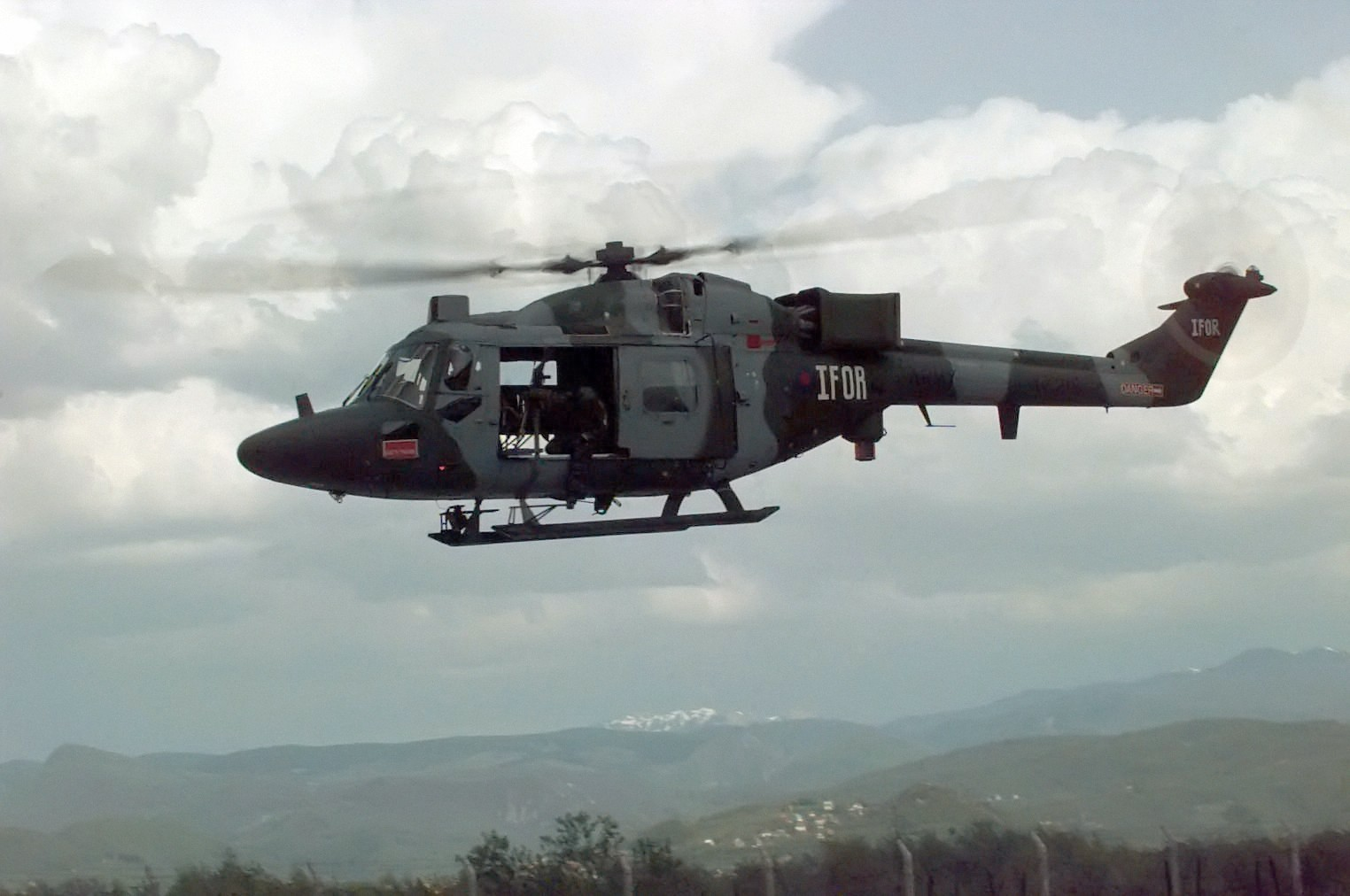
A Westland Lynx similar to that fired upon from Aughanduff (upper) mountain in 1988

The Libyan shipments further enhanced the IRA's anti-aircraft capability when 18 DShKs were landed between 1985 and 1987. The DShK, or Degtyarova Shapgma Krupnokalibernyi, designed by Degtyarova and Shapgma and manufactured in Russia, had been used against American forces during the Vietnam War. Taking several men to carry, the weapon has an effective range of more than a mile and can fire 575 rounds per minute. A DShK was used for the first time by the IRA in June 1988. This time it was a lynx flying from Crossmaglen to Bessbrook Mill which was the target. Lieutenant David Richardson, a Royal Navy pilot attached to the Army Air Corps, felt his Lynx get into a spin as it was hit 15 times around the fuselage and rotors, damaging control cables and stopping on engine. Several of the rounds were amour-piercing and the aircraft was forced to make an emergency landing near Cashel Lough Upper. It was later found that the Lynx had been engaged by two DShKs, three M60s and assorted rifles from Aughanduff mountain. An IRA statement said a dozen volunteers had taken part in the attack.

The impact of the Troubles lessened during the early stages of the Northern Ireland Peace Process, and especially following the demilitarisation of the South-Armagh region. The Troubles are widely seen to have ended with the 1998 Good Friday Agreement, but not definitively so until the deadly Omagh bombing of August that year, which saw 29 people killed. A minor connection between the area and that tragedy was that one of the two telephone warnings made by the Real IRA with respect to that attack was made from the BT telephone box at McGeough's crossroads in the south of the district, where the Aughanduff Road meets that running from Newry to Crossmaglen.

== Sources ==
=== Bibliography ===
- Harnden, T. (1999). Bandit Country. London: Hodder & Stoughton.
- Hunter, R. J. (2001). A. J. Hughes; W. Nolan (eds.). Armagh: History & Society. Dublin: Geography Publications. pp. County Armagh: a map of plantation, c. 1610.
- Madden, Kyla (2007). Forkhill Protestants and Forkhill Catholics 1787–1858. Mcgill Queens University Press. ISBN 9780773528550.
- McCavitt, J. (2001). "Rebels, planters and conspirators: Armagh 1594–1640". In A. J. Hughes; W. Nolan (eds.). Armagh: History & Society. Dublin: Geography Publications.
- Ó Fiaich, Tomás (1974). "The O'Neills of the Fews - Part II: overthrow and exile". Seanchas Ardmhacha: Journal of the Armagh Diocesan Historical Society. 7 (2): 263–315. doi:10.2307/29740845. JSTOR 29740845.
- Walsh, U.; Murphy, K., eds. (2003). Kick Any Stone: Townlands, People and Stories of Forkhill Parish. Armagh: Mullaghbawn Community Association.

== See also ==
- County Armagh
- Townland
- History of Northern Ireland
