= Demographics of Northern Ireland from the 2001 United Kingdom census =

This article discusses the Demographics of Northern Ireland as presented by the United Kingdom Census in 2001.

See List of United Kingdom nations by population for a breakdown of regional population statistics

- Population
  - total: 1,685,267
- Place of birth
  - Northern Ireland: 1,534,268 (91.0%)
  - England: 61,609 (3.7%)
  - Scotland: 16,772 (1.0%)
  - Wales: 3,008 (0.2%)
  - Republic of Ireland: 39,051 (2.3%)
  - Elsewhere in the EU: 10,355 (0.6%)
  - Elsewhere: 20,204 (1.2%)
- Ethnicity
  - White: 1,670,988 (99.15%)
  - Chinese: 4,145 (0.25%)
  - Mixed: 3,319 (0.20%)
  - Irish Traveller: 1,710 (0.10%)
  - Indian: 1,567 (0.09%)
  - Other Ethnic Group: 1,290 (0.08%)
  - Pakistani: 666 (0.04%)
  - Black African: 494 (0.03%)
  - Other Black: 387 (0.02%)
  - Black Caribbean: 255 (0.02%)
  - Bangladeshi: 252 (0.01%)
  - Other Asian: 194 (0.01%)
- Religion (Religion or Religion Brought Up In)
  - Protestant and Other Christian: 895,377 (53.1%)
  - Roman Catholic: 737,412 (43.8%)
  - None: 45,909 (2.7%)
  - Other Religions and Philosophies: 6,569 (0.4%)
