= Newry and Armagh =

Newry and Armagh can refer to:

- Newry and Armagh (Assembly constituency)
- Newry and Armagh (UK Parliament constituency)
